= Harbor Defenses of Manila and Subic Bays =

World War II fortifications

Coordinates: 14°23′N 120°34′E

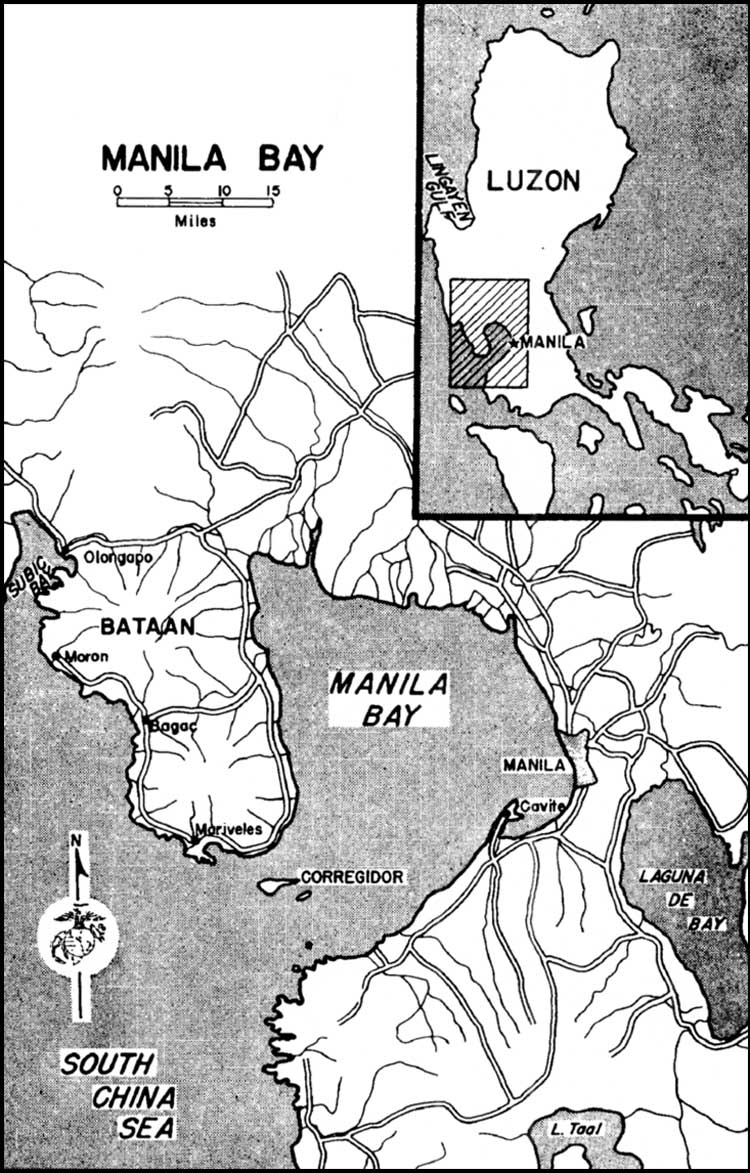
- The harbor of Manila and surrounding areas
- Active: 1905–1942
- Country: United States
- Branch: United States Army Coast Artillery Corps
- Type: Coast artillery
- Role: Harbor Defense Command
- Part of: Philippine Department (1922–1941); United States Army Forces in the Far East (November 1941– March 1942); United States Forces in the Philippines (March 1942 – May 1942)
- Garrison/HQ: Fort Mills, Corregidor
- Mascot: Oozlefinch
- Engagements: Philippines campaign (1941–1942)

Commanders
- Notable commanders: MG George F. Moore; Col. Paul D. Bunker

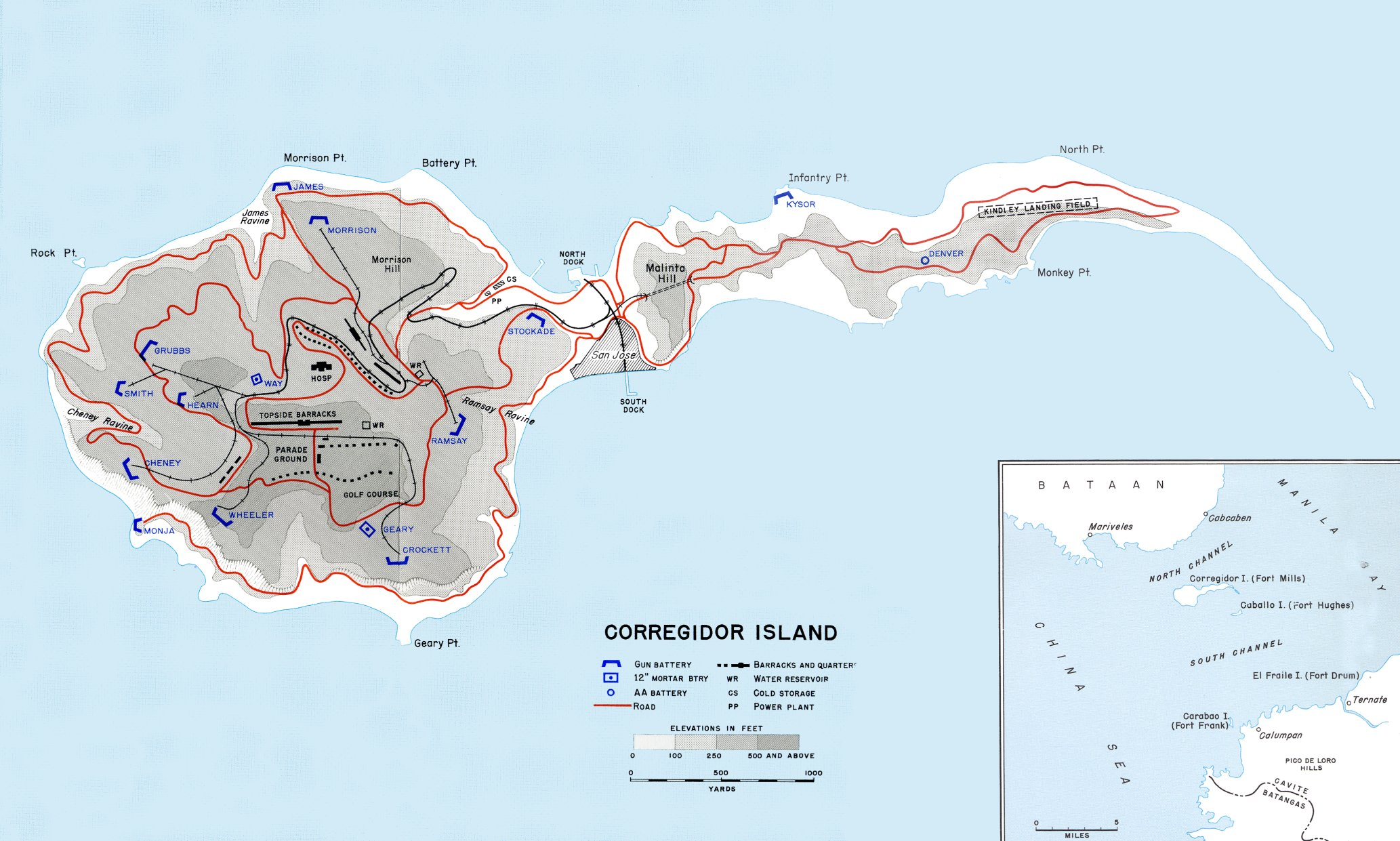
Corregidor/Fort Mills with other forts inset.

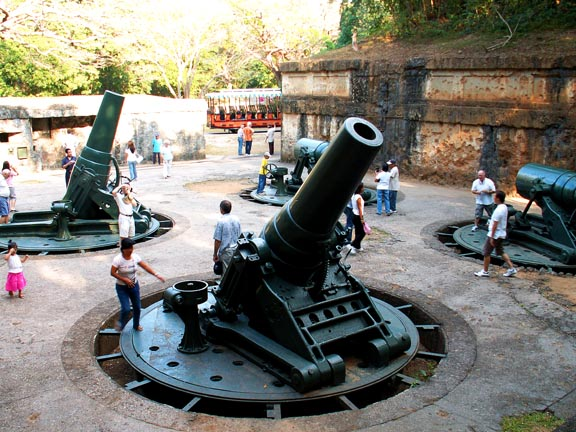
12-inch (305 mm) mortars of Battery Way, Fort Mills in 2007.

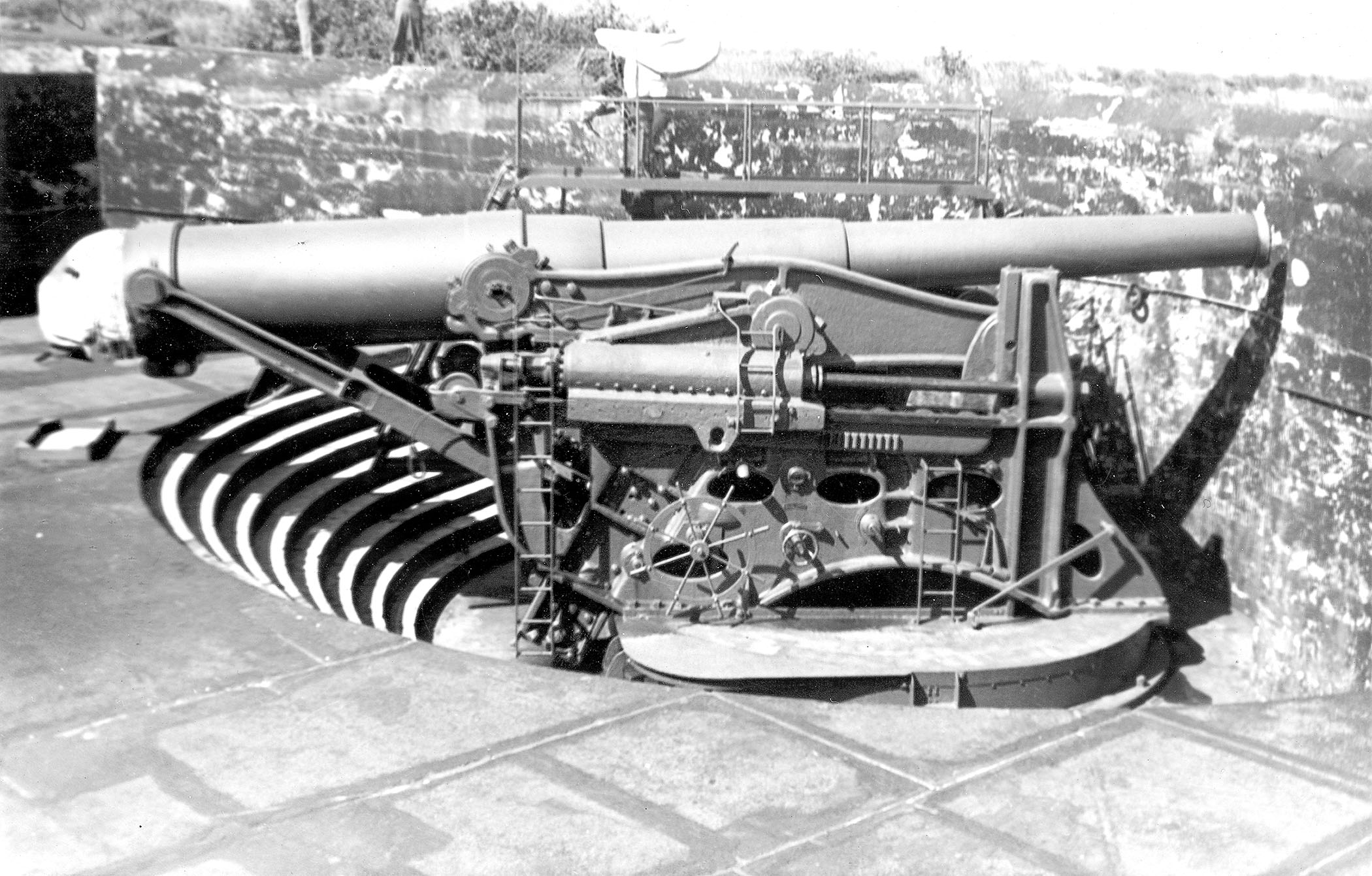
12-inch (305 mm) gun on a disappearing carriage, generally similar to other 10-inch through 14-inch disappearing batteries.

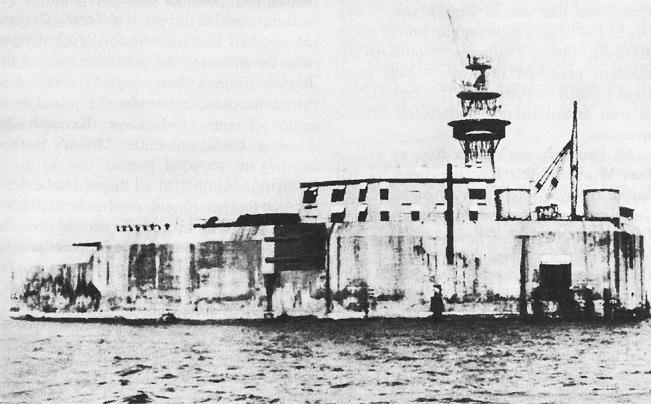
Fort Drum. Temporary wooden barracks on the fort's deck are visible near the fire control tower.

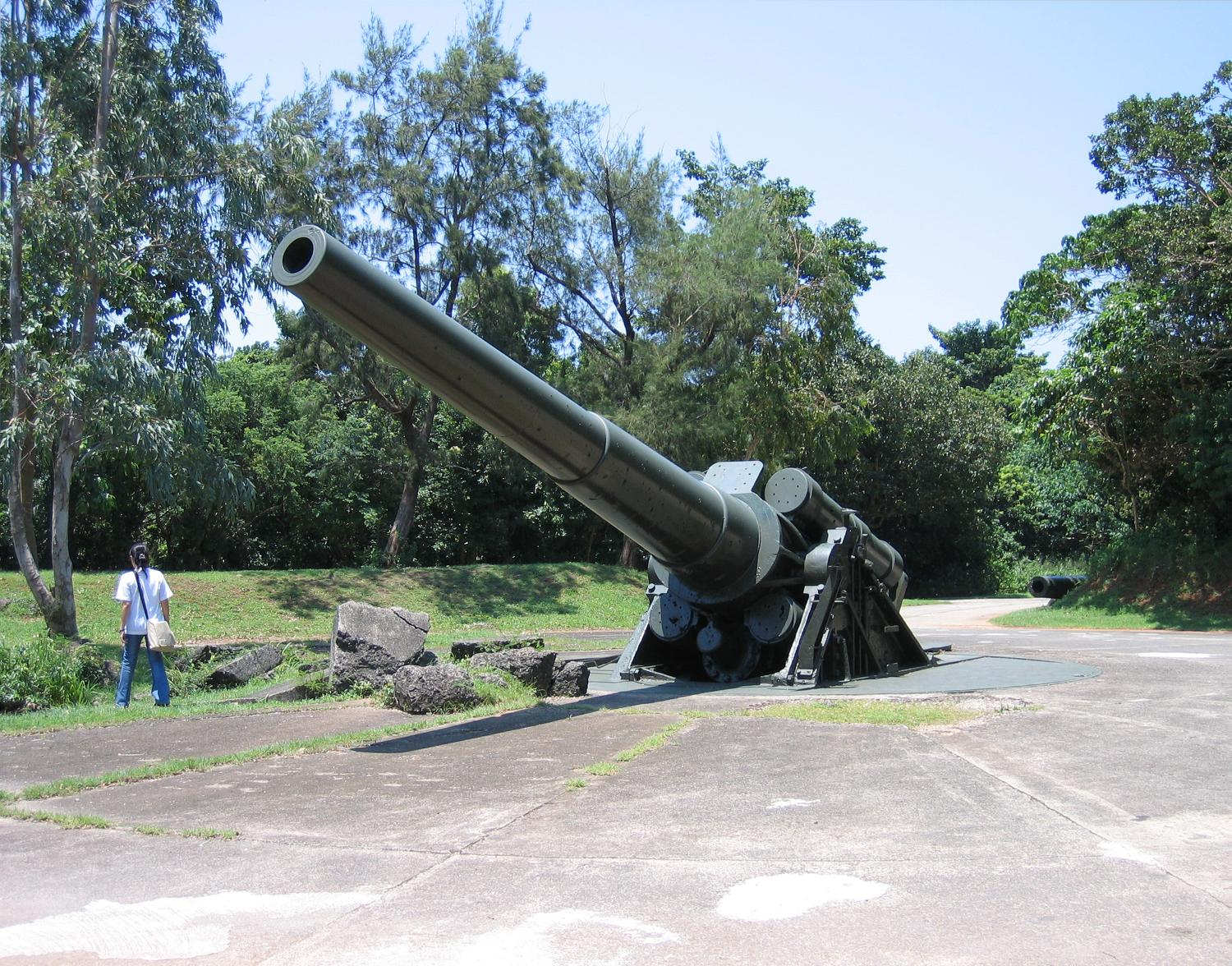
12-inch (305 mm) M1895 gun of Battery Hearn, Fort Mills circa 2010.

The Harbor Defenses of Manila and Subic Bays ("Coast Defenses of Manila and Subic Bays" until 1925) (a.k.a. CD/HD Manila Bay) were a United States Army Coast Artillery Corps harbor defense command, part of the Philippine Department of the United States Army from circa 1910 through early World War II. The command primarily consisted of four forts on islands at the entrance to Manila Bay and one fort on an island in Subic Bay.

== Background and construction ==
The United States acquired the Philippines as a territory as a result of the Spanish–American War in 1898. The Taft Board of 1905 recommended extensive, then-modern fortifications at the entrance to Manila Bay. The islands there had been declared military reservations on 11 April 1902. Accordingly, El Fraile, Carabao, Corregidor, Grande, and Caballo Islands in the Philippines were to be fortified and incorporated into the harbor defenses of Manila and Subic Bays, protecting the bases of the US Asiatic Fleet and the Philippines' capital and chief port of Manila. From circa 1905 to 1915 the following forts were built: Fort Mills (Corregidor), Fort Hughes (Caballo Island), Fort Drum (El Fraile Island), and Fort Frank (Carabao Island) at the entrance to Manila Bay, as well as Fort Wint (Grande Island) at the entrance to Subic Bay. The forts were designed for one purpose: to prevent enemy surface vessels from entering Manila Bay or Subic Bay. They were designed before airplanes became important in war, and (except for Fort Drum) were vulnerable to air and high-angle artillery attack, being protected only by camouflage. Except for the mortar batteries, the turrets of Fort Drum, and the two 12-inch (305 mm) guns of the 1920s Batteries Smith and Hearn, the forts' guns had restricted arcs of fire of about 170°, and could only bear on targets entering the bay from the west.

In an exercise in 1907 at Subic Bay, a US Marine battalion of the Advanced Base Force commanded by Major Eli K. Cole emplaced forty-four heavy guns for coast defense in a ten-week period, due to the Eight-eight fleet war scare with Japan. These were operated by the Marines until circa 1910, when Fort Wint on Grande Island was completed.

Corregidor was by far the largest fortified island in the Philippines, strategically located at the mouth of Manila Bay. Fort Mills was built there and was substantially complete by 1911. At that time the island had six 12-inch (305 mm) guns on disappearing carriages, twelve 12-inch (305 mm) mortars, two 10-inch (254 mm) disappearing guns, five 6-inch (152 mm) disappearing guns, and four 3-inch (76 mm) guns on pedestal mounts. Three additional batteries of two 3-inch (76 mm) guns each followed within a few years; Battery Keyes in 1913 and Batteries Cushing and Hanna in 1919. As the only fort on a sizable island, Corregidor had most of the barracks along with administrative and headquarters buildings. The island also had 13 miles of electric railway, an unusual feature in US forts.

Fort Drum on El Fraile Island, completed in 1914, was the second-most powerful fort in Manila Bay and the most unusual. The island was partway between Corregidor and the Cavite province shore south of that island. El Fraile was razed to the waterline and a "concrete battleship" structure built on it. Fort Drum was both the only sea fort and the only fort with turrets in the post-1885 US fort systems. Two turrets housing two 14-inch (356 mm) guns each were atop the fort. The 14-inch guns were the only M1909 14-inch guns deployed; they were specially designed for Fort Drum's turrets. Each side of the fort housed a pair of 6-inch (152 mm) guns in casemates. The turrets proved impregnable to both air attack and plunging fire from Japanese 240 mm (9.45 in) howitzers, remaining in action until the surrender on 6 May 1942.

Forts Hughes and Frank, both completed by 1914 (except Fort Hughes' mortars in 1919), were generally similar in that each had two one-gun batteries of 14-inch (356 mm) guns. Fort Hughes was just south of Corregidor, while Fort Frank was at the southern entrance to Manila Bay, close to the Cavite province shore. In addition to the 14-inch guns, Fort Hughes also had four 12-inch (305 mm) mortars, two 6-inch (152 mm) disappearing guns, and two 3-inch (76 mm) guns. Fort Frank also had eight 12-inch mortars and two 3-inch guns.

Fort Wint was completed in 1910, on Grande Island at the mouth of Subic Bay, at some distance from the other fort. It had the least armament; two 10-inch (254 mm) disappearing guns, two 6-inch (152 mm) disappearing guns, and four 3-inch (76 mm) guns.

During the American participation in World War I CD Manila Bay had an authorized strength of 21 companies. In 1919 the defenses' commander was Colonel Calvin Hearn. The 59th Coast Artillery Regiment was transferred to the Philippines in 1921, including some 155 mm (6.1 in) GPF guns. From 1922 parts of the defenses were garrisoned by units of the Philippine Scouts, which were US Regular Army units primarily composed of Filipino enlisted men and US officers. In 1922-23 fifteen companies of Philippine Scouts were authorized, initially numbered the 257th through 289th companies of Coast Artillery. In 1924, as part of a forcewide conversion of the Coast Artillery Corps to a regimental system, the 59th CA was reorganized as a tractor drawn regiment and the 91st and 92nd Coast Artillery Regiments (Philippine Scouts) were created from the existing companies. In 1935 the 59th CA was further reorganized as a harbor defense regiment.

The last new armament in HD Manila Bay until 1940 was significant but small in quantity: Batteries Smith and Hearn at Fort Mills, completed in 1921. These had one 12-inch (305 mm) M1895 gun each on an M1917 long-range carriage, with an elevation of 35° and 360° of traverse, with range increased from 18,400 yd (16,800 m) on a disappearing carriage to 29,300 yd (26,800 m). The disadvantage was that the guns were completely unprotected. This type of battery was also built at eight other harbor defense commands in CONUS, Hawaii, and Panama. In 1923 the Washington Naval Treaty prohibited additional fortifications in the Pacific, thus the Philippine forts received no further weapons until after 1936, when Japan withdrew from the treaty, rendering it void. Ironically, had these batteries been modernized, they would have been casemated, restricting them to a 180° field of fire, and would have been less useful against the Japanese on Bataan. One result of the Washington Naval Treaty was the diversion of twelve 240 mm howitzers on a ship bound for the Philippines to Hawaii, where they were placed on fixed mountings on Oahu. The total lack of mobile high-angle artillery was a major impediment to the defense of the Philippines.

Spare gun barrels were provided near some batteries on Corregidor, including Smith and Hearn, due to the inability to re-line used barrels except at specialized facilities in the continental United States (CONUS).

=== Minefields ===
Manila Bay and Subic Bay had Army-operated minefields available from circa 1915 (not usually deployed in peacetime) as well as naval mines laid in 1941. These minefields were designed to stop all vessels except submarines and shallow-draft surface craft. In Manila Bay, two controlled minefields were placed by USAMP Colonel George F. E. Harrison, one extending west from Corregidor to La Monja Island, and the other extending north from Corregidor to the Bataan Peninsula east of Mariveles Bay. Both of these were operated from Corregidor. Also, in mid-1941 US Navy minefields of contact mines were laid between Mariveles Bay and La Monja Island, and between Corregidor and Carabao Islands, to close off the bay approaches not covered by Army mines. The Subic Bay minefield was laid in July 1941 and operated from Fort Wint, with the controlled Army mines in the ship channel, and naval mines to the sides of the channel.

On the night of 16–17 December 1941 the passenger ship SS Corregidor (formerly HMS Engadine) hit a mine and sank near Corregidor Island. The ship departed Manila that night without obtaining permission from the US Navy's Inshore Patrol, which meant the minefield operators were not alerted that a friendly ship was departing the harbor. The minefield's usual state in wartime was active, which meant they would detonate on contact. This probably applied to the mines in the designated ship channel as well. When the ship was spotted, some accounts state that Colonel Paul Bunker, commander of the Seaward Defenses, ordered that the minefield remain active. Due to wartime conditions, no official investigation was ever conducted, leaving many questions open. The location at which the ship sank has not been determined, for example. Accounts state that US Army officers informally told Filipino reporters that the mines were placed in safe mode immediately after the sinking. The ship was crowded with 1,200 to 1,500 persons, mostly Filipino civilians evacuating to Mindanao. 150 Philippine Army personnel and seven Americans were on board, along with several 2.95-inch mountain guns badly needed by the forces in the southern Philippines. Three PT boats (PT-32, PT-34 and PT-35) picked up 282 survivors, of which seven later died.

=== The Malinta Tunnel ===
The main part of the Malinta Tunnel complex was built on Corregidor from 1932 to 1934, with construction continuing until the Philippines was invaded by Japan in December 1941. Most US forts of this era had only small underground facilities, and this tunnel complex was the largest in the US coastal defense system. Due to the Washington Naval Treaty's prohibition on new fortifications, most of the complex was built without appropriated funds, using Filipino convict labor for unskilled tasks, and explosives slated for disposal. During the siege, the Malinta Tunnel proved important to the survival of the Philippine government, the military high command, the medical staff, and numerous civilians.

== World War II ==
On 26 July 1941 Lieutenant General Douglas MacArthur was recalled to active duty and made the commander of U.S. Army Forces in the Far East (USAFFE), which included the Philippine Scouts and the Philippine Commonwealth Army. MacArthur had been an official US advisor to the Philippine forces as a Philippine Field Marshal from 1935 to 1937, and had continued this function as a civilian since his retirement from the U.S. Army at the end of that period. In July 1941 the harbor defenses were commanded by Major General George F. Moore, whose Philippine Coast Artillery Command was headquartered at Fort Mills, on Corregidor. At this time there were 4,967 troops assigned to the Harbor Defenses.

The major units under the harbor defense command in World War II included:

- 59th Coast Artillery (Harbor Defense) (U.S. Regular Army)
- 91st Coast Artillery (HD) (Philippine Scouts)
- 92nd Coast Artillery (Tractor Drawn) (Philippine Scouts)
- 60th Coast Artillery AA (U.S. Regular Army)
- 1st Coast Artillery (Philippine Army)
- 2nd Coast Artillery (Philippine Army)

Other antiaircraft units in the Philippines included:

- 200th Coast Artillery AA (New Mexico National Guard) (arrived September 1941)
- 515th Coast Artillery AA (New Mexico National Guard, Philippine Army) (organized December 1941 from the 200th CA AA and Philippine Army)

=== Antiaircraft units ===
Chief of Coast Artillery Major General Joseph A. Green had recommended reassigning elements of the Harbor Defenses to anti-aircraft duty, but this proposal was rejected. However, a few harbor defense batteries manned AA batteries in the campaign. Most of the AA batteries at the harbor forts were manned by the 60th Coast Artillery (AA). The War Department had been intending to send three additional AA regiments and two brigade headquarters, however only one was sent before the Japanese invasion in December 1941. This was the 200th Coast Artillery (AA), which arrived in September 1941 and initially defended Fort Stotsenburg and Clark Field. The 515th Coast Artillery (AA) was formed in December 1941 using stored AA weapons and troops detached from the 200th, soon augmented by Philippine Army personnel. The regiment initially defended Manila. However, after Manila was declared an open city on 26 December, the 200th and 515th screened the withdrawal to Bataan and fought in the Battle of Bataan. When US forces in Bataan surrendered on 9 April 1942, these units were forced to join the Bataan Death March. With the exception of those areas covered by the 60th, 200th, and 515th CA AA regiments, the Philippine islands were virtually defenseless against air attack.

=== The siege begins ===
The Japanese invaded northern Luzon a few days after the attack on Pearl Harbor on 7 December 1941 that brought the US into the war. They advanced rapidly, with other landings elsewhere, notably at Legazpi in southeast Luzon on 12 December, Davao on Mindanao on 20 December, and Lingayen Gulf on 22 December. On 26 December 1941 Manila was declared an open city, with the Philippine government and MacArthur's headquarters evacuated to the Malinta Tunnel. Amid the evacuations, a re-inauguration ceremony for Philippine President Manuel Quezon's second term was held just outside the tunnel on 30 December. The Japanese entered Manila on 2 January 1942. Five days later the US and Philippine forces completed a fighting withdrawal to the Bataan peninsula, northwest of Corregidor, and prepared to defend it. All forces were withdrawn from Fort Wint and the Subic Bay area as part of this, reportedly due to a mistake by the commander of the Northern Luzon Force. A part of this withdrawal was the shipment of six 155 mm (6.1 in) GPF guns from the quartermaster depot at Los Baños (southeast of Manila) to Bataan; the field artillery units had few guns and these were a welcome addition. In the northern Philippines, this left only Bataan, Corregidor, and Forts Hughes, Frank, and Drum in Allied hands. This situation had been anticipated in the prewar War Plan Orange-3, under which the forces in the Philippines were expected to hold out at the mouth of Manila Bay for six months. By that time it was anticipated that a relief expedition from the US might arrive. General MacArthur had hoped to defend the Philippines more aggressively under the Rainbow Plan, and was able to get some reinforcements in the months prior to the U.S. entering the war, but this fell apart with the rapid Japanese advance in December 1941. With almost all of the US Pacific Fleet's battleships sunk or damaged at Pearl Harbor, and the Japanese advancing in several parts of Southeast Asia at a much greater rate than expected, no relief was organized. Although extensive guerrilla operations were conducted by Filipinos with US support, US forces did not return to the Philippines in strength until the invasion of Leyte Gulf in October 1944.

On 3 February 1942 USS Trout (SS-202) arrived at Corregidor with 3,500 rounds of 3-inch anti-aircraft ammunition. Along with mail and important documents, Trout was loaded with 20 tons of gold and silver previously removed from banks in the Philippines before departing.

One aspect of MacArthur's Rainbow Plan was the Inland Seas Project, intended to defend a shipping route to keep his forces supplied. Part of this was a buildup of Philippine Commonwealth forces, and a projected deployment of coast artillery weapons manned by them in the central Philippines. In 1940-41 eight 8-inch (203 mm) railway guns and 24 155 mm (6.1 in) GPF guns were delivered to the Philippines, without crews as they were to be locally manned. The 8-inch guns were sent north in December 1941 to engage the invading Japanese forces, but six of them were destroyed by air attack. One gun was eventually placed on a fixed mount as Battery RJ-43 on Corregidor in March 1942; the other may have been at Bagac, Bataan. Reportedly the Corregidor gun fired only five proof rounds, then went unused for lack of a crew until knocked off its mount by bombing or shelling. The history of the Bataan gun is unknown. Most or all of the 24 155 mm GPF guns were eventually deployed at Corregidor and/or Bataan.

=== Fall of Bataan ===
Although the US and Filipino forces achieved success in defending Bataan through the end of February, they had taken 50 percent casualties and were worn out and poorly supplied. Also, the British fortress of Singapore had surrendered on 15 February, and the Japanese had taken several major islands of the Dutch East Indies, essentially preventing any reinforcement of the Philippines. Philippine President Manuel Quezon, with his family and senior officials, was evacuated to the southern Philippines by the submarine USS Swordfish (SS-193) on 20 February. MacArthur was ordered by President Franklin D. Roosevelt to relocate to Australia to prevent his capture and to direct further operations. He departed Corregidor on 12 March 1942, initially by PT boat to Mindanao, completing his journey by air. On 20 March he made a speech with the famous phrase "I shall return". He left Lieutenant General Jonathan M. Wainwright IV in a subordinate command in the Philippines, telling the key officers there that he (MacArthur) would control the military forces in the Philippines from Australia. However, he neglected to inform Washington of this arrangement, and Washington intended Wainwright to be in charge. It was not until 20 March that the extent of Wainwright's authority and degree of independence from MacArthur was clarified by a message from General George C. Marshall, the Army chief of staff.

The Japanese in Bataan received substantial reinforcements and replacements in March, including 240 mm howitzers and aircraft, and prepared for an offensive scheduled for 3 April. It started with a five-hour air and artillery bombardment that destroyed many of the Allied defensive positions and stunned the defenders; a three-day assault threw them back along much of the line. On 6 April the US and Filipino forces attempted a counterattack, which ran into a fresh Japanese attack that eventually threw the Allies further back. Over the next two days many Allied units disintegrated, and on 9 April the Allied forces in Bataan surrendered. About 2,000 stragglers made it to Corregidor, while about 78,000 became prisoners of the Japanese and were transferred to camps in northern Luzon on the Bataan Death March.

=== Fall of Corregidor ===
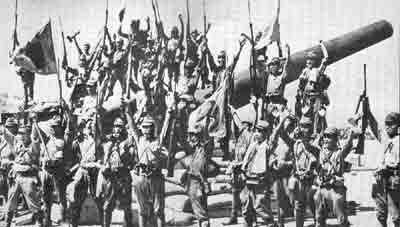
Japanese troops celebrate the capture of Corregidor and the Philippines at Battery Hearn, May 1942

Corregidor had been bombed intermittently since 29 December 1941. Supplies on the island were short, with food and water rationed and the defenders correspondingly weakened but were still fed better than their Bataan counterparts. Japanese artillery bombardment of Corregidor began immediately after the fall of Bataan on 9 April. It became intense over the next few weeks as more guns were brought up, and one day's shelling was said to equal all the bombing raids combined in damage inflicted. However, after an initial response from a 155 mm GPF battery, Lt. Gen. Wainwright prohibited counter-battery fire for three days, fearing there were wounded POWs on Bataan who might be killed. Japanese aircraft flew 614 missions, dropping 1,701 bombs totaling some 365 tons of explosive. Joining the aerial bombardment were nine 240 mm (9.45 in) howitzers, thirty-four 149 mm (5.9 in) howitzers, and 32 other artillery pieces, which pounded Corregidor day and night. It was estimated that on 4 May alone, more than 16,000 shells hit Corregidor. Forts Frank and Drum had been bombarded from the Pico de Loro hills on the Cavite province shore since 6 February by a gradually increasing Japanese artillery force.

The bombardment by high-angle artillery and aircraft gradually destroyed the utility of almost all of Corregidor's big guns, which had no overhead protection except for magazines and generators. The 12-inch (305 mm) mortars of Battery Geary and Battery Way fared better until near the end; their battery arrangement did not require electric power for ammunition hoists. However, Battery Way at least had been out of service for years; only three mortars were restored to service and these not until 28 April, and by 5 May two of these were out of action. There was also a shortage of high explosive shells, and adapting the armor piercing shells for instantaneous detonation was time-consuming at only 25 shells per day. On 2 May a 240 mm shell penetrated one of Battery Geary's magazines; the resulting explosion put the entire battery out of action, blowing one mortar 150 yards (140 m) from the battery and embedding another mortar entirely inside another magazine. Among the harbor forts, only Fort Drum's turrets proved impregnable to attack; they remained in action until the surrender despite damage to other parts of the fort.

On the night of 4 May a submarine returning to Australia from patrol evacuated 25 persons. Among the passengers were Colonel Constant Irwin, who carried a complete roster of all Army, Navy, and Marine personnel still alive; Col. Royal G. Jenks, a finance officer, with financial accounts; Col. Milton A. Hill, the inspector general, 3 other Army and 6 Navy officers, and about 13 nurses. Included in the cargo sent from Corregidor were several bags of mail, the last to go out of the Philippines, and "many USAFFE and USFIP records and orders".

The bombardment increased in intensity through 5 May, and the Japanese landed that night. Their initial landing was near the east end of the island, north of Kindley Field, the airstrip. This was somewhat east of their objective, which was between Infantry Point and Cavalry Point, due to a miscalculation of the current. The 4th Marine Regiment coordinated the ground forces, which included many soldiers and sailors from support units untrained in ground combat, many of them escapees from Bataan. Several coast artillery and antiaircraft batteries were abandoned to free their crews as ground forces. Of 229 officers and 3,770 enlisted men attached to the regiment, only around 1,500 were US Marines. The Japanese landed on the night of 5 May about 2300, with 75 mm and 37 mm guns deployed for beach defense reportedly causing them heavy casualties. At least three of the 155 mm guns were also still in action. However, by 0130 the Japanese captured Battery Denver, turning back three Allied counterattacks by 0400. At dawn, around 0440, more invasion barges were spotted and fire support from Fort Drum's 14-inch (356 mm) guns was requested. Although smoke obscured the barges, Fort Drum was directed to fire "anywhere between you and Cabcaben" (in Bataan), and over 100 rounds were fired on the invasion route. By 1000 the Japanese were firmly lodged on the island. With 600-800 Allied troops killed and over 1,000 wounded, no reserves were left. No one was available to evacuate the wounded, and most of those who attempted to walk to the Malinta Tunnel were either further wounded or killed. General Wainwright felt certain that further Japanese troops would land in the night and seize the Malinta Tunnel, where they might massacre the wounded and noncombatants. He decided to sacrifice one day of freedom to save several thousand lives. After giving orders to his forces to destroy their weapons to prevent their use by the enemy, he surrendered.

The units in the south were in much better positions for both supplies and continued resistance than those at Bataan or Corregidor were, and their commanders believed Wainwright's surrender orders were made under duress. It was not until 9 June that the Japanese accepted that all of the islands had surrendered. Some units never did surrender, and became nuclei for guerrilla operations that continued until the Japanese were mostly killed or captured in early 1945, following MacArthur's return to the Philippines in force in October 1944.

The conquest of the Philippines by Japan is often considered the worst military defeat in United States history. About 23,000 American military personnel were killed or captured, while Filipino soldiers killed or captured totaled around 100,000.

The Philippines, Burma, and the Dutch East Indies were the last major territories the Japanese invaded in World War II. As Corregidor surrendered, the Battle of the Coral Sea was in progress, turning back a Japanese attempt to seize Port Moresby, New Guinea by sea. By the final surrender on 9 June, the Battle of Midway was over, blunting Japan's naval strength with the loss of four large aircraft carriers and hundreds of skilled pilots. Both of these victories were costly to the US Navy as well, with two aircraft carriers lost, but the United States could replace their ships and train more pilots, and Japan, for the most part, could not do so adequately.

=== Recapturing the forts ===
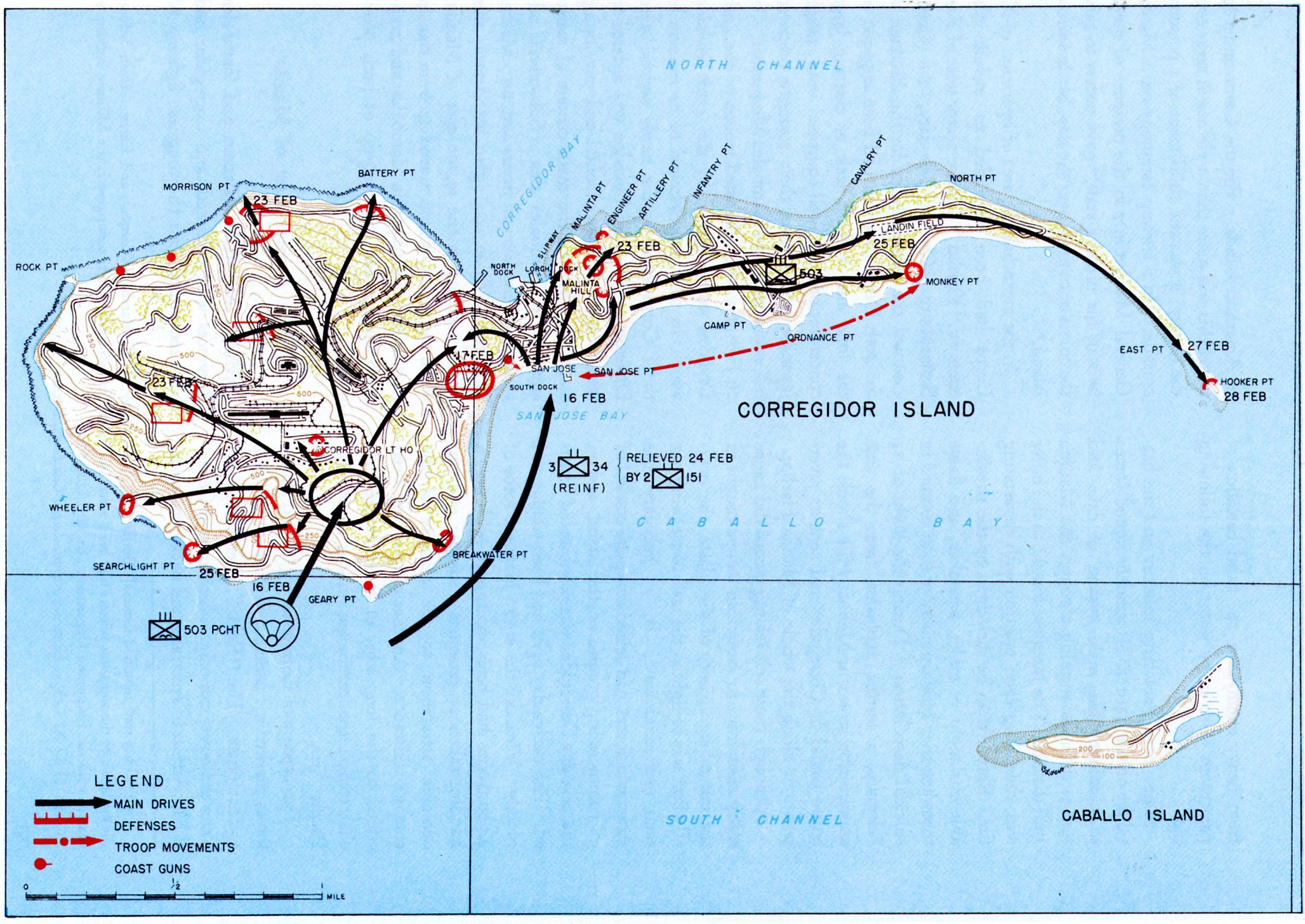
Map of the recapture of Corregidor, February 1945

US forces returned to the Philippines in a major invasion at Leyte beginning on 20 October 1944. The Imperial Japanese Navy attacked the invasion fleet on 23–26 October in the Battle of Leyte Gulf, the largest naval battle of the war, but were repulsed with heavy losses. In December 1944 an empty Fort Wint was reclaimed "without firing a shot". By early February 1945 much of the Manila area and part of Bataan had been secured. Corregidor was the biggest obstacle to reopening Manila Bay to shipping. A risky operation to recapture the island via near-simultaneous airborne and amphibious assault was devised. The invasion was set for 16 February and was preceded by air and naval bombardment. The airborne assault was to take place on Topside, the high ground in the west of the island. Only two small drop zones, the parade ground and the former golf course, were available. The overall plan was for the first airborne assault at 0830, the amphibious landing at 1030, and a second airborne lift at 1215. The airborne force was the 503rd Parachute Regimental Combat Team of Lieutenant Colonel George M. Jones, with a parachute field artillery battalion included. The amphibious assault was by the reinforced 3rd Battalion, 34th Infantry Regiment of the 24th Infantry Division.

The airborne assault began on schedule at 0833 on 16 February 1945. It achieved surprise and Japanese resistance was light. However, a higher drop altitude and stronger winds than planned, combined with the small drop zones, resulted in a 25 percent injury rate. Many troops landed outside the drop zones in wooded or rocky areas, or on ruined buildings and gun batteries. One group of paratroopers landed on an observation post that included the Japanese commander, and killed him. The amphibious assault at 1030 on the south shore of Bottomside at San Jose was also successful, despite encountering land mines. The surface of Malinta Hill was captured in half an hour, although numerous Japanese remained in the Malinta Tunnel below it. The second paratroop lift dropped at 1240, with a much lower injury rate than the first lift. The combined forces on Corregidor became known as "Rock Force".

As well as the force in the Malinta Tunnel, the Japanese were dug in on various parts of the island, occupying numerous tunnels and small bunkers. Rock Force cleared the bunkers in the typical fashion of the war in the Pacific: air-delivered napalm bombs where needed, followed by assaults with flamethrowers and white phosphorus grenades among other weapons. The Japanese would sometimes reoccupy these positions at night. In some cases demolition charges were used to entomb the Japanese in their bunkers and tunnels. The Japanese occasionally made banzai charges at this point in the war, which mainly succeeded in increasing their own casualties. There were attempts made to persuade the Japanese to surrender, but few did so. On at least three occasions the Japanese were able to detonate ammunition caches near American troops, usually followed by an attack, though these tactics killed more Japanese than Americans. The most spectacular of these was the detonation of a large amount of explosives in the Malinta Tunnel on the night of 21 February. Apparently the intention was to shock the Americans on and near Malinta Hill and allow the force in the tunnel to escape eastward to the island's tail. However, it appeared that the explosion was larger than intended, though perhaps several hundred Japanese out of an estimated 2,000 in the tunnel were able to join their main force on the tail. Two nights later more explosions shook Malinta Hill, probably the suicide of its remaining defenders. By this time the entire western part of the island was cleared and preparations made to clear the tail area. On 24 February the 3rd Battalion, 34th Infantry was relieved by the 2nd Battalion, 151st Infantry of the 38th Infantry Division. At 1100 on 26 February the Japanese apparently decided to finish themselves and take some Americans with them, setting off an ammunition-filled bunker at Monkey Point. Perhaps 200 Japanese were killed outright, along with 50 Americans killed and 150 wounded. Within a few hours the only Japanese left alive were in caves along the island's waterline, who were mopped up in a few days. Corregidor was formally reclaimed with a flag-raising on 2 March, attended by General MacArthur.

The remaining forts were reclaimed from late March through mid-April. The first was Fort Hughes, on Caballo Island southeast of Corregidor. The reinforced 2nd Battalion, 151st Infantry, veterans of the final days of the Corregidor assault, reclaimed Fort Hughes, and later Company F and an engineer detachment of the 113th (both of the 38th Infantry Division) retook Fort Drum. The attack on Fort Hughes began on 27 March 1945. The landing force amphibiously assaulted the island, following a brief but intense air and naval bombardment. The Japanese had prepared positions around the batteries and were able to shelter in the tunnels. Initial assaults were unsuccessful; the terrain was such that tanks could not bring their guns to bear on the Japanese positions. On 31 March an attempt was made to burn out the defenders by pouring diesel fuel down the only vent shaft accessible to the Americans. However, this did not work, as the diesel fuel could not be delivered up the sides of the battery fast enough. The commander of the 113th Engineer Combat Battalion devised a solution using two diesel-filled ponton cubes from the naval forces and a pump and flex hose from the air forces. On 5 April over 2,500 US gallons (9,500 L) of diesel fuel were pumped down the vent shaft and ignited using white phosphorus mortar rounds. This was repeated twice more on 6 and 7 April, followed by two demolition charges. The next few days were occupied with probing infantry attacks and attempts to persuade the surviving Japanese to surrender. On 13 April the last defender was killed and the fort was reclaimed.

Fort Drum was reclaimed in a similar manner on 13 April 1945, using a Landing Ship Medium (LSM) modified with a bridge to allow troops to run from the ship onto the fort's top deck. Company F of the 151st Infantry and a detachment of the 113th Engineer Combat Battalion took part. Over 3,000 US gallons (11,000 L) of fuel were pumped into the fort via a Landing Craft Mechanized (LCM), along with demolition charges totaling 600 pounds of TNT. The initial explosion was weak, but ten minutes later burning fuel apparently ignited an ammunition magazine, and the fort blew up. Secondary explosions and heat from the fires prevented entry into the fort until 18 April. 69 dead Japanese were counted.

Fort Frank on Carabao Island was assaulted on 16 April by the 1st Battalion of the 151st Infantry and Co. C of the 113th Engineer Combat Battalion. However, the Japanese had escaped to the mainland.

== See also ==
- Military history of the Philippines
- Military history of the United States
- Seacoast defense in the United States
- United States Army Coast Artillery Corps
- Naval Base Manila
