= 14-inch gun M1907 =

14-inch Gun M1907
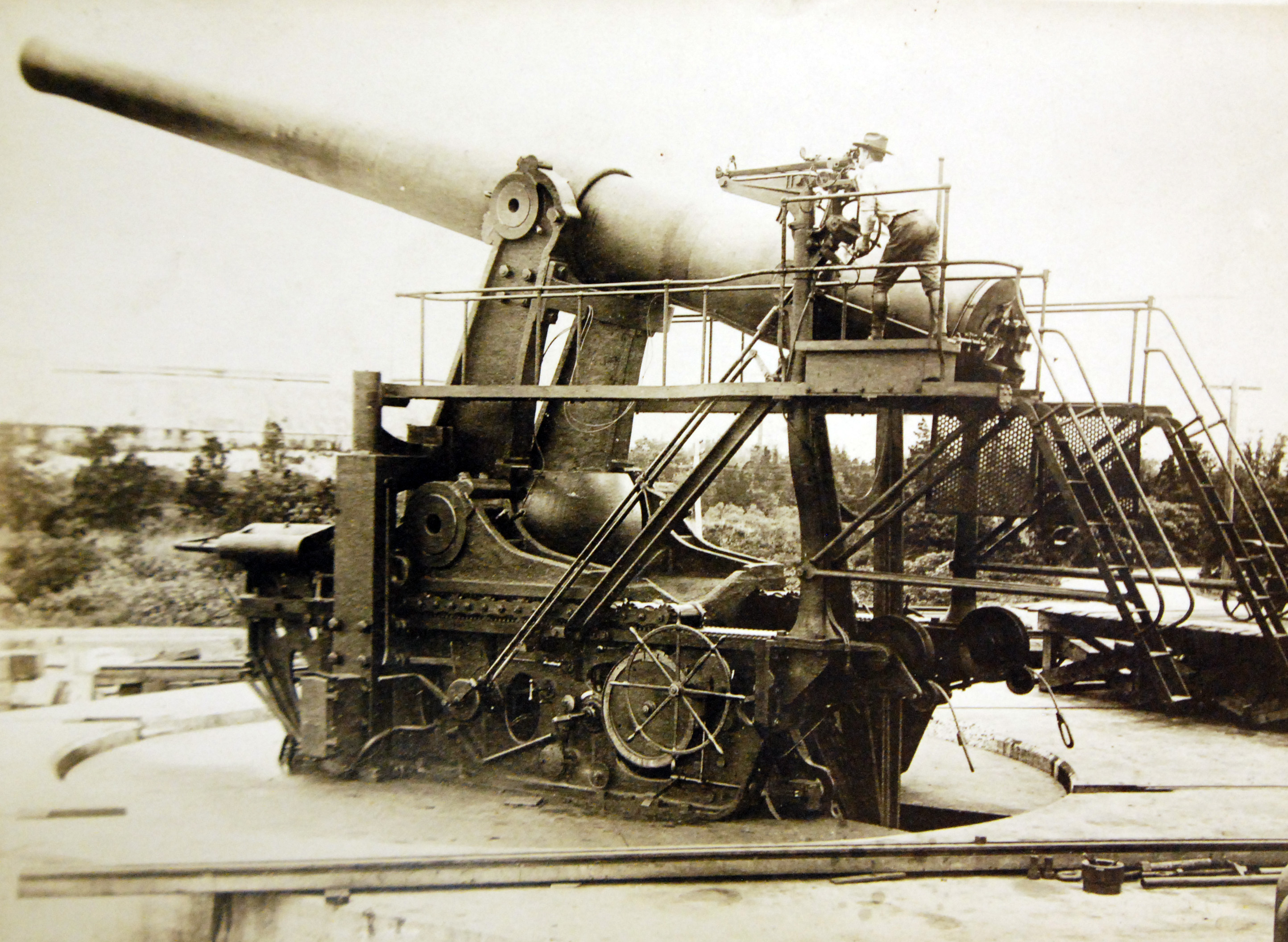
- 14-inch gun on disappearing carriage, Sandy Hook Proving Ground, New Jersey
- Type: Coastal artillery
- Place of origin: United States

Service history
- In service: 1908–1945
- Used by: United States Army
- Wars: World War I, World War II

Production history
- Designer: Watervliet Arsenal
- Designed: 1907–1910
- Manufacturer: Watervliet Arsenal
- Variants: M1907, M1907MI M1909 M1910, M1910MI

Specifications
- Mass: M1907: 111,900 pounds (50,800 kg) M1907MI: 118,700 pounds (53,800 kg); M1909: 139,240 pounds (63,160 kg) M1910: 137,300 pounds (62,300 kg)
- Length: M1907: 495 inches (1,260 cm) M1907MI: 495 inches (1,260 cm); M1909: 579 inches (1,470 cm) M1910: 579 inches (1,470 cm)
- Barrel length: M1907 & M1907MI: 34 calibers (476 inches (1,210 cm)); M1909 & M1910: 40 calibers (560 inches (1,400 cm))
- Shell: separate loading, bag powder charge, 1,660 pounds (750 kg) AP shot & shell
- Caliber: 14 inches (356 mm)
- Breech: Interrupted screw, De Bange type
- Carriage: M1907, M1907MI, and M1910 guns: M1907 & M1907MI disappearing M1909 gun: M1909 turret
- Elevation: disappearing: -5° to +15°, turret: -0.09° to +15°
- Traverse: disappearing: 170°, turret: 360° (varied with surrounding structures)
- Muzzle velocity: M1907 and M1907MI: 2,150 feet per second (660 m/s); M1909 and M1910: 2,220 feet per second (680 m/s)
- Maximum firing range: disappearing: 25,000 yards (23,000 m)
- Feed system: hand
- Sights: Telescopic

The 14-inch Gun M1907 (356 mm) and its variants the M1907MI, M1909, and M1910 were large coastal artillery pieces installed to defend major American seaports between 1895 and 1945. They were operated by the United States Army Coast Artillery Corps. Most were installed on single gun disappearing carriages; the only installation with four guns in twin turrets was built at the unique Fort Drum in Manila Bay, Philippines. All of the weapons not in the Philippines were scrapped when World War II brought about a general upgrade.

== History ==
In 1885, William C. Endicott, President Grover Cleveland's Secretary of War, was tasked with creating the Board of Fortifications to review seacoast defenses. The findings of the board illustrated a grim picture of existing defenses in its 1886 report and recommended a massive $127 million construction program of breech-loading guns, mortars, floating batteries, and submarine (underwater) minefields for some 29 locations on the US coastline. Most of the Board's recommendations were implemented. Coast Artillery fortifications built between 1885 and 1905 are often referred to as Endicott period fortifications.

After the Spanish–American War, the government wanted to protect American seaports in the event of war, and also protect newly gained territory, such as the Philippines and Cuba, from enemy attack. A new Board of Fortifications, under President Theodore Roosevelt's Secretary of War William Taft, was convened in 1905. Taft recommended technical changes, such as more searchlights, electrification, and in some cases less guns in particular fortifications. The seacoast forts were funded under the Spooner Act of 1902 and construction began within a few years and lasted into the 1920s. The defenses of the Philippines on islands in Manila Bay were built under this program. 14-inch guns were emplaced in the harbor defenses of Los Angeles, the Panama Canal, Honolulu, Hawaii, and Manila Bay, Philippines, all constructed under the Taft program. Except for Fort Drum, the guns were on disappearing carriages; when the gun was fired, it dropped behind a concrete and/or earthen wall for protection from counter-battery fire.

=== 14-inch gun M1907 and M1907MI ===
The M1907 was a wire-wound gun 34 calibers long. The M1907MI was a built-up gun (the usual US practice) of the same length. Twelve were deployed, all on M1907 disappearing carriages. Four were in Hawaii and eight were in the Panama Canal Zone.

=== 14-inch gun M1909 ===
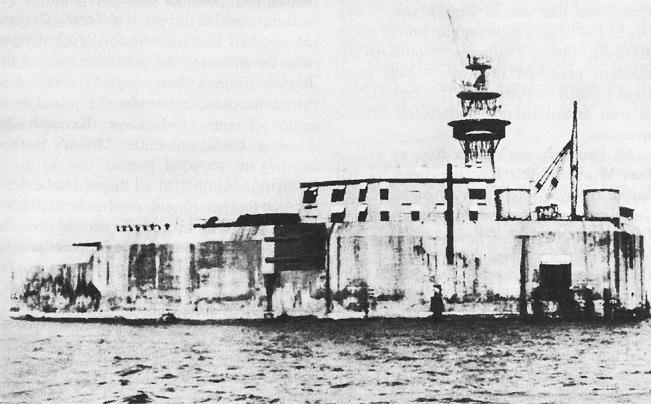
Fort Drum in Manila Bay, called the “concrete battleship”, was a unique fort mounting four 14-inch guns in two twin turrets.

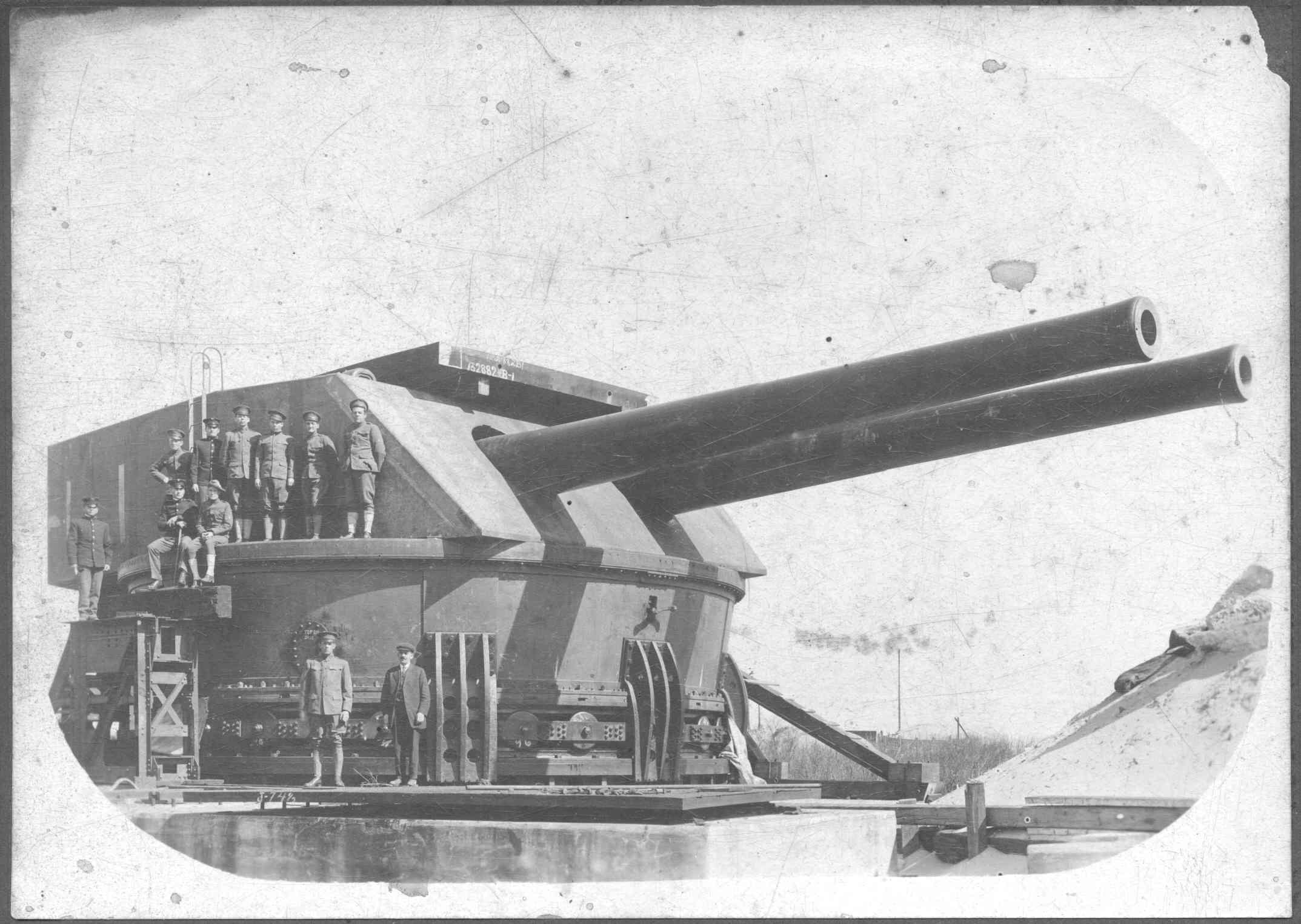
A twin 14-inch turret made for Fort Drum being tested at the Sandy Hook Proving Ground.

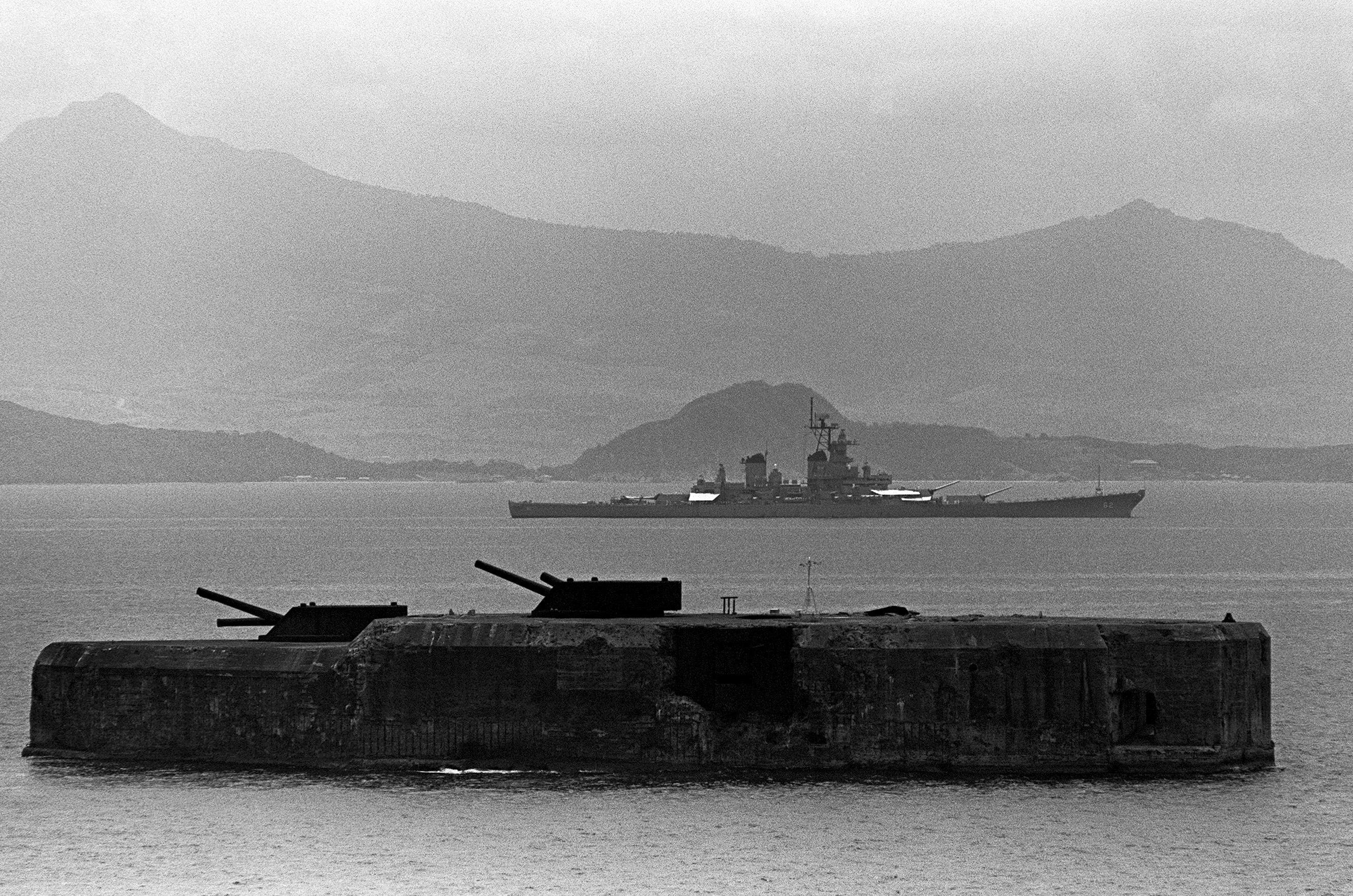
Fort Drum in 1983 with USS New Jersey (BB-62) behind the fort.

The M1909 was a wire-wound gun 40 calibers long designed specifically for the turrets of Fort Drum on El Fraile Island in Manila Bay, Philippines. An unusual design feature was that it was made without trunnions. The turrets were made by Newport News Shipbuilding. Fort Drum was built by razing the small island down to the water and building a massive concrete fort on it. The fort had four 14-inch M1909 guns in two twin M1909 turrets, with four 6-inch M1908 guns in casemates on the sides. Despite holding out against Japanese bombardment, the fort was surrendered after destroying the guns along with Corregidor on 6 May 1942. It was recaptured in April 1945 by Company F of the 2nd Battalion, 151st Infantry Regiment, 38th Infantry Division, and a detachment of the 113th Engineer Combat Battalion of the same division. The engineers lowered a 500-pound TNT charge into the structure with a 30-minute time fuze. They then pumped in 3400 gallons of fuel consisting of 75% diesel and 25% gasoline.

=== 14-inch gun M1910 ===
The M1910 was a wire-wound gun 40 calibers long. Eight were deployed, all on M1907 disappearing carriages. Locations included Fort Frank and Fort Hughes in Manila Bay (2 guns each) as well as Fort MacArthur, San Pedro, Los Angeles, CA (4 guns).

=== World War II ===
Along with other coast artillery weapons, the 14-inch guns in the Philippines saw action in the Japanese invasion in World War II. Since they were positioned against a naval attack, they were poorly sited to engage the Japanese. Except for Fort Drum's turrets, whose guns were in action until the surrender, the open mountings were vulnerable to air and high-angle artillery attack; their only protection was camouflage nets. Destruction procedures were executed on all the guns prior to the surrender of US forces on 6 May 1942.

In 1940–44, 16-inch gun batteries were constructed at most harbor defenses, and all 14-inch guns not in the Philippines were scrapped in 1943–44.

== Surviving examples ==
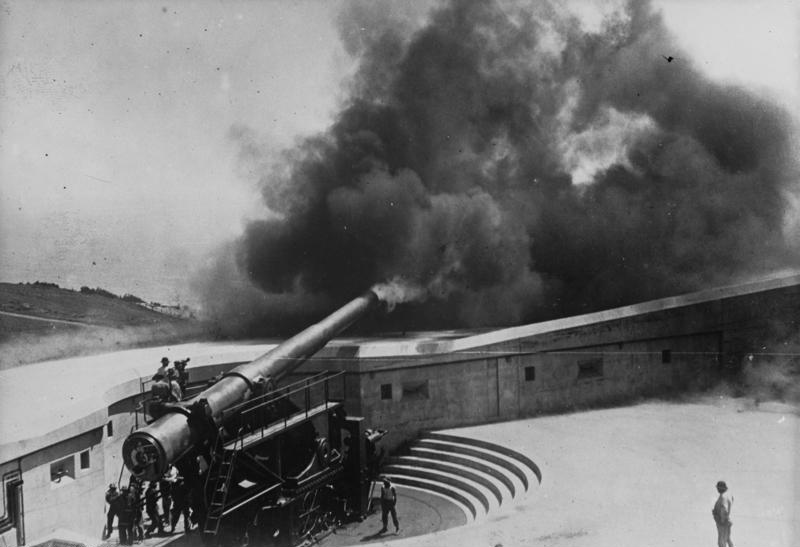
14-inch M1910MI gun fires at Fort MacArthur, San Pedro, California.

Six 14-inch guns of this type remain in the Philippines.

1. Two 14-inch Guns M1909 (#4 & #3 Watervliet) in one Turret M1909 (#1 Newport News), Battery John M. Wilson, Fort Drum, El Fraile Island, Philippines.

2. Two 14-inch Guns M1909 (#2 & #1 Watervliet) in one Turret M1909 (#2 Newport News), Battery William L. Marshall, Fort Drum, El Fraile Island, Philippines.

3. One 14-inch Gun M1910 (#15 Watervliet) on Disappearing Carriage M1907MI (#20 Watervliet), Battery Gillespie, Fort Hughes, Caballo Island, Philippines.

4. One 14-inch Gun M1910 (#8 Watervliet) on Disappearing Carriage M1907MI (#17 Watervliet), Battery Woodruff, Fort Hughes, Caballo Island, Philippines.

== See also ==
- Seacoast defense in the United States
- Battle of Corregidor
- Coast Artillery fire control system
- 10-inch gun M1895
- 12-inch gun M1895
- List of U.S. Army weapons by supply catalog designation
- United States War Department Forms

=== Weapons of comparable role, performance and era ===
- 14"/45 caliber gun contemporary US Navy equivalent
- EOC 14 inch /45 naval gun contemporary British equivalent
- Vickers 14 inch/45 naval gun contemporary Vickers-designed Japanese equivalent
