= Carle Augustus Woodruff =

United States Army general

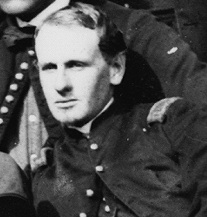
- Woodruff in September 1863
- Born: August 8, 1841; Buffalo, New York
- Died: July 20, 1913 (aged 71); Raleigh, North Carolina
- Burial place: Historic Oakwood Cemetery, Raleigh, North Carolina
- Military career
- Allegiance: United States; Union
- Branch: Union Army
- Service years: 1861 - 1903
- Rank: Brigadier General
- Conflicts: American Civil War; *Battle of Gettysburg; *Battle of Trevilian Station; *Battle of Cold Harbor
- Awards: Medal of Honor

Carle Augustus Woodruff (August 8, 1841 – July 20, 1913), was a career soldier in the United States Army who rose to the rank of brigadier general. He received the Medal of Honor while serving as an artillery officer in the Union Army during the American Civil War.

== Early life and Civil War ==
Woodruff was born in Buffalo, New York, the son of Colonel Israel Carle Woodruff (1815–1878). He was commissioned as a Second Lieutenant in the 2nd U.S. Artillery at Washington, D.C. Serving with Combined Batteries B and L, 2nd U.S. Artillery, he was part of the U.S. Horse Artillery Brigade in the Army of the Potomac. As a section chief, he was cited for gallantry during an engagement at Newby's Crossroads, Virginia, on July 24, 1863, and received the Medal of Honor.

Medal of Honor

Woodruff was eventually awarded the Medal of Honor for these actions, on September 1, 1893. He was also awarded brevet promotions for gallantry at the battles of Gettysburg (brevet captain, July 3, 1863) and Trevilian Station (brevet major, June 11, 1864), and for good conduct during the war (lieutenant colonel, March 13, 1865). Serving primarily as a section chief, Woodruff commanded Battery M, 2nd U.S. Artillery, at the Battle of Cold Harbor, June 3, 1864.

== Medal of Honor citation ==
Rank and organization: First Lieutenant, 2d U.S. Artillery. Place and date: At Newbys Crossroads, Va., 24 July 1863. Entered service at: Washington, D.C. Born: Buffalo, N.Y. Date of issue: 1 September 1893.

Citation:

The President of the United States of America, in the name of Congress, takes pleasure in presenting the Medal of Honor to First Lieutenant (Field Artillery) Carle Augustus Woodruff, United States Army, for extraordinary heroism on 24 July 1863, while serving with Horse Battery M, 2d U.S. Artillery, in action at Newbys Crossroads, Virginia. While in command of a section of a battery constituting a portion of the rear guard of a division then retiring before the advance of a corps of Infantry, First Lieutenant Woodruff was attacked by the enemy and ordered to abandon his guns. He disregarded the orders received and aided in repelling the attack and saving the guns.

== Postbellum service ==
Woodruff remained in the regular army after the Civil War, and gained his captaincy in 1869. He rose steadily through the officers corps, to major of the 2nd U.S. Artillery (1894), lieutenant colonel of the 7th U.S. Artillery (1899), and colonel of the Corps of Artillery, 1901. By the end of his career, he ranked as a brigadier general.

Woodruff was a companion of the Ohio Commandery of the Military Order of the Loyal Legion of the United States.

He died in Raleigh, North Carolina, and was buried there at Oakwood Cemetery. His grave can be found in the Magnolia Hill section, Lot 25.

== Namesakes ==
Battery Woodruff at Fort Hughes is named for him. In Raleigh, NC, the Carle A. Woodruff Lodge of the Perfection, Ancient and Accepted Scottish Rite of Freemasonry is also named for him.

== See also ==
- List of Medal of Honor recipients
