= 91st Coast Artillery (United States) =

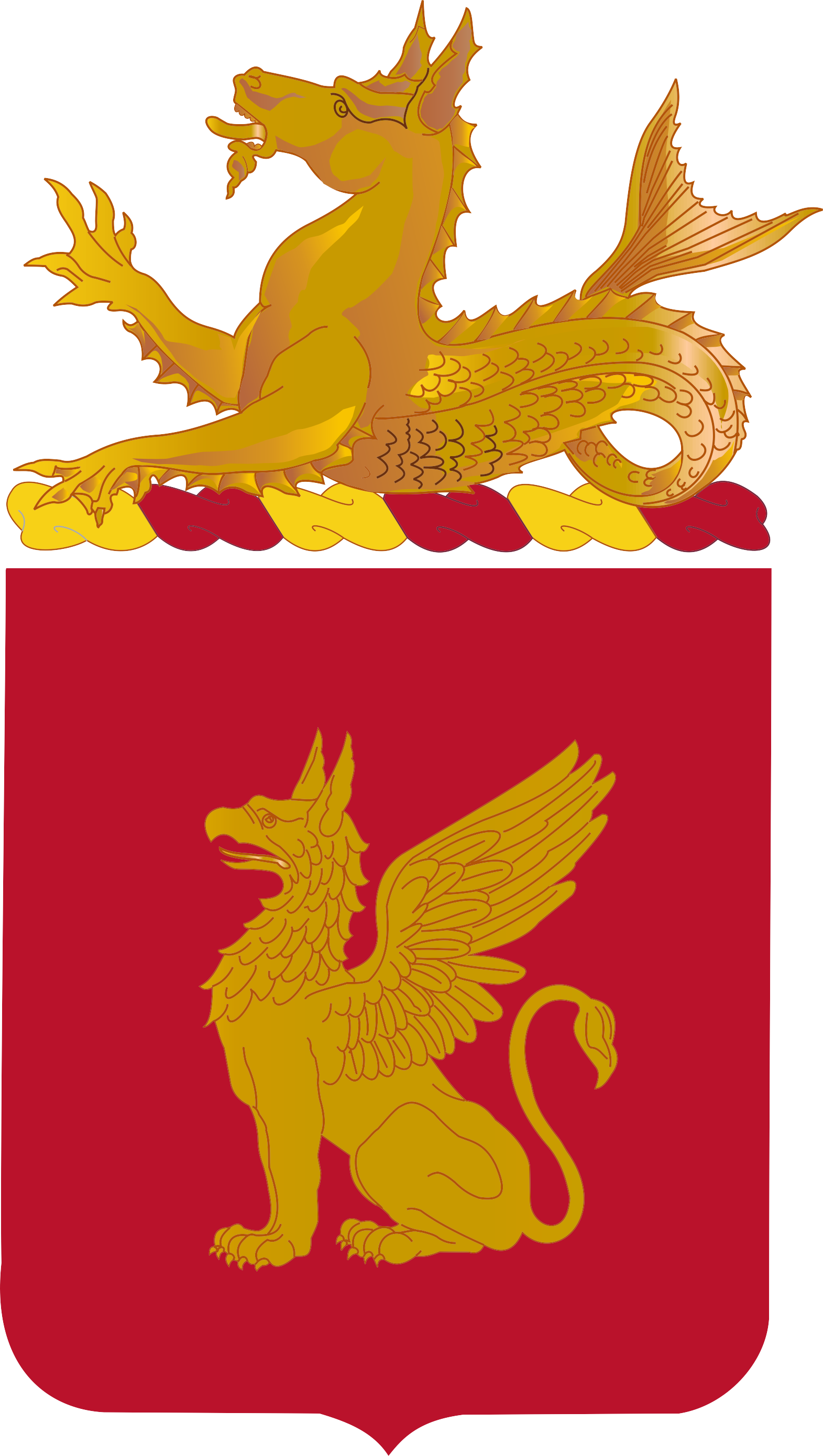
- Coat of arms
- Active: 1924 - 28 June 1950
- Country: United States
- Branch: Army
- Type: Coast artillery
- Size: Regiment
- Garrison/HQ: Fort Mills
- Mottos: "Versus Et Fidelis Semper" (Always True and Faithful)
- Colors: Scarlet
- Mascot: Oozlefinch

Commanders
- Notable commanders: Colonel Joseph P. Kohn

The 91st Coast Artillery Regiment was a Coast Artillery Corps regiment in the United States Army, part of the Philippine Scouts. It was a Regular Army unit composed primarily of Filipino enlisted men and US officers.

== History ==
During the Philippines Campaign of 1941/1942 this unit operated a wide variety of equipment and manned the following batteries. All of these batteries were at Fort Mills, Corregidor unless otherwise noted.

- A Battery stockade/Mine casemate
- B Battery Rock Point
- C Battery Morrison/Grubbs
- D Battery Sunset
- E Battery Ermita (AA) Fort Frank
- F Battery Crofton Fort Frank
- G Battery Ramsey/Mine casemate

Constituted 1924 as 91st CA (HD) Regt (PS) and organized 1 July 1924 at Fort Mills. Organized by redesignating 281st, 282nd, 284th, 277th, 279th, 286th, 276th, & 285th Cos, Philippine Scouts (organized 12-18-22) as HHB and Btrys A-G respectively. HHBs 1st and 2nd Bns activated 6-3-24 at Fort Mills. Initial disposition: Regimental HHB and Btrys A & B stationed at Ft. Mills; Btrys C, D, & E stationed at Fort Hughes; Btry F at Fort Frank, and Btry G at Fort Wint. Manned fixed and mobile seacoast guns. Redesignated TD regiment 1935. Surrendered 5-6-42 as Philippines campaign (1941–1942) ended. Disbanded 28 June 1950.

== Distinctive unit insignia ==
- Description

A Gold color metal and enamel device 1 1/4 (3.18 cm) in height on and within an annulet Gules bearing on lower part the motto “VERUS ET FIDELIS SEMPER” Or a shield of the first charged with a griffin sejant, wings elevated and addorsed, of the second.

- Symbolism

The griffin is a fictitious animal, half eagle, half lion, and symbolizes strength and watchfulness. Red and gold are the colors of the Artillery. The motto translates to “Always True and Faithful.”

- Background

The distinctive unit insignia was approved on 3 April 1928. It was rescinded/cancelled on 14 March 1975.

== Coat of arms ==
=== Blazon ===
- Shield

Gules, a griffin sejant, wings elevated and addorsed, Or.

- Crest

On a wreath of the colors Or and Gules a sea horse naiant Or. Motto: VERUS ET FIDELIS SEMPER (Always True and Faithful).

=== Symbolism ===
- Shield

The griffin is a fictitious animal, half eagle, half lion, and symbolizes strength and watchfulness. Red and gold are the colors of the Artillery.

- Crest

The sea horse is taken from the coat of arms of the Harbor Defenses of Manila and Subic Bays and denotes that the unit was organized in these Harbor Defenses, and it also alludes to the activities of the organization near the seashore.

=== Background ===
The coat of arms was approved on 3 April 1928. It was rescinded/cancelled on 14 March 1975.
