= Fort Hughes =

WW2-era fort in the Philippines

Coordinates: 14°22′N 120°37′E

- Caballo Island, Philippines
- Part of Harbor Defenses of Manila and Subic Bays
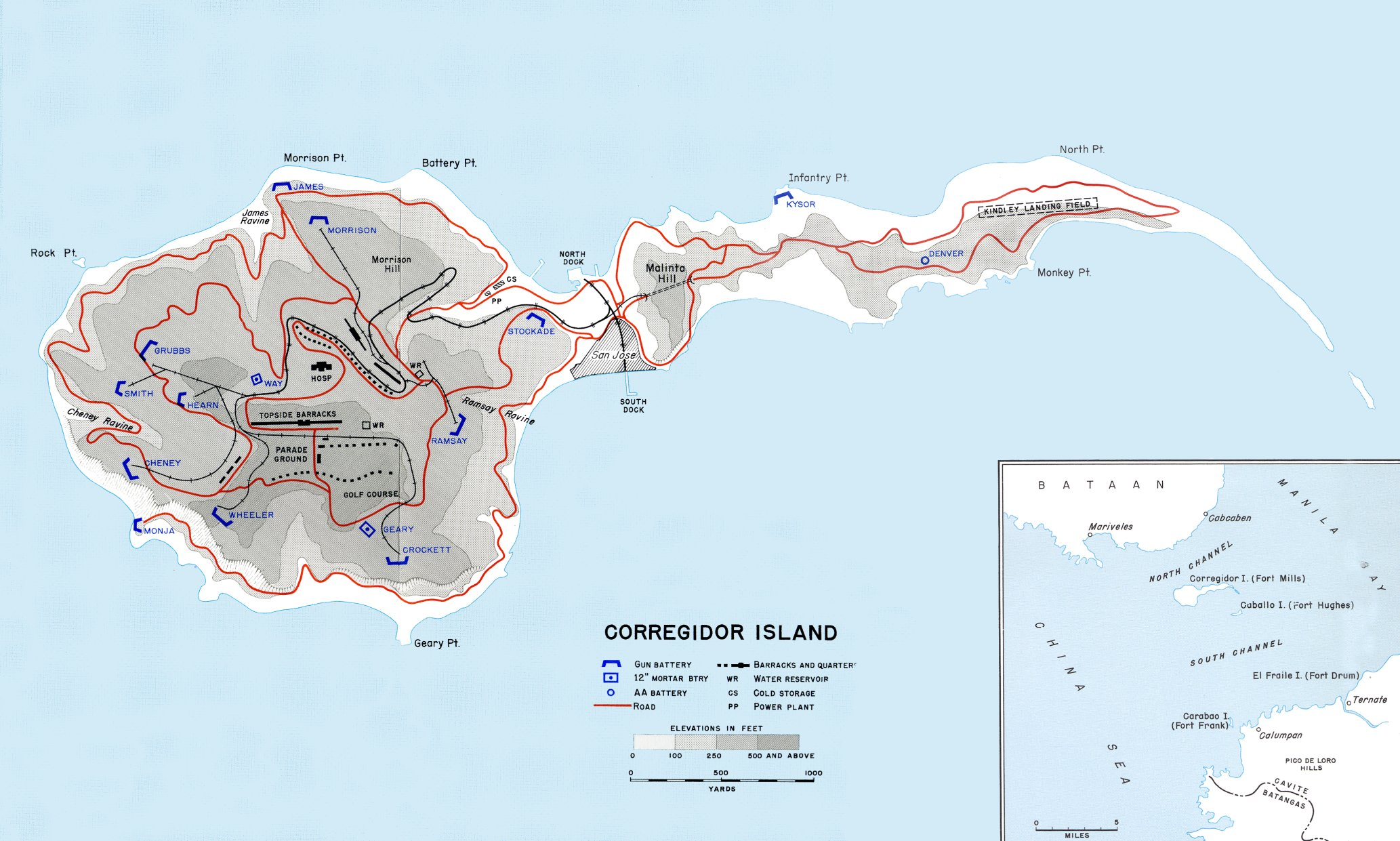
- Manila Bay forts in WWII (inset)

Site information
- Controlled by: United States

Site history
- Built: completed 1914
- Built by: United States Army Corps of Engineers
- Battles/wars: Philippines campaign (1941–1942); Philippines Campaign (1944–1945)

Garrison information
- Garrison: 59th Coast Artillery; 91st Coast Artillery; 92nd Coast Artillery

Fort Hughes was built by the Philippine Department of the U.S. Army on Caballo Island in the Philippines in the early 1900s. The fort, which part of the Harbor Defenses of Manila and Subic Bays, was named for Major General Robert Patterson Hughes, a veteran of the American Civil War, Spanish–American War, and the Philippine–American War.

== History ==
=== Spanish–American War ===
A Spanish battery of three 6-inch (152 mm) naval guns from the Spanish navy cruiser Velasco was on the eastern end of the island in 1898, but was not engaged in the Battle of Manila Bay.

=== Construction ===
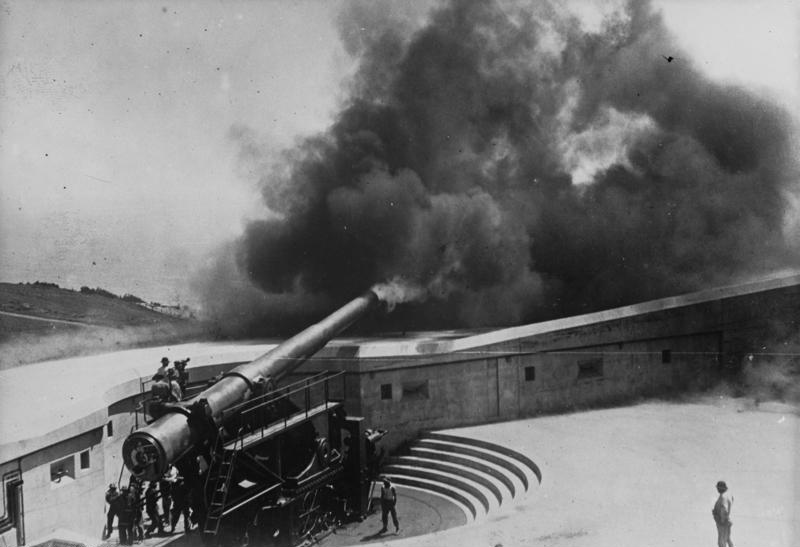
Fort Hughes was armed with 14-inch (356 mm) M1910 guns like these shown firing at Fort MacArthur, San Pedro, California in 1931.

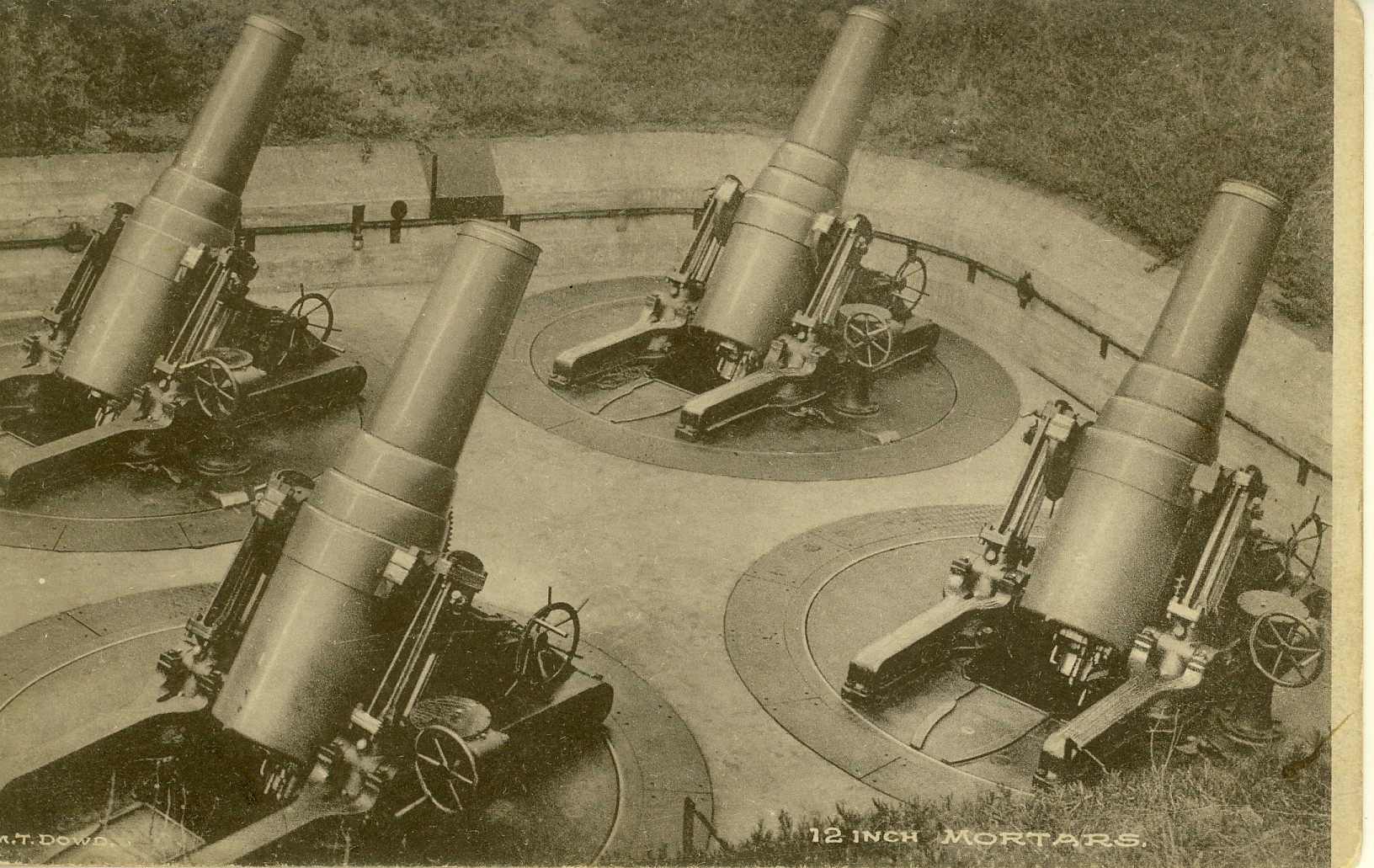
The fort had several 12-inch (305 mm) mortars sited at Battery Craighill

The initial construction on Fort Hughes was largely complete by 1914 except the mortar battery, completed in 1919. The initial gun batteries were:

Name	No. of guns	Gun type	Carriage type	Years active
Gillespie	1	14-inch (356 mm) gun M1910	disappearing M1907	1914-1942
Woodruff	1	14-inch (356 mm) gun M1910	disappearing M1907	1914-1942
Craighill	4	12-inch (305 mm) mortar M1912	barbette M1896MIII	1919-1942
Leach	2	6-inch (152 mm) gun M1908	disappearing M1905	1914-1942
Fuger	2	3-inch (76 mm) gun M1903	pedestal M1903	1914-1942

Circa 1940 an antiaircraft battery of four 3-inch (76 mm) guns on mobile mounts was added on the eastern end of the island, known as Battery Idaho. During 1941 Battery Williams was built, with three 155 mm (6.1 in) mobile guns on concrete "Panama mounts". At some time after the commencement of hostilities in December 1941, one of these guns was detached as Battery Hooker.

Battery Gillespie was named for Major General George Lewis Gillespie Jr., Chief of Engineers 1901–1903. Battery Woodruff was named for Brigadier General Carle Augustus Woodruff, a Civil War Medal of Honor recipient. Battery Craighill was named for Brigadier General William Price Craighill, Chief of Engineers 1895–1897. Battery Leach was named for Colonel Smith Stallard Leach, an engineer officer. Battery Fuger was named for Lt. Col. Frederick Füger, a Civil War Medal of Honor recipient. Battery Williams was named for 1st. Lt. George R. Williams, a Philippine Scouts officer killed at Abucay, Bataan in January 1942. Battery Idaho was named for the state of Idaho; the anti-aircraft batteries had US place names corresponding to which battery was manning them, in this case Battery I of the 59th Coast Artillery.

=== World War II ===
Fort Hughes was occupied by Japanese forces after their conquest of the Philippines. The fort was surrendered along with Corregidor and all other US and Filipino forces in the islands on 6 May 1942. The fort's garrison executed destruction procedures on their guns prior to their surrender and the Japanese occupation. The Japanese were able to salvage the 3-inch guns of Battery Fuger and redeploy them at the Malinta Tunnel on Corregidor. Also, Battery Idaho's four AA guns were redeployed to Clark Field.

American forces retook the fort from the Japanese during the liberation of the Philippines in 1945, beginning on 27 March 1945. The 2nd Battalion, 151st Infantry Regiment and other elements of the 38th Infantry Division amphibiously assaulted the island, following a brief but intense air and naval bombardment. Additional fire support came from the 163rd Field Artillery Battalion (105 mm howitzers) on Corregidor. The Japanese had prepared positions around the batteries and were able to shelter in the tunnels. Initial assaults were unsuccessful; the terrain was such that tanks could not bring their guns to bear on the Japanese positions. On 31 March an attempt was made to burn out the defenders by pouring diesel fuel down the only vent shaft accessible to the Americans. However, this did not work, as the diesel fuel could not be delivered up the sides of the battery fast enough. The commander of the 113th Engineer Battalion devised a solution using two diesel-filled pontoon cubes from the naval forces and a pump and flex hose from the air forces. On 5 April over 2,500 US gallons (9,500 L) of diesel fuel were pumped down the vent shaft and ignited using white phosphorus mortar rounds. This was repeated twice more on 6 and 7 April, followed by two demolition charges. The next few days were occupied with probing infantry attacks and attempts to persuade the surviving Japanese to surrender. On 13 April the last defender was killed and the fort was reclaimed.

== Present ==
Both 14-inch guns and carriages and the 12-inch mortars remain in place. Battery Leach was destroyed in the recapture operation, but one 6-inch gun barrel remains. One Japanese 120 mm gun is also on the island. The island was turned over to Filipino forces in 1946, and as of 2012 was a Philippine Navy ammunition depot.

== See also ==
- Harbor Defenses of Manila and Subic Bays
- Geography of the Philippines
- Military History of the Philippines
- Military History of the United States
- Seacoast defense in the United States
- United States Army Coast Artillery Corps
