= 12-inch coast defense mortar =

American artillery

M1890M1 12-inch mortar
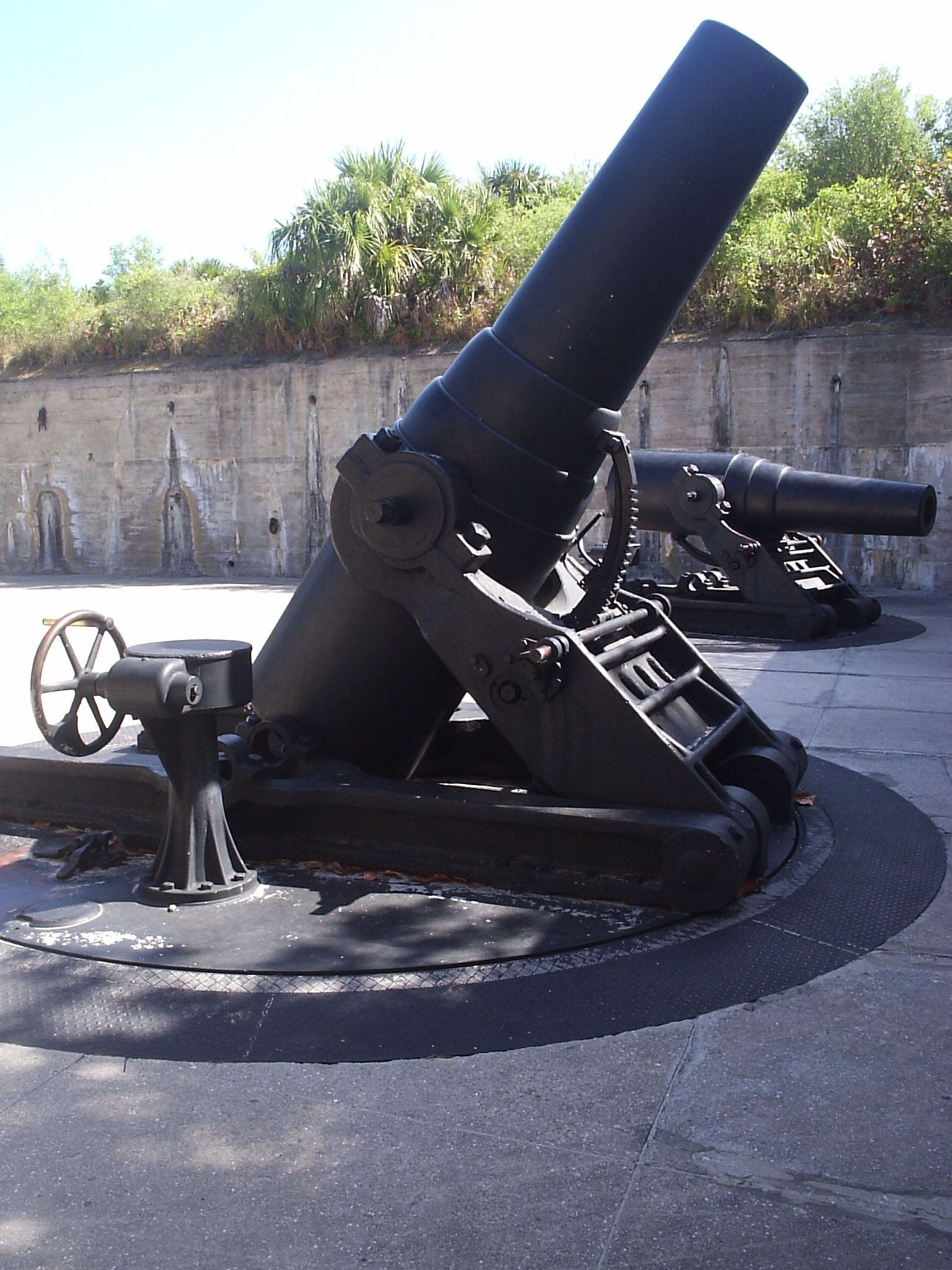
- An M1890 M1 12-inch mortar elevated to firing position. The mortar in the background has been depressed to loading position.
- Type: Coastal artillery; Railway gun
- Place of origin: United States

Service history
- In service: 1895–1945
- Used by: United States Army
- Wars: World War I; World War II

Production history
- Designer: Bureau of Ordnance
- Designed: 1890
- Manufacturer: Watervliet Arsenal

Specifications
- Mass: 29,120 lb (14.56 short tons) (with breech); 157,120 lb (78.56 short tons) (including mounting carriage)
- Length: 161 in (4,100 mm)
- Barrel length: 141.125 in (3,584.6 mm) bore (10 calibers)
- Crew: 12
- Shell: 700 lb (320 kg); 1,046 lb (474 kg)
- Caliber: 12 in (305 mm)
- Breech: Slotted screw
- Recoil: 23 in (580 mm) (M1896MI); 24 in (610 mm) (M1896MII)
- Elevation: 45° (minimum for firing); 70° (maximum for firing)
- Traverse: 360°
- Rate of fire: 1 round per minute (normal); 1.3 rounds per minute (maximum)
- Muzzle velocity: 1,500 ft/s (460 m/s) (700-lb shell); 1,050 ft/s (320 m/s) (1,046-lb shell)
- Effective firing range: 14,610 yd (13,360 m) (maximum 700-lb shell); 2,400 yd (2,200 m) (minimum 1,046-lb shell)

The 12-inch coast defense mortar was a weapon of 12-inch (305 mm) caliber emplaced during the 1890s and early 20th century to defend US harbors from seaborne attack. (Note: There was also a 13-inch (330 mm) smooth-bore muzzle-loading mortar, used during the Civil War (see Siege artillery in the American Civil War) and for about 15 years thereafter, which, although often used against land targets, was also called a "coast defense mortar".) In 1886, when the Endicott Board set forth its initial plan for upgrading the coast defenses of the United States, it relied primarily on mortars, not guns, to defend American harbors. (Note: The Board recommended "581 high power guns of heavy calibers and 724 heavy rifled mortars. In a total of 1,305 heavy guns, 55.5% [were] mortars.") Over the years, provision was made for fortifications that would mount some 476 of these weapons, although not all of these tubes were installed. (Note: Nevertheless, a quick search of the web indicates that this weapon was the largest caliber mortar that was widely deployed anywhere in the world at the time.) Ninety-one of these weapons were remounted as railway artillery in 1918-1919, but this was too late to see action in World War I. The railway mortars were only deployed in small quantities, and none overseas. The fixed mortars in the Philippines saw action in the Japanese invasion in World War II. All of the fixed mortars (except four) in the United States were scrapped by 1944, as new weapons replaced them, and the railway mortars were scrapped after the war.

The only remaining mortars of this type in the continental United States are four at Battery Laidley, part of Fort Desoto near St. Petersburg, Florida, but the remains of coast defense mortar emplacements can be seen at many former Coast Artillery forts across the United States and its former territories. Additional 12-inch mortars and other large-caliber weapons remain in the Philippines.

== The weapons ==
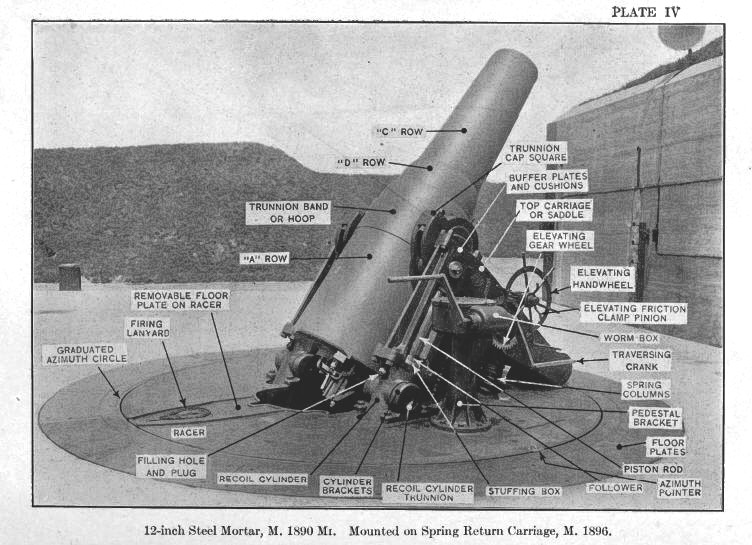
The 1890M1 mortar, the most common type employed

A scaled drawing of the early types of shells fired by the 12-inch mortar

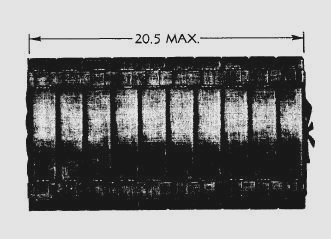
A powder charge for the M1890 mortar, made of up to 10 small powder bags strapped together. A larger powder charge increased the shell velocity, resulting in greater range.

The M1890M1 (Model of 1890, Modification 1) 12-inch mortar was one of the most powerful coast artillery pieces of its era, and was the most common type emplaced to guard U.S. harbors.

This mortar and other models, the M1886, M1908, and M1912, usually fired deck-piercing (also called armor-piercing) shells. These weighed from 700 to 1,046 pounds (318 to 474 kg) and had heavy, hardened steel caps designed to pierce a ship's deck armor before the shell exploded. These mortars, firing the half-ton shells at an elevation of 45 degrees, had a range of 12,019 yards (10,990 m) (about 7 miles).

The deck-piercing shells were usually the ammunition of choice, because even the heaviest battleships of the 1890-1920 period had relatively lightly armor on their main decks, so a plunging half-ton shell could inflict crippling damage. (Note: The half-ton deck-piercing mortar shells could penetrate between 6 and 12 inches (150 and 300 mm) of armor plate, depending upon the maximum height to which they were shot. Since shells fired at close range did not travel high enough to attain deck-piercing momentum, these mortars were generally not effective at close range.) Early on (from about 1890 to 1915), coast defense mortars were also supplied with so-called "torpedo shells" weighing 800 or 1,000 pounds (360 or 450 kg) (see illustration at right, below). These were thin-walled shells roughly 5 feet (1.5 m) in length that carried explosive charges of about 130 pounds (59 kg) and were meant to detonate upon contact with the deck of a ship, scattering fragments among the crew.

The M1890M1 mortar was most often installed on an M1896 carriage, which weighed 128,000 pounds; (Note: The M1896 carriage had massive recoil springs that extended into a 5-foot-deep (1.5 m) circular pit below the mortar's circular base (which was 14 ft in diameter). At almost all the former mortar batteries in the U.S., however, these mounting pits have now been filled in and capped with concrete, leaving only a "new-ish" concrete circle to mark the former position of the mortar.) the mortar and its carriage weighed a total of 78.5 tons. The carriage was geared to enable it to be turned (in azimuth) by means of a traversing crank with two handles, located on the right side of the piece. A ring marked in degrees of azimuth ran around the mortar, just outside the inner steel circle or "racer" that carried the carriage, and a soldier read a pointer on the racer to aim the mortar in direction. (Note: A crew member was tasked with using chalk to mark on the azimuth circle each new azimuth that was fired, a step that was supposed to help avoid hoped mistakes in aiming the piece.) The tube was raised or lowered (in elevation) by twin geared wheels with long spokes (resembling ship's wheels) that were located on either side of the carriage. The breech could be rapidly depressed to an almost level position for loading and then be quickly elevated for firing. (Note: A built-in interlock protected the mortar from being fired if its elevation was less than 42 degrees, preventing it from being fired at the wall of its emplacement.) Other carriages included the M1891 and M1908.

In addition to the elevation of its tube, the factor that determined the mortar's range was the size of the powder charge that was loaded into its breech, following the shell. The desired range for the mortar was specified in terms of zones. The smallest zone (shortest range) was Zone 1, and the largest (longest range) was Zone 9. With the so-called "aliquot charge" (shown in the photo at right), up to 9 equal-sized, disk-shaped bags of powder (each about 2 inches (51 mm) thick and containing 6.3 pounds (2.9 kg) of powder) could be attached to a 10th (or "base") bag, by means of cloth binding straps that were sewn to the base bag. Often the base bag was painted red, indicating that the powder assembly was to be loaded into the breech "red end last," so that it bumped up against the closing breech block (or faced the gunner). The red base bag also contained a small charge of black powder as an igniter. When the breech was closed, a detonator was inserted through the breech block and contacted the igniter, ready to set off the full powder charge.

Mortar firing circuit switches and magneto mounting shoe outside data booth, Battery Whitman Pit B, Ft. Andrews

The mortar could be fired in one of two ways: either electrically or manually (by the pull of a lanyard). And each method had its own type of detonator (electrical or friction). Electrical firing required first that the crew attach a wire to the electrical detonator, which protruded from the breech block. Second, the crew had to connect the firing cable coming out of the pit floor to the carriage of the individual mortar, out in the pit. Third, the circuit switch (usually located on the wall of the pit near the data booth) leading to the individual mortar had to be thrown into the closed (firing) position. Finally, the firing magneto, which was mounted on a special "shoe", often on the wall of the pit near the data booth, had to be cranked up and then released, sending the firing current out to the pit. Depending on the switch settings, the mortars in a given pit could be fired one at a time or all together. Lanyard firing had fewer fail-safe features, and was accomplished by a crewman who stood well behind the breech and pulled smartly on the lanyard to fire the individual mortar.

== Emplacement design history ==
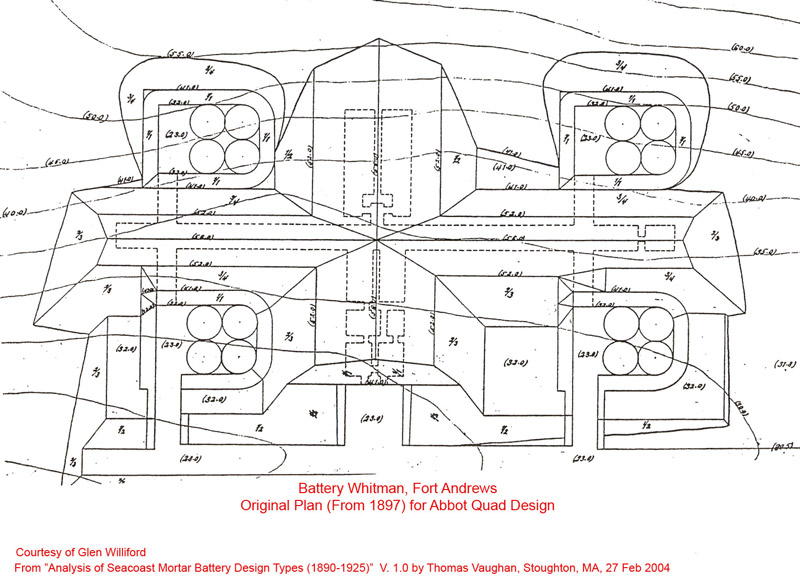
This was the original "Abbot Quad" plan for Battery Whitman, Fort Andrews.

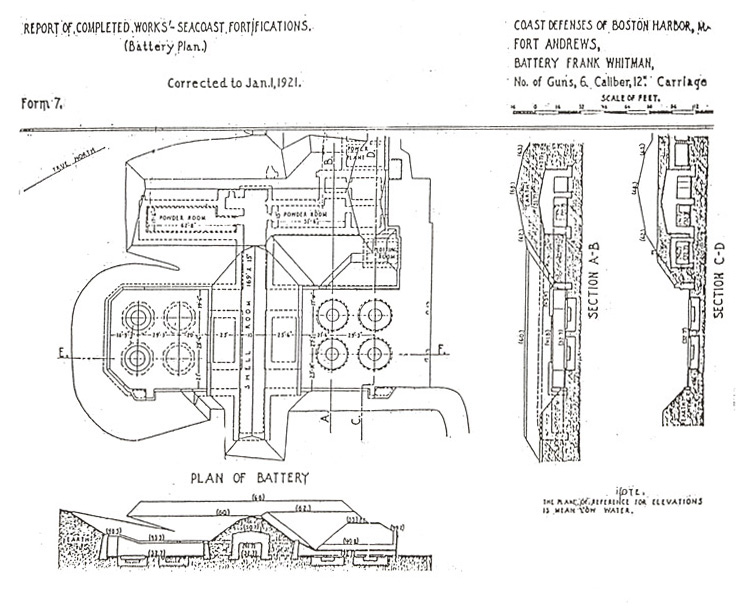
This later plan for Battery Whitman at Ft. Andrews enlarged the pits and kept only half of the original battery.

The earliest coast defense mortar batteries of the modern era were designed as so-called "Abbot Quads". Named for Gen. Henry Larcom Abbot, the Army engineer who invented the design, Abbot Quads were rectangular configurations of four rectangular mortar pits with four mortars per pit. Often these early pits had rounded corners and one open side which backed up to a magazine corridor or an open concrete pad, while the front side of the pit was protected by a high earthen bank or berm, making the pit invisible to attackers and almost impossible to hit from the sea. A plan for an Abbot Quad mortar battery is shown at left. The earthen prototype for these was built in the 1870s at Fort Totten in New York City, and construction of the first operational Abbot Quads commenced circa 1892.

The idea behind the Abbot Quad was to have all 16 mortars in the four pits fire at once, producing a shotgun-like salvo of plunging shells optimally dispersed to destroy an enemy ship. (Note: An article by General Abbot reports on the probability of hits to be achieved by firing 4-pit, 16-mortar salvos of mortars aimed in parallel, and claims the hit rate is about 10% at 6,000 yards (5,500 m). Abbot reports that 13 shells from a 16-mortar salvo at 6,000 yards (5,500 m) fell within a rectangle 150 yards (140 m) by 200 yards (180 m) (A battleship of the era was about 125 yards (114 m) long by 25 yards (23 m) wide.) Abbot himself used the "shotgun" analogy to describe these 16-tube salvos.) It was argued that targeting each mortar individually would not produce many more hits than salvo firing, since early fire control procedures and equipment were often error-prone. Furthermore, proponents of salvo firing pointed out that it made for easier command and control (particularly under battle conditions), since all mortars in all pits of a battery could be given the same firing data. Early battery designs often contained one central "firing room" from which cables ran out to the various mortar pits, enabling electrical firing of all weapons simultaneously. It is not clear, however, if this method of simultaneous firing for multiple pits (or even for four mortars in one pit) was ever put into practice.

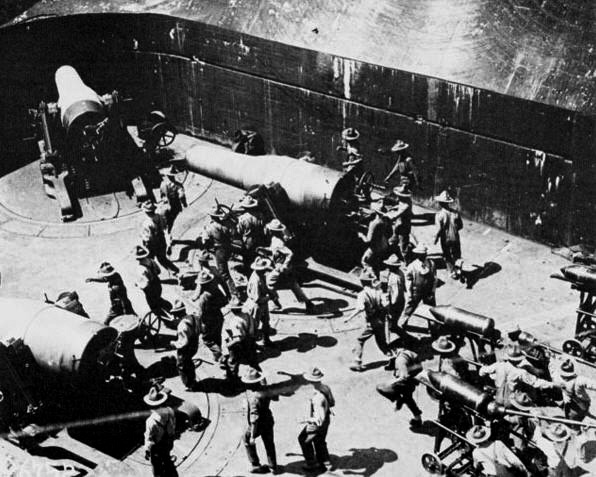
This photo shows a mortar pit of the Abbot Quad period. This illustrates the difficulty of reloading four mortars in this configuration. Three of four mortars and thirty crewmen are visible in the crowded space.

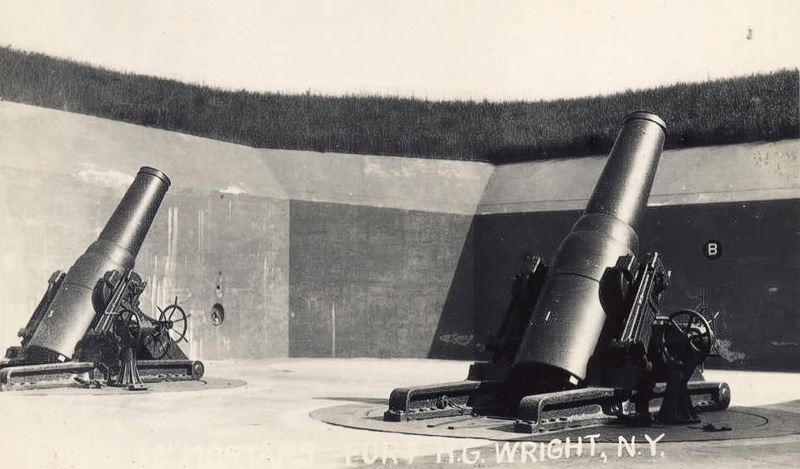
Later designs often mounted only two mortars in a single pit, like these at Fort Wright on Long Island Sound, NY.

A more panoramic postcard view of a two-mortar pit at Fort Wright

However, the early Abbot Quad designs featured very small mortar pits. Often, four mortars were mounted in a pit that was only about 40 by 50 feet (12 by 15 m) in size. (Note: The examples of pit size given here and below are taken from Battery Kellogg at Fort Banks, which was initially designed in 1892 and redesigned about 1905.) Four circular areas about 18 feet (5.5 m) in diameter would fit into one of these early pits, producing a very crowded situation (given that two adjacent M1890 mortars mounted in such a pit would have their muzzles almost touching if they were traversed to face each other). A photo of such an early "crowded pit" is shown at left.

When a mortar battery was fully manned, formal guidelines called for a pit containing just two mortars (see photo at right) to be manned by a pit commander, two mortar squads of 17 enlisted men each, and an ammunition squad of 16 enlisted men. One of the last (1942) versions of the manual for the 12-inch mortar gives details on how it was to be crewed and fired.

After about 1905, reliance on the Abbot Quad design declined. Some artillery officers (Note: A Board of Review on which sat the noted artilleryman John W. Ruckman (after whom Fort Ruckman was later named) took issue with the logic of the Abbot Quad.) argued that salvo firing was inherently wasteful, and that a much better hit ratio could be achieved by aiming each mortar individually against a specified target. They also argued that the smaller, cramped mortar pits of the early Abbot Quad battery designs were simply too crowded for efficient operations, with mortar crews for different tubes constantly getting in each other's way.

As fire control methods improved and the network of base end stations for the Coast Artillery fire control system was extended, from about 1905 on, individual aiming of mortars could be more accurate. At the same time, designs for new pits often specified only two mortars per pit, and newer forts had side-by-side, open-back mortar pits. Experience showed the time to reload four tightly-packed mortars in a pit was more than twice the time to reload two mortars in a pit. As a result, many 4-mortar pits were "depopulated," and some of their tubes were sent away to equip newer batteries.

== Firing the mortars ==
This film clip that dates from around 1915 shows a firing drill on the 12-inch mortars of Battery Howe, part of the Harbor Defenses of San Francisco. Although the battery shown is a linear one, the firing drill is similar to what would have taken place in a square or rectangular pit at Fort Banks. The film clip illustrates how congested one of the old-style pits would have become if used to fire four mortars simultaneously or nearly so.

The film shows the heavy shells (on shell carts) being wheeled up to the breeches of the mortars and rammed home, the powder bags being tossed into the breeches after them, the crew clearing the immediate area while the chief of the breech raises his arm to indicate "ready to fire," and the mortars being fired electrically (from outside the area pictured). The tubes are then depressed, crewmen rush back in to swab out the tubes and the process repeats.

The shock wave from firing just one of these huge mortars, particularly if it was fired within one of the smaller, old-style pits, was often so strong that it destroyed sensitive equipment mounted near the pit, knocked doors off nearby magazines and barracks, and broke windows in nearby neighborhoods. The thundering crash of four of these mortars being fired simultaneously in a pit must have been overwhelming.

== Fire control ==
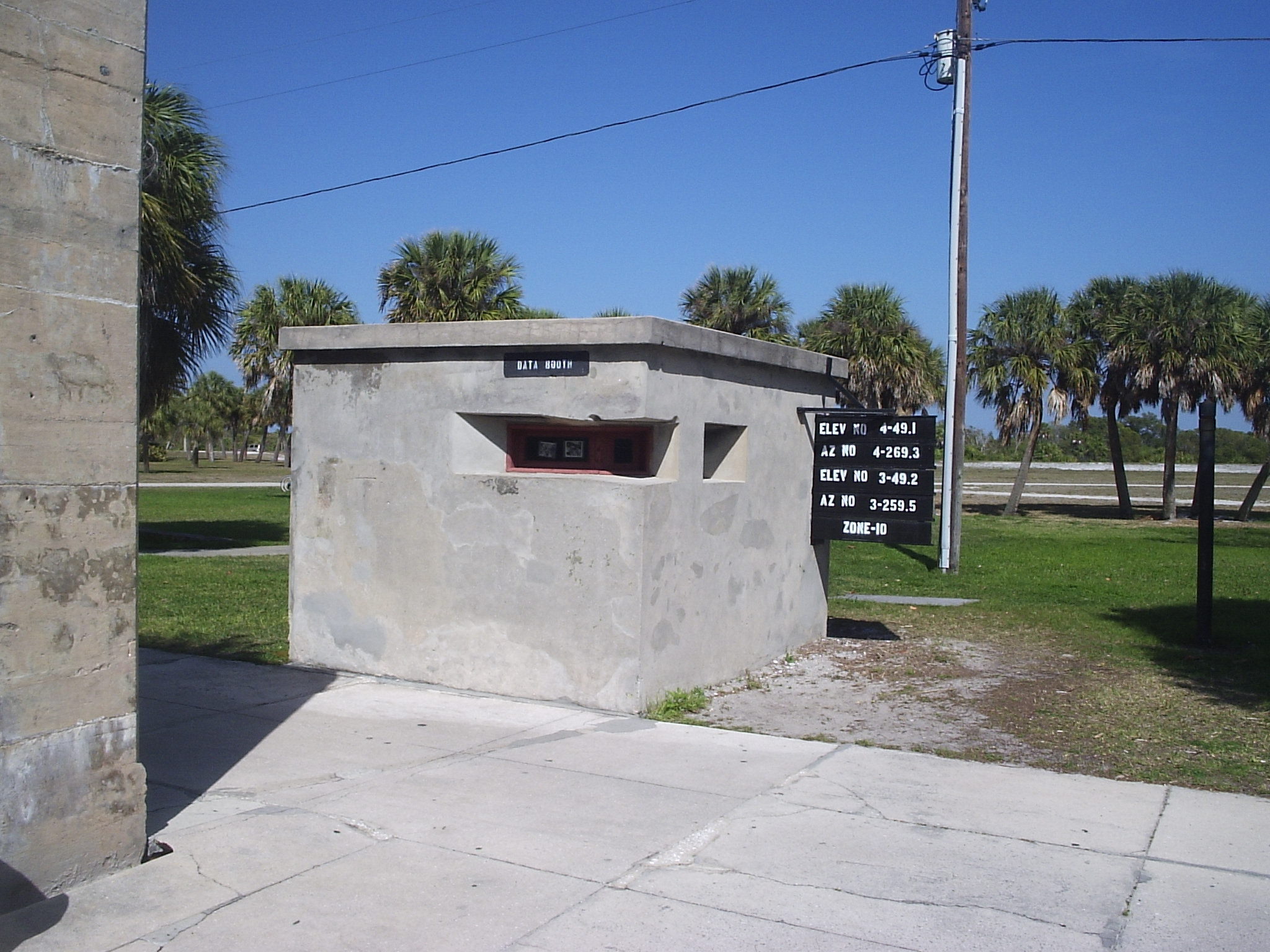
A data booth serving a mortar pit. The display board posted azimuth, elevation, and powder charge data for the mortars.

A freestanding data booth at Ft. Andrews, Boston, MA

A data booth at Battery Kellogg, Ft. Banks, Winthrop, MA, built into the wall of mortar pit B

The images here show another feature of the mortar pits—the data booth, part of the Coast Artillery fire control system. Personnel in this small space, with its tapered viewing slits, received the coordinates (azimuth and elevation) that had been calculated via plotting board by the battery's Range Unit as the firing coordinates for the mortars in order for them to hit their targets.

These booths were either small, free-standing structures, about 10 feet (3.0 m) square and 7 feet (2.1 m) tall (as shown here in the topmost photos), or were built into one of the walls of the mortar pit itself (lower photo at right). The reconstructed data board in the photo at left hangs off the side of the data booth and is used to post the firing coordinates for mortars #3 and #4 in its pit (evidently the only two mortars there). The "Zone" number posted on the board refers to the size of the powder charge to be loaded for the coming shot. The top photo at right shows a decomposed set of slats (which likely used to have slates attached to them) that could have firing data chalked onto them and then be slid out of the data booth so they could be seen by the mortar crews in the pit.

Since crews of the mortars could not see their targets, they were especially dependent on the overall fire control system, with its base end stations and plotting room, to locate and pinpoint targets for them to hit.

== Railway mortars ==
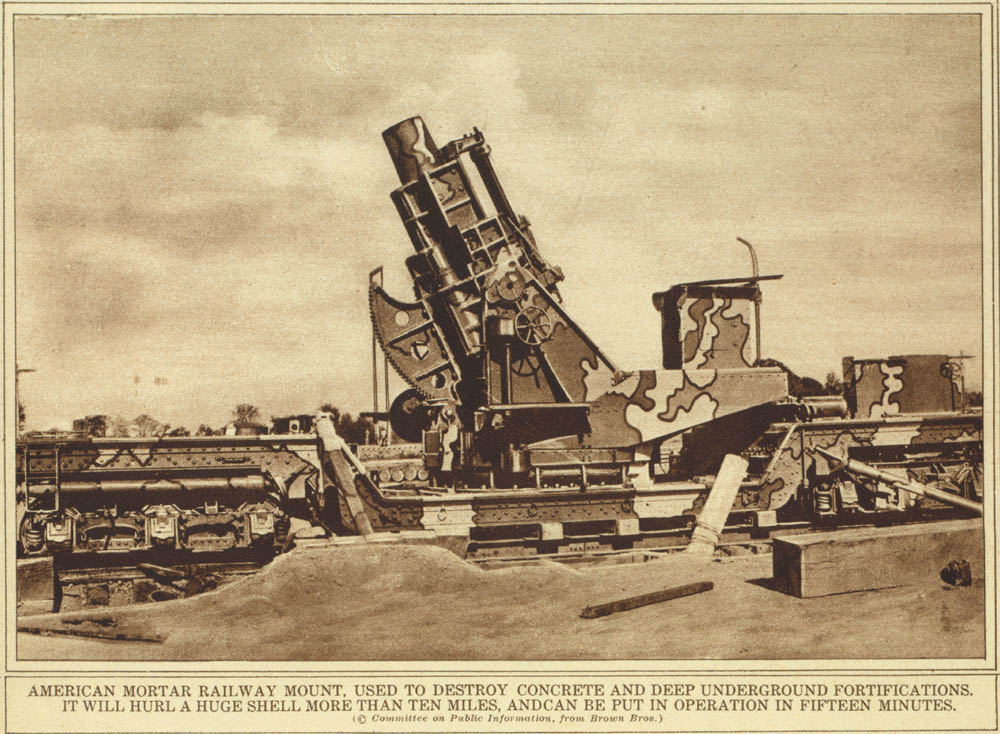
12-inch mortar on M1918 railway carriage

After the American entry into World War I on 6 April 1917, the US Army considered converting coast artillery weapons to railway mounts for use on the Western Front. Railway guns were in use by all the major belligerents in the war by that time. Among the weapons that could be spared from fixed defenses were 150 12-inch mortars, removed from 4-mortar pits. Contracts were let for mounting 91 mortars on railway carriages known as the M1918 Carriage (Railway). A hydro-pneumatic recuperator and outriggers allowed for all-around fire from the railway mounting, which weighed 88 tons. Forty-five railway mortar carriages were completed by the Morgan Engineering Company of Alliance, Ohio by 7 April 1919. All 91 contracted mortars were eventually mounted; one source states that all of these were the M1890. The following footnoted article shows the firing of an M1890 mortar on a railway mounting. Since the mounting permitted all-around fire and thus tracking of a moving target, the 12-inch railway mortar (along with 8-inch guns and twelve 7-inch guns on similar carriages) was retained after World War I for future coast defense use. The Army conducted tests with railway mortars in the 1930s. Some (probably four) of the railway mortars were assigned to Battery C, 52nd Railway Artillery Battalion, and tested at the Sandy Hook Proving Ground at Fort Hancock, New Jersey and also at Fort Miles, Delaware. During World War II, a battery of four railway mortars was among the temporary harbor defenses of Grays Harbor, Washington, and emplacements for an additional battery at Cape George, Washington were constructed but never armed.

== Combat service ==
Probably the only US 12-inch mortars to see action were those in the Philippines in 1942, particularly Battery Way and Battery Geary at Fort Mills on Corregidor. These batteries totaled twelve mortars and were used in the fight against the Japanese invasion. However, as with other US pre-1940 fortifications, most of which were designed well before the airplane was invented, the open-topped emplacements left the mortars open to air and high-angle artillery attack. All but two of the batteries' mortars were knocked out by the latter, all but one of Battery Geary's by a single hit that penetrated the magazine. The mortar batteries had mostly armor-piercing ammunition which would penetrate into the ground before exploding, and therefore was less effective than high explosive ammunition against ground forces. Other 12-inch mortars were at Battery Koehler on Carabao Island (Fort Frank), which was used for ineffectual counter-battery fire against the Japanese Kondo Detachment artillery emplaced on the southern shore of Manila Bay, and at Battery Craighill on Caballo Island (Fort Hughes), which fired at targets generated locally and from Corregidor. Battery Craighill was manned by naval personnel from the gunboat Mindanao. All forts were surrendered on 6 May 1942 along with Corregidor. Ten mortars remain at Batteries Way and Geary while four mortars remain at Fort Hughes as of 2014.

In the desperate defense of Corregidor an attempt was made to use these mortars as antiaircraft weapons. Three types of fuzes were tried: powder train and mechanical time fuzes for 3-inch AA guns, and a shrapnel fuze for 155 mm GPF field guns. None of these resulted in detonation of the mortar shell. The leading theories were that either the low rotational velocity of the shell or the small booster charge in the fuzes precluded detonation.

== Surviving examples ==
Nineteen 12-inch mortars survive, mostly in the Philippines, with four at Fort DeSoto on Mullet Key near St. Petersburg, Florida.

- 4 mortars M1890MI (Watervliet #173, 174, 170, 172) on M1896MI carriages (Watertown #158, 151, 241, 150) at Battery Way, Fort Mills, Corregidor, Philippines
- 2 mortars M1890MI (Bethlehem #31, 40) on M1896MI carriages (Unk. mfr., #104, 210) at Battery Geary Pit A, Fort Mills, Corregidor, Philippines
- 4 mortars M1908 (Watervliet #2, 22, 13, 12) on M1908 carriages (Unk. mfr., #17, 20, 19, 18) at Battery Geary Pit B, Fort Mills, Corregidor, Philippines
- 4 mortars M1912 (Watervliet #40, 39, 41, 38) on M1896MIII carriages (Watertown #41, 40, 38, 39) at Battery Craighill Pits A and B, Fort Hughes, Caballo Island, Philippines
- 4 mortars M1890MI (Watervliet #22, 86, 132, 135) on M1896MI carriages (American Hoist #183, 184, 185, 187) at Battery Laidley Pits A and B, Fort DeSoto, Mullet Key, Florida
- 1 mortar M1911, (Unk. mfr., #8) without carriage (non-standard training dummy) at the visitor center, Fort Wadsworth, Staten Island, New York

== See also ==
- Battery Way
- Seacoast defense in the United States
- List of heavy mortars
- List of U.S. Army weapons by supply catalog designation SNL E-13
