= Gen. E. O. C. Ord (1909 Mineplanter) =

US Army mine planter

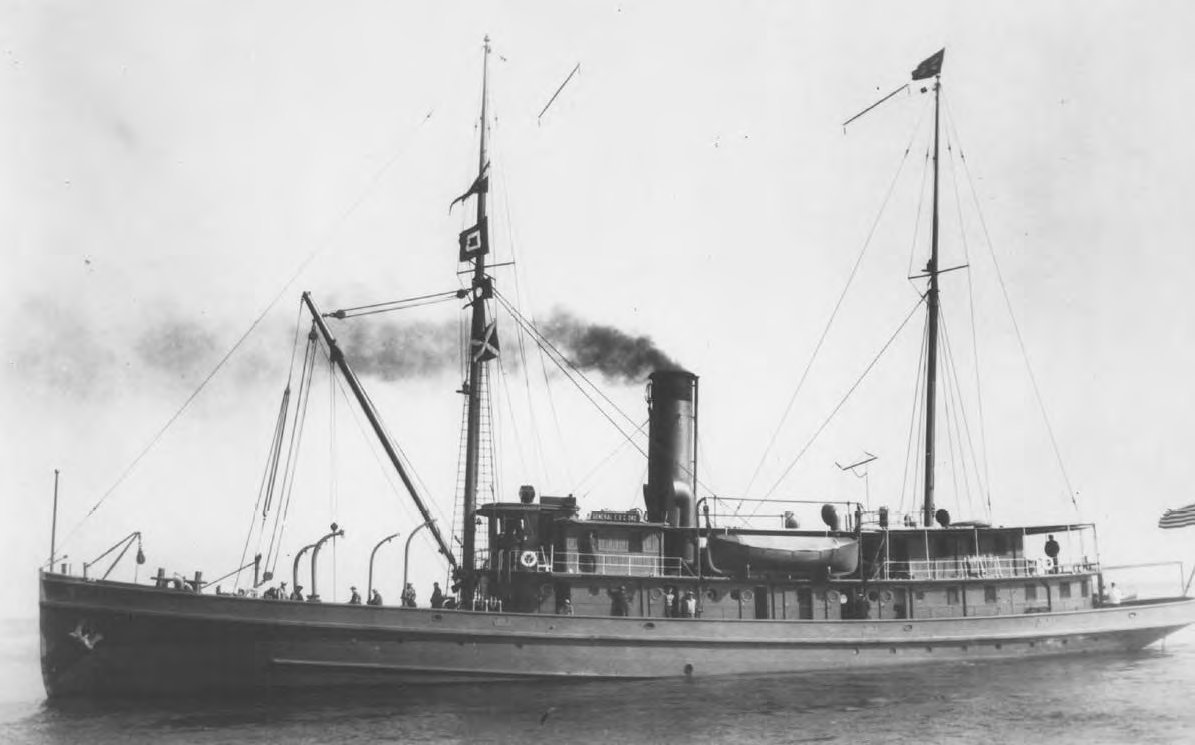
- USAMP General E. O. C. Ord

History

United States Army
- Name: USAMP General E. O. C. Ord
- Builder: Pusey & Jones Company
- Launched: 13 February 1909
- Acquired: June 1909
- Fate: Sold 1947, scrapped 1948

General characteristics
- Tonnage: 590 gross, 401 net
- Displacement: 621 long tons (631 t)
- Length: 165 ft (50 m)
- Beam: 32 ft (9.8 m)
- Draft: 10 ft (3.0 m)
- Installed power: 2 steam engines, 345 indicated horsepower each
- Propulsion: 2 propellers

USAMP General E. O. C. Ord was a steel-hulled ship built for service in the U.S. Army as a mine planter. She was launched in February 1909 and served her entire career on the Atlantic coast of America.

She was decommissioned after World War II and sold in 1947. The ship was scrapped in 1948.

== Construction and characteristics ==
The acquisition of the Philippines and Hawaii in 1898 led the U.S. Army Coast Artillery Corps to consider how to defend America's Pacific territories. Part of its response was to send all four of its mine planters from the east coast of the United States to the Pacific in 1908. In February 1908, the Army Quartermaster Department, which was responsible for all shipbuilding for the Army, sought bids for a new mine planter to replace one of these ships in the Atlantic. When bids were opened in March they were found to be too high. New specifications sought new bids for up to four mine planters. On 25 June 1908, the new bids were opened and New York Shipbuilding Company's was the lowest at $164,777 for each vessel. Contracts for three ships were awarded to the firm. These became USAMP General Samuel M. Mills (Contract 75), USAMP General John M. Schofield (Contract 76), and USAMP General Royal T. Frank (Contract 77). A contract for a fourth vessel was awarded to Pusey & Jones Company of Wilmington, Delaware. This became USAMP General E. O. C. Ord.

General E. O. C. Ord was launched on 13 February 1909 and christened by Miss Sara Mendinhall, daughter of John M. Mendinhall, the president of Pusey & Jones and Delaware's Lieutenant Governor. She had her first sea trial on 18 June 1909 and was accepted by the Army later that month.

The ship's hull and deck house was built of steel plates riveted together. She was 165 ft (50 m) long overall with a beam of 32 feet (9.8 m). Her depth of hold was 17 feet (5.2 m) Her gross register tonnage was 590 and her net register tonnage was 401. Her displacement was 621 tons.

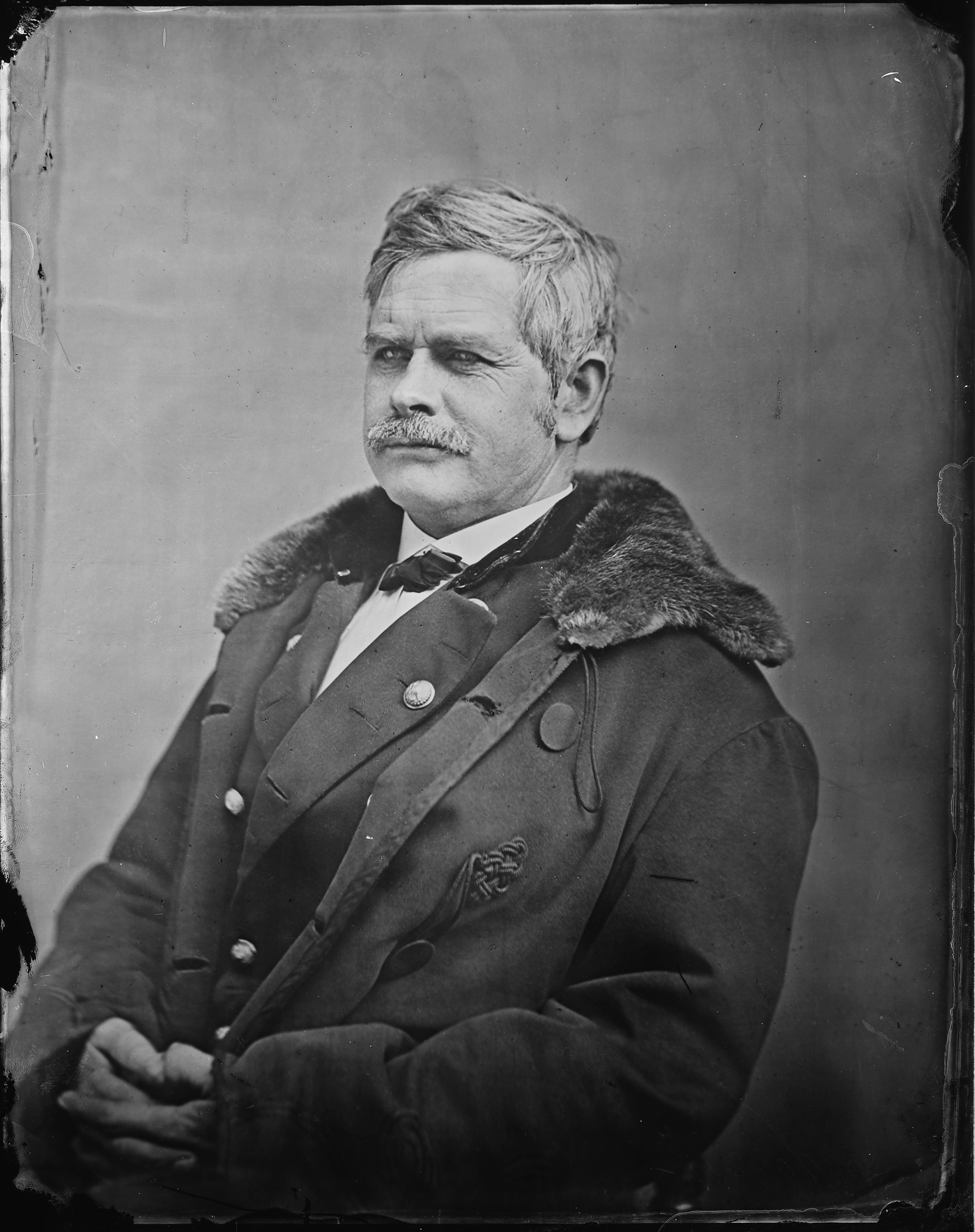
Major General Edward Ord, the ship's namesake

The ship had two 4-bladed propellers which were 8 feet (2.4 m) in diameter. They were driven by two compound, reciprocating steam engines, each of which generated 345 indicated horsepower. The engines' high pressure cylinders were 17.5 inches in diameter, and their low pressure cylinders were 35.5 inches in diameter, with a stroke of 22 inches. Steam was provided by two coal-fired boilers. During her builders' trials she attained a speed just over 15 statute miles per hour.

Electricity aboard was provided by a 20-kilowatt steam-powered General Electric generator.

By 1914 General Ord was equipped with a 1-kilowatt wireless telegraph station. She was assigned the call sign WYF. The ship also had submarine signal receiving equipment aboard, which was likely removed in 1920.

The ship's namesake was Major General Edward O. C. Ord, an Army corps commander during the Civil War.

== US Army service (1909–1946) ==
As one of the few mine planters on the east and Gulf coasts of America, the General Ord traveled widely installing, maintaining, and inspecting minefields protecting major ports. She also trained soldiers across the country in mine warfare.

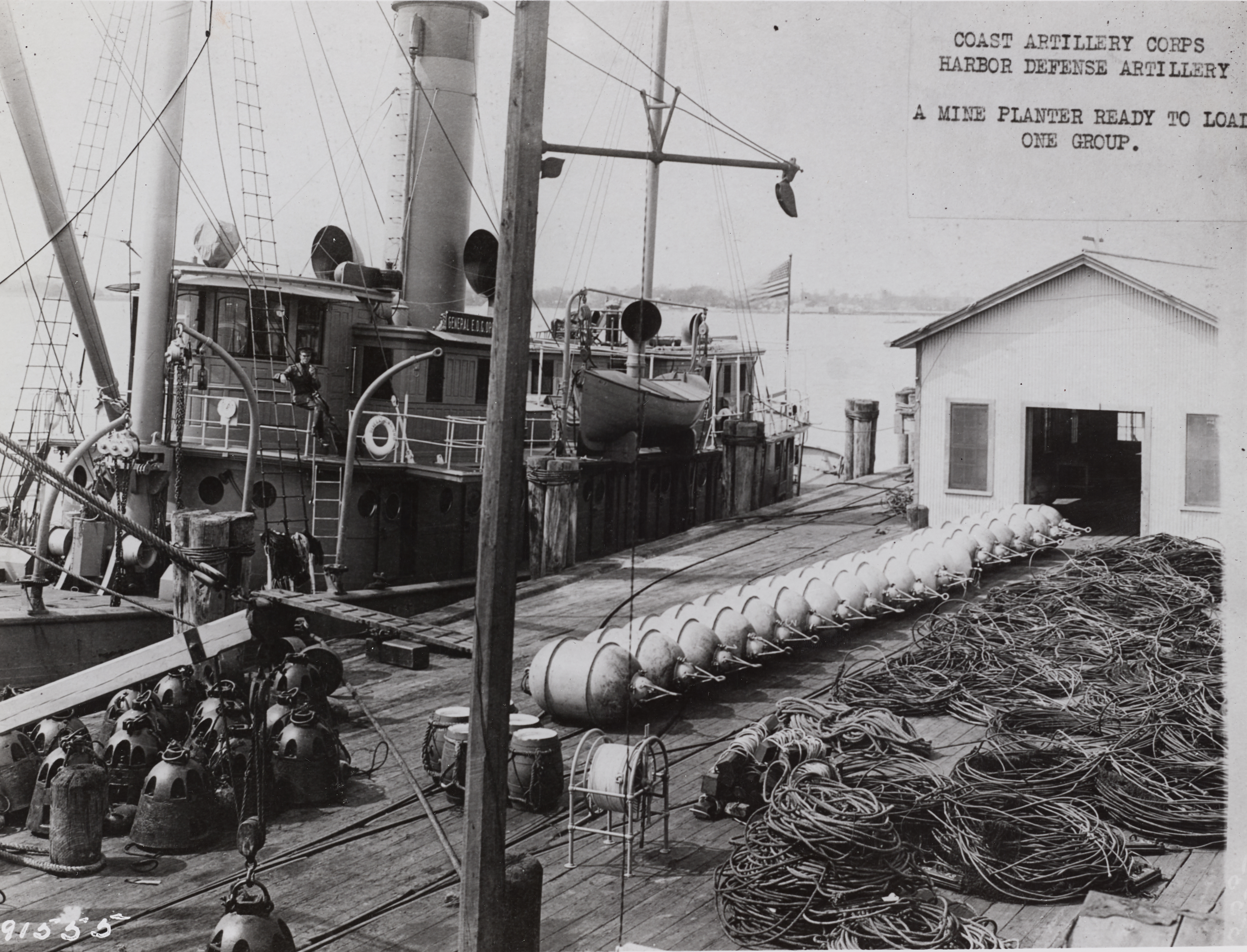
USAMP General E. O. C. Ord loading mines

The ship was originally stationed in New York. In 1913, she was reassigned to Fort Monroe, replacing USAMP General Samuel M. Mills. In 1919 her station was changed to Fort Totten, New York, then in 1922 the Army Supply Base in Brooklyn, New York, and finally Fort Hancock, New Jersey in 1941.

In 1919 General Ord hosted an extended training cruise for 20 soldiers at the Army's artillery school at Fort Monroe. The cruise touched at Savannah, Key West, Havana, and Charleston.

The Army's mine planters were commanded by Coast Artillery Corps officers, but crewed by civilians until 1918 when Congress established the Army Mine Planter Service. In August 1913 six of the civilian crew of General Ord went on strike to protest nighttime searchlight drills which disturbed their sleep.

General E. O. C. Ord suffered a number of accidents during her career. The ship collided with the tanker George W. Barnes in 1924. In 1932, while trying to avoid other ship traffic in the East River, General Ord hit a dock causing $1,097 in damage.

== Sale and scrapping ==
In the general demobilization at the end of World War II, General Ord was declared surplus. She was moored at the time at Staten Island. The United States Maritime Commission advertised the ship for sale. Bids were due 10 January 1947. She was sold and reported scrapped in 1948.

== See also ==
A collection of photographs of General E. O. C. Ord under construction at the Pusey & Jones shipyard is available here.
