= Arthur Murray (disambiguation) =

Arthur Murray (1895–1991) was a dance instructor and businessman.

Arthur Murray may also refer to:

- Arthur Murray (fencer), British Olympic fencer
- Arthur Murray (footballer) (1880–1930), Scottish footballer and teacher
- Arthur Murray, 3rd Viscount Elibank (1879–1962), Liberal member of the British Parliament
- Arthur W. Murray (1918–2011), United States test pilot
- Arthur Murray (general) (1851–1925), major general in the United States Army
- USAMP Maj. Gen. Arthur Murray, a mine planter ship later renamed as the USS Trapper (ACM-9)
- The Arthur Murray Party, an American television variety show, 1950–1960
