= Samuel Meyers Mills Jr. =

United States Army general

- Born: December 15, 1842; Pottersville, Pennsylvania
- Died: September 8, 1907 (aged 64); Cottage City, Prince George's County, Maryland
- Military career
- Branch: United States Army
- Rank: Brigadier General
- Commands: Chief of Artillery

Brigadier General Samuel Myers Mills Jr., (born December 15, 1842, in Pottersville, Pennsylvania, and died September 8, 1907, in Cottage City, Prince George's County, Maryland) served as the United States Army's chief of artillery from 1905 to 1906. He was the great-grandson of William Mills, a soldier in the American Revolution who enlisted in January 1776 and served seven years in Captain Caleb North's Company under Colonel Anthony Wayne. He was Chief of Artillery from 20 June 1905 until 2 October 1906.

The fortification on Corregidor Island, the Philippines, was designated a United States Military Reservation in 1907 and named Fort Mills in Brigadier General Mills's honor. Fort Mills, nicknamed "The Rock", was twice the site of heavy fighting during World War II, initially as the site of the Allies' last defense of the Philippines on May 2, 1942, after their defeat at Bataan, and subsequently during the Allied liberation of the Philippines under Gen. Douglas MacArthur in February 1945.

In Mills's honor, the USAMP General Samuel M. Mills, a U.S. Army mine planter ship, was built in 1908–09 by the New York Shipbuilding Company of Camden, New Jersey, for the Submarine Mine Service of the United States Army Coast Artillery Corps, a division of the United States Army, Office of the Quartermaster General. After being retrofitted as a cable ship, she was renamed the USCGC Pequot and during World War II laid cable along the eastern seaboard of the United States, bolstering US defenses.
