= Mine Planter Service =

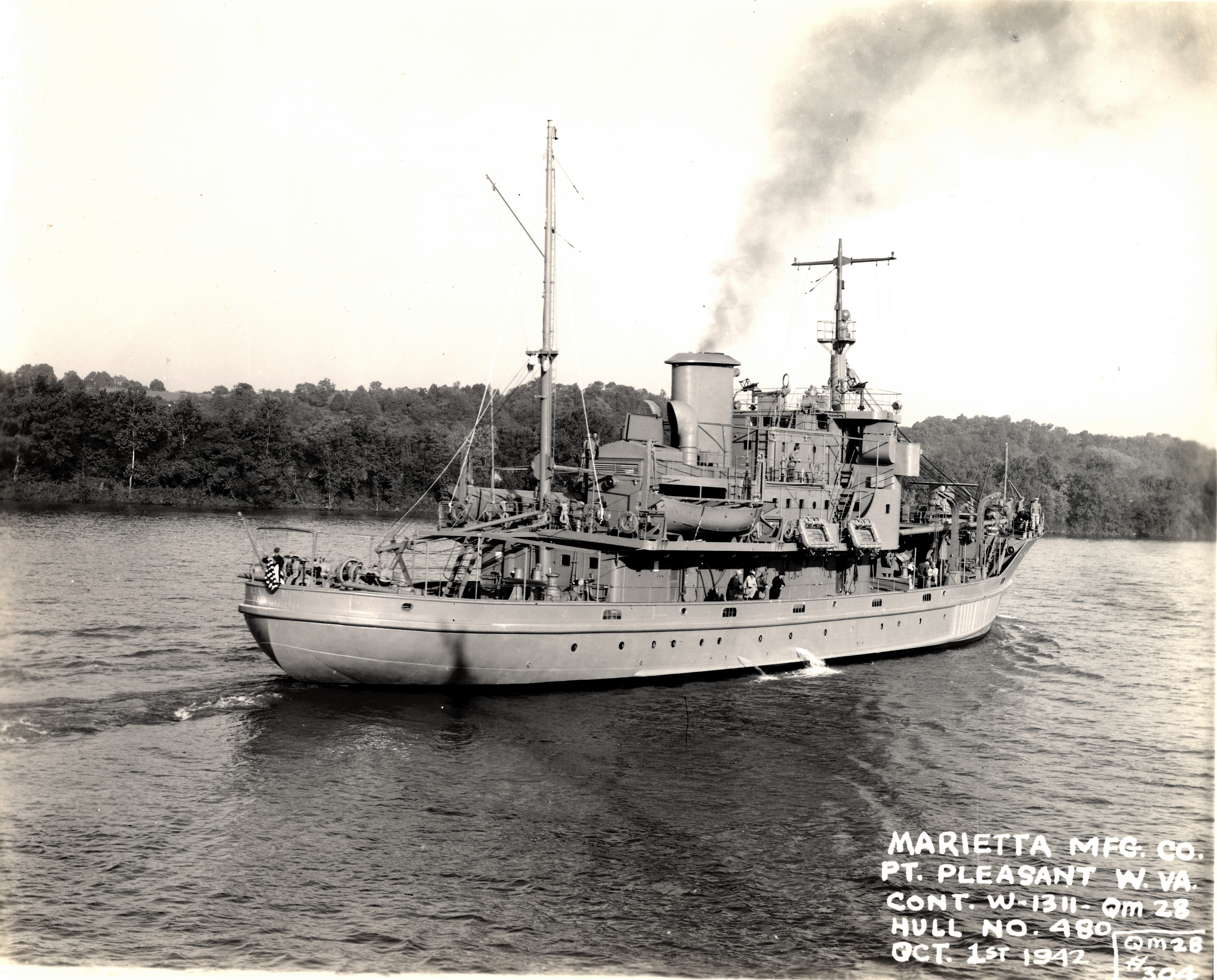
- USAMP MP-7 Major General Wallace F. Randolph, Army M 1 Mine Planter Hull No. 480. Records (#742), Special Collections Department, J. Y. Joyner Library, East Carolina University, Greenville, North Carolina, USA.

The U.S. Army Mine Planter Service (AMPS) was an outgrowth of civilian crewed Army mine planter ships dating back to 1904. It was established on July 22, 1918 by War Department Bulletin 43 and placed the Mine Planter Service under the U.S. Army Coast Artillery Corps. Its purview was to install and maintain the underwater minefields that were part of the principal armament of U.S. coastal fortifications, including those at the approaches to the Panama Canal and the defenses of Manila Bay in the Philippines.

== Origin ==
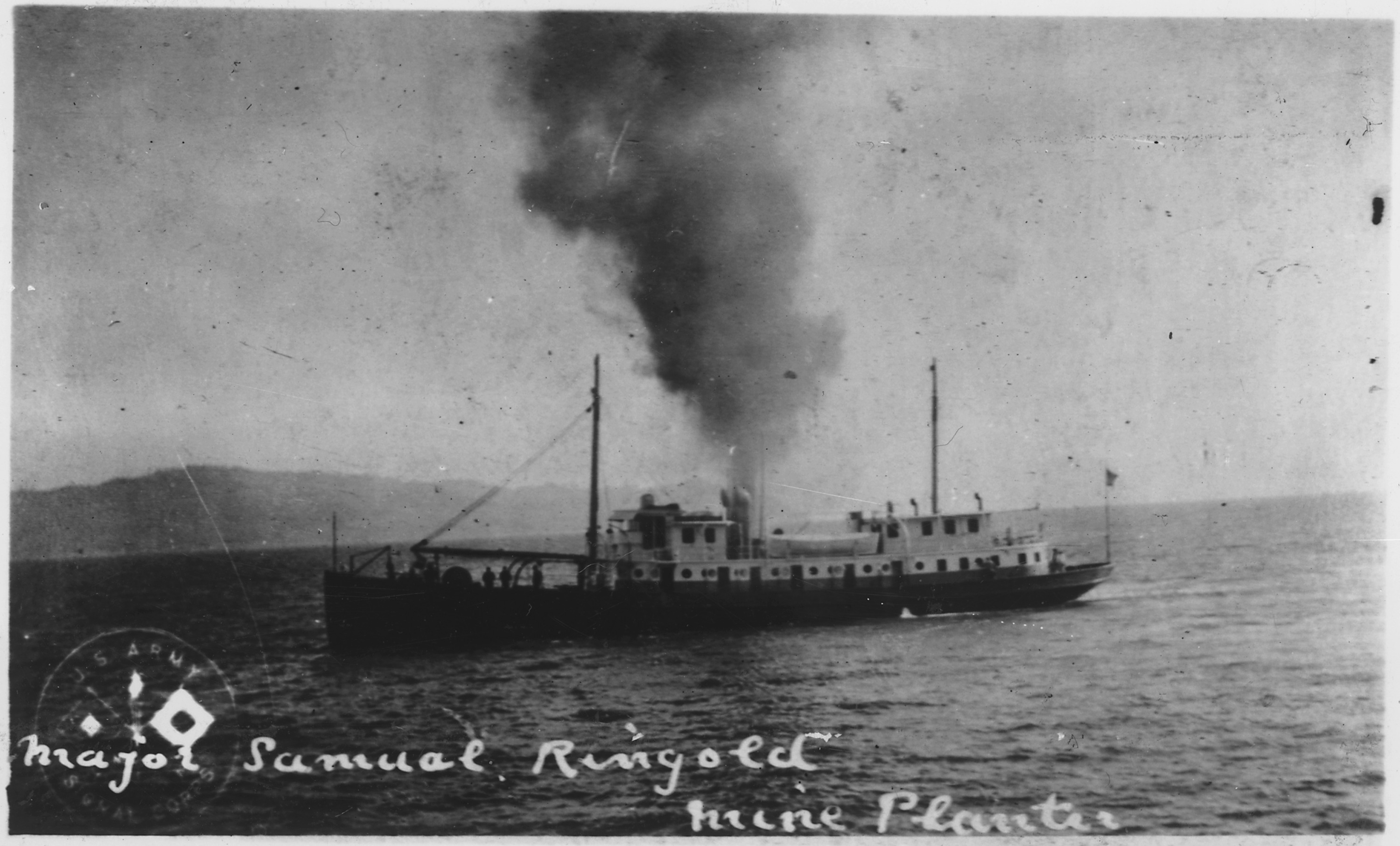
USAMP Major Samuel Ringgold, built in 1904. (National Archives and Records Administration)

Prior to the formal establishment of the Mine Planter Service, the Coast Artillery Corps had operated ships designated as Mine Planters, as well as an assortment of smaller vessels to establish and maintain the coastal defense mine fields. The ships, originating with vessels drafted into the work, were replaced by special construction in 1904 and 1909. Another block began with one ship, Gen. William M. Graham of 1917, and a group of nine constructed in 1919 to bring the fleet up to twenty planters in 1920. A massive Army reduction reduced that fleet to seven planters and one cable ship, named Joseph Henry. Many of those ships were transferred to the U.S. Lighthouse Service, later becoming U.S. Coast Guard vessels. No new ships were built until 1937 when one ship, the Lt. Col. Ellery W. Niles was delivered as the first diesel-electric ship in the service. No further vessels would be planned until the block of ships in progress when the U.S. entered World War II; these were delivered 1942–1943.

Ship's crews were originally civilian mariners, operating the ship under a Coast Artillery officer, who also commanded the embarked enlisted mine specialists. Friction had developed, in particular over civilian ship's officers and crews leaving to take other employment during operations. In 1916 the Chief of Coast Artillery recommended legislation militarizing these vessels. Two years later Congress granted the request.

== History ==
The Army Mine Planter Service was formally established by act of Congress on 7 July 1918 as a part of the Coast Artillery Corps. By the same act the grade of Army Warrant Officer was established to provide officers as masters, mates, chief engineers, and assistant engineers for the larger mine planting vessels, the Army Mine Planter (AMP). Mine Planter Service ship's officers wore distinctive sleeve insignia stripes similar to maritime and naval ships' officers, with deck officers indicated by an anchor and engineering officers by a propeller. With the formal establishment of the AMPS and the Warrant Officer grades to provide officers for the ships the service became an entirely military operation.

The larger vessels, designated U.S. Army Mine Planter (USAMP), were supported by a variety of smaller craft comprising a submarine mine flotilla to plant and maintain the mine fields associated with Army coast defense commands and their subordinate coastal fortifications of the United States. The smaller vessels included slightly smaller Junior Mine Planters, Distribution Box Boats, mine yawls and assorted other small craft.

The mine fields were composed of both contact mines, similar to conventional naval mines exploded by contact with a vessel, and controlled mines such as the M4 Ground Mine with a 3,000 pound TNT charge. The contact mines were placed in areas vessels were not to enter, and the controlled mines were placed in designated ship channels. Those mines were planted in planned groups at predetermined locations, connected to shore by electrical cables for firing when a target was observed within their effective range. The mines could be fired individually or as a group. The Distribution Box Boats were specially equipped to maintain the distribution boxes that joined the individual mines within a mine group to the main cable connecting the group to the mine casemate.

Early mine planters of the AMPS were capable of planting the mines, but did not have specific cable-laying or maintenance capability. Two Signal Corps vessels with that capability were used and eventually taken into service for that function. Studies of those capabilities led to an increased cable capability in a ship constructed in 1917 and the later ships constructed in 1919. At least one of those vessels went on to further cable work after disposal by Army. Full mine and cable capability was integrated in the single new ship built in 1937, the Lt. Col. Ellery W. Niles. At the entry of the United States into World War II sixteen new Army Mine Planter vessels were either under construction or planned. All had dual capability and several, including the Niles, went on to operate as small cable ships after Army service.

On 16 May 1921 SGT Benjamin Lee Woodhouse (1893-1921) died of wounds received in an explosion on Junior Mine Planter 46 in the New York Harbor area. He was married two days prior to the explosion. He was a cousin of Carol Ryrie Brink, author of Caddie Woodlawn and numerous other works.

World War II quickly demonstrated the obsolete nature of the static coastal defenses of which the mine fields were considered part of the principal armament. By the end of the war the forts were standing down and the Navy had been given responsibility for all mine operations. Many of the 1942 and 1943 construction vessels were transferred to the Navy to be converted to Auxiliary Minelayers (ACM), where they were armed and modified for mine operations more in the nature of the naval mine warfare model. The ships' mine planting capability was similar to buoy tender capability, and that was included in the naval mission and later U.S. Coast Guard service.

The Mine Planter Service faced major change during and at the end of the war, with its ships and role in mining transferred to the Navy. The Coast Artillery Journal for March–April 1948 noted joint training with Navy and how USAMP Spurgin was serving as a "floating laboratory" with "as many Navy hands as soldiers aboard the Spurgin as she works in the San Francisco harbor entrance". The Army Mine Planter Service was officially terminated by the 1954 Warrant Officer Personnel Act.

== Insignia ==
The following Warrant Officer insignia were described (but not authorized) by War Department Circular 15 on January 17, 1920. The insignia were repealed when the Mine Planter Service was abolished on June 30, 1947. The ranks themselves were still on the books until abolished in 1954. Each Mine Planter had to have a complement of three Deck Officers (one Master, one First Mate, and one Second Mate) and three Engineering Officers (one Chief Engineer, one Assistant Engineer, and one Second Assistant Engineer) onboard serving in 8-hour shifts.

- Master: An embroidered 1-inch fouled anchor over 4 Bands of 1/2-inch brown braid.
- First Mate: An embroidered 1-inch fouled anchor over 3 Bands of 1/2-inch brown braid.
- Second Mate: An embroidered 1-inch fouled anchor over 2 Bands of 1/2-inch brown braid.
- Chief Engineer: An embroidered 1-inch three-vaned propeller over 4 Bands of 1/2-inch brown braid.
- Assistant Engineer: An embroidered 1-inch three-vaned propeller over 3 Bands of 1/2-inch brown braid.
- Second Assistant Engineer: An embroidered 1-inch three-vaned propeller over 2 Bands of 1/2-inch brown braid.

== ex-Mine Planters in U.S. Naval service and U.S. Coast Guard service ==
The mine planters turned over to the U.S. Navy were the core of the Auxiliary Minelayer (ACM / MMA) group of the Chimo and Camanche classes. A number of the Army mine planters also became U.S. Coast Guard vessels. Six of the early mine planters became Coast Guard ships through the United States Lighthouse Service as the Speedwell class lighthouse tenders and buoy tenders in 1921–1927. The 1909 General Samuel M. Mills became the Coast Guard cable ship USCGC Pequot (WARC 58). The more recent vessels were taken into Coast Guard service after their naval service. One of the 1942 mine planters, USAMP Major General Arthur Murray (MP-9), became the Navy's USS Trapper (ACM-9), then transferred to the Coast Guard and was renamed as USCGC Yamacraw (WARC-333), and then returned to the Navy as the cable repair ship USS Yamacraw (ARC-5) serving until 1965.

== See also ==
- List of ships of the United States Army § Mine Planters
- Submarine mines in United States harbor defense
- Seacoast defense in the United States
- Harbor Defense Command
