= USAMP Colonel George F. E. Harrison =

US Army mine planter

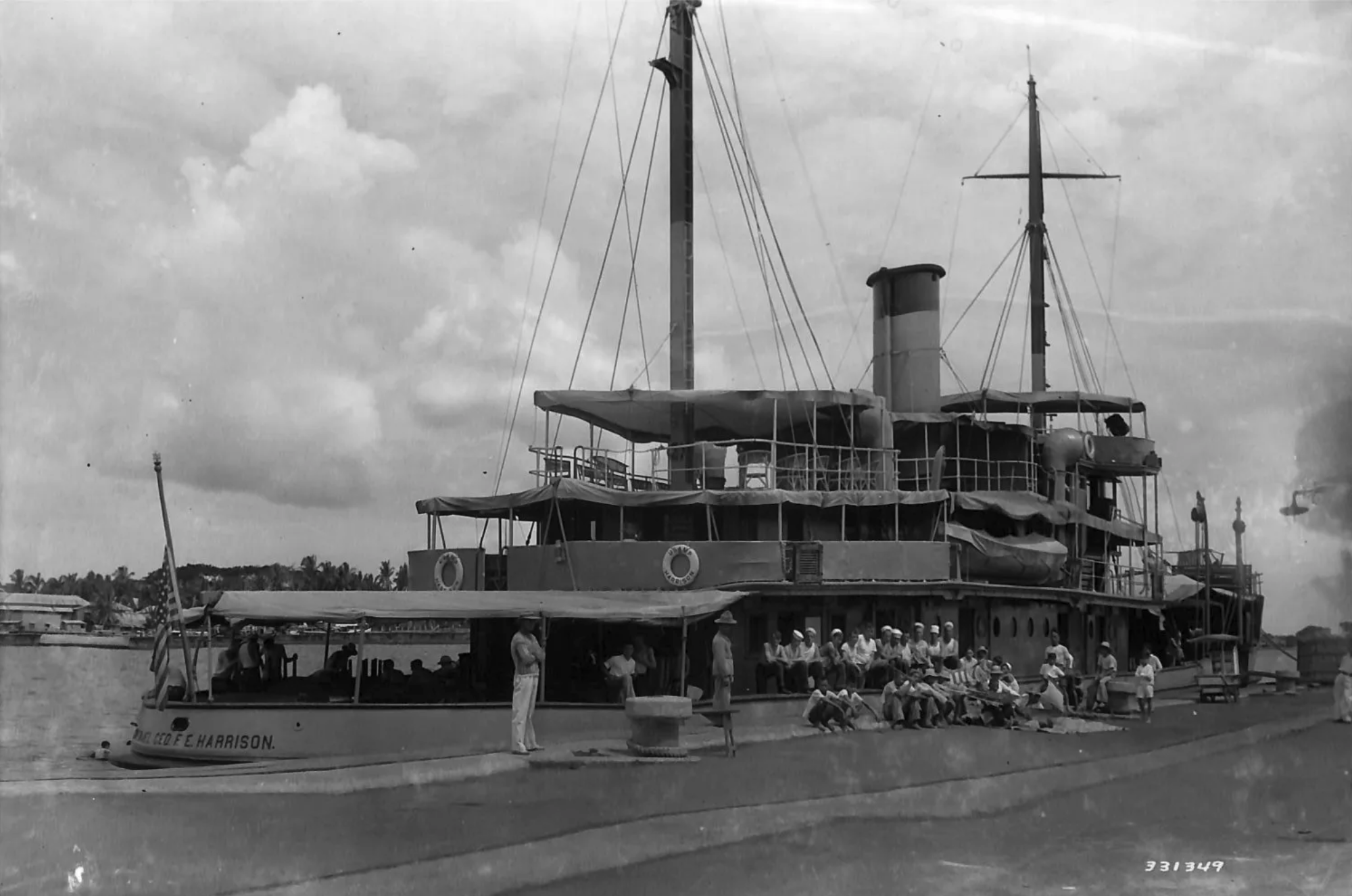
- USAMP Colonel George F. E. Harrison

History

United States Army
- Name: USAMP Colonel George F. E. Harrison
- Builder: Fabricated Ship Corporation
- Launched: 1920
- Fate: Sunk by Japanese aircraft 5 May 1942 at Corregidor

Imperial Japanese Navy
- Name: Harushima
- Acquired: Raised and repaired July 1942
- Fate: Sunk by American aircraft 18 July 1945 at Yokosuka Navy Base

General characteristics
- Displacement: 1,130 long tons (1,150 t)
- Length: 172 ft 6 in (52.58 m)
- Beam: 32 ft (9.8 m)
- Draft: 11 ft 6 in (3.51 m)
- Installed power: 2 steam engines, 1,040 horsepower
- Propulsion: 2 propellers

USAMP Colonel George F. E. Harrison was a steel-hulled ship built for service in the U.S. Army as a mine planter. She was launched in 1920. The ship served in the defense of the Canal Zone and Manila. She was present in Manila Bay on 7 December 1941 when hostilities began between the United States and Japan in World War II. She earned a Presidential Unit Citation for her part in the defense of Manila and Subic Bay, but was sunk by Japanese dive bombers in early May 1942.

The Japanese raised and repaired the ship. She was commissioned in the Imperial Japanese Navy as IJN Harushima. She laid electrical cable off Honshu, escorted convoys, and made anti-submarine patrols in 1944. In July 1945 she was sunk by U.S. Navy aircraft at the Yokosuka Navy base near Tokyo.

== Construction and characteristics ==
In early July 1918 the Newton Engineering Company and Coddington Engineering Company, both of Milwaukee, Wisconsin, were awarded a contract for nine mine planters as joint contractors. Upon the award of the contract, Newton Engineering purchased all the assets of Coddington Engineering and changed its name to Fabricated Ship Corporation. Thus the nine ships, including Colonel George F. E. Harrison, were built by Fabricated Ship. On the U.S. government side, the contract was executed by the US Army Quartermaster Corps, which was responsible for all Army shipbuilding, for eventual use by the Army Coast Artillery Corps.

The ship's hull and superstructure was built of steel plates riveted together. She was 172 ft 6 in (52.58 m) long overall, and 159 feet 6 inches (48.62 m) long on her waterline. She had a beam of 32 feet (9.8 m). Her light draft was 9 feet (2.7 m), and her maximum draft was 11 feet 6 inches (3.51 m). The ship's maximum displacement was 1,130 tons. Her gross register tons was 704 and her net register tons was 138.

The ship had two propellers which were driven by two Allis Chalmers compound, inverted, reciprocating steam engines. The indicated horsepower of these engines was 1,040. Steam for the engines was produced by two oil-fired boilers. Her maximum speed was 11 knots. Harrison's derrick was capable of raising a 15-ton load.

Colonel George F. E. Harrison was one of the last two of the nine mine planters completed by Fabricated Ship. She was accepted by the Army on 30 November 1920.

The ship's namesake was Colonel George Francis Edward Harrison, of the US Army's Coast Artillery Corps. Harrison's final post was commander of Fort Monroe and the Army's Coast Artillery school.

== US Army service (1920–1942) ==
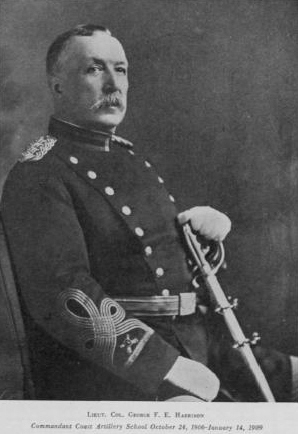
George F. E. Harrison, the ship's namesake

Colonel George F. E. Harrison sailed from Milwaukee on 2 November 1920. During the voyage she put into Manitowoc when USAMP Colonel John V. White, a sister ship with which she was traveling, broke down and was towed into port. Harrison made fuel stops at Sarnia, Montreal, and Halifax. She reached Army Supply Base Brooklyn on 26 November 1920. Her first task ws to have her radio equipment installed at the Army Marine Repair Shop in Hoboken, New Jersey. She was assigned call sign WYBE.

Harrison remained in Brooklyn until 19 October 1921 when she departed for service in the Canal Zone. She arrived at Fort Sherman on 7 November 1921 after stops in Charleston, South Carolina and Cienfuegos, Cuba.

=== Canal Zone (1921–1922) ===
Harrison was assigned to the Panama Coast Artillery District, headquartered at Fort Sherman, in defense of Balboa and the Panama Canal.

On 9 August 1922 the ship was ordered to a new assignment at Manila. In September 1922 Harrison underwent a significant maintenance period in Balboa before heading across the Pacific to the Philippines. The ship departed Fort Sherman on 24 September 1922, and arrived at Manila on 11 March 1923 with stops in Manzanillo, Mexico, San Francisco, and Honolulu.

=== Manila (1923–1942) ===
Harrison was assigned to the coast defense of Manila and Subic Bay. She replaced USAMP General Henry J. Hunt which was sold. Hunt's crew was transferred to Harrison in 1923.

Harrison's primary mission was to set and maintain electrically-fired mines in the approaches to Manila Bay and Subic Bay. She was also used for a variety of routine trips in Manila Bay, around the Philippines, and around the region. For example, in October 1926, she carried an inspection party led by General Fred Sladen, commander of the Army Department of the Philippines, to Manila's leper colony. On 14 February 1930 she towed targets for a live fire exercise of guns on Corregidor. She transported arriving personnel to Corregidor, including General Walter K. Wilson, the new commander of the harbor defenses, in 1938. Generals Lucius Holbrook, and John L. DeWitt went aboard Harrison for an inspection tour which stopped at Cullon, Puerto Princessa, Pettit Barracks in Zamboanga, and Jolo. Major General James H. McRae sailed to Sandakan, Borneo to visit with British officials in 1925.

On 21 November 1935 her station was changed from Manila to Fort Mills on Corregidor.

==== World War II ====
In July and August, 1941 Harrison set the entrance and exit minefields in Manila Bay. The ship was armed with two .30 caliber machine guns, and two .50 caliber machine guns to defend against air attack. She was in Manila on 7 December 1941 when Japan attacked the United States.

Once the conflict began, Harrison was generally responsible for maintaining the north channel through the minefield while U.S. Navy ships maintained the south channel, but under the pressure of war she did whatever job was required. She maintained mines throughout the area, ran communication cables to Corregidor, and transferred personnel, fresh water, and supplies to installations around the bay. In April 1942, after the fall of Bataan, Harrison rescued about fifty men who were attempting to swim to Corregidor.

Fuel was in short supply in Manila after hostilities commenced, and the Japanese blockade made resupply impossible. By February 1942, Harrison's operations were curtailed by lack of fuel. Her crew searched the ships which were sunk by the Japanese and found fuel aboard the wreck of S.S. San Jose. They were able to refuel Harrison and several other ships to recommence their operations.

By the beginning of May Harrison was out of fuel again. A skeleton crew of four men was kept aboard while the rest of the crew were sent to gun positions to defend Corregidor. On 3 May 1942, the ship was attacked by Japanese dive bombers and was hit twice. Her starboard superstructure was destroyed and damage was done belowdeck as well. Four men aboard at the time were killed. On 4 or 5 May 1942 Harrison was attacked again and partially sunk by Japanese dive bombers in South Bay on Corregidor.

On 30 April 1942 USAMP Colonel George F. E. Harrison and other units of the Harbor Defenses of Manila and Subic Bays were awarded the Presidential Unit Citation for their efforts.

== Imperial Japanese Navy service (1942–1945) ==
Sometime between the surrender of Corregidor in May 1942 and July 1942, Harrison was raised by the Japanese and towed to the shipyard in Cavite. On 15 July 1942 she was renamed Harushima and classified as a cable ship. This was a function for which the ship was better prepared for than most; the Army's electrically-fired sea mines were controlled by miles-long cables laid by mine planters such as Harrison. Harushima laid electrical cables along the Japanese coast in 1944. The ship also escorted convoys and was used in anti-submarine patrols in 1944.

Harushima was strafed and briefly set afire by a P-51 Mustang near Tokyo on 19 April 1945. On 18 July 1945 Grumman TBF Avengers and F6F Hellcats from Task Force 38 attacked the Japanese Yokosuka Naval Base near Tokyo. Harushima was moored next to the battleship Nagato which was a primary target of the attack. The battleship survived the attack, but Harushima took a direct hit, broke in two and sank.
