= USS J. A. Palmer =

Patrol vessel of the United States Navy

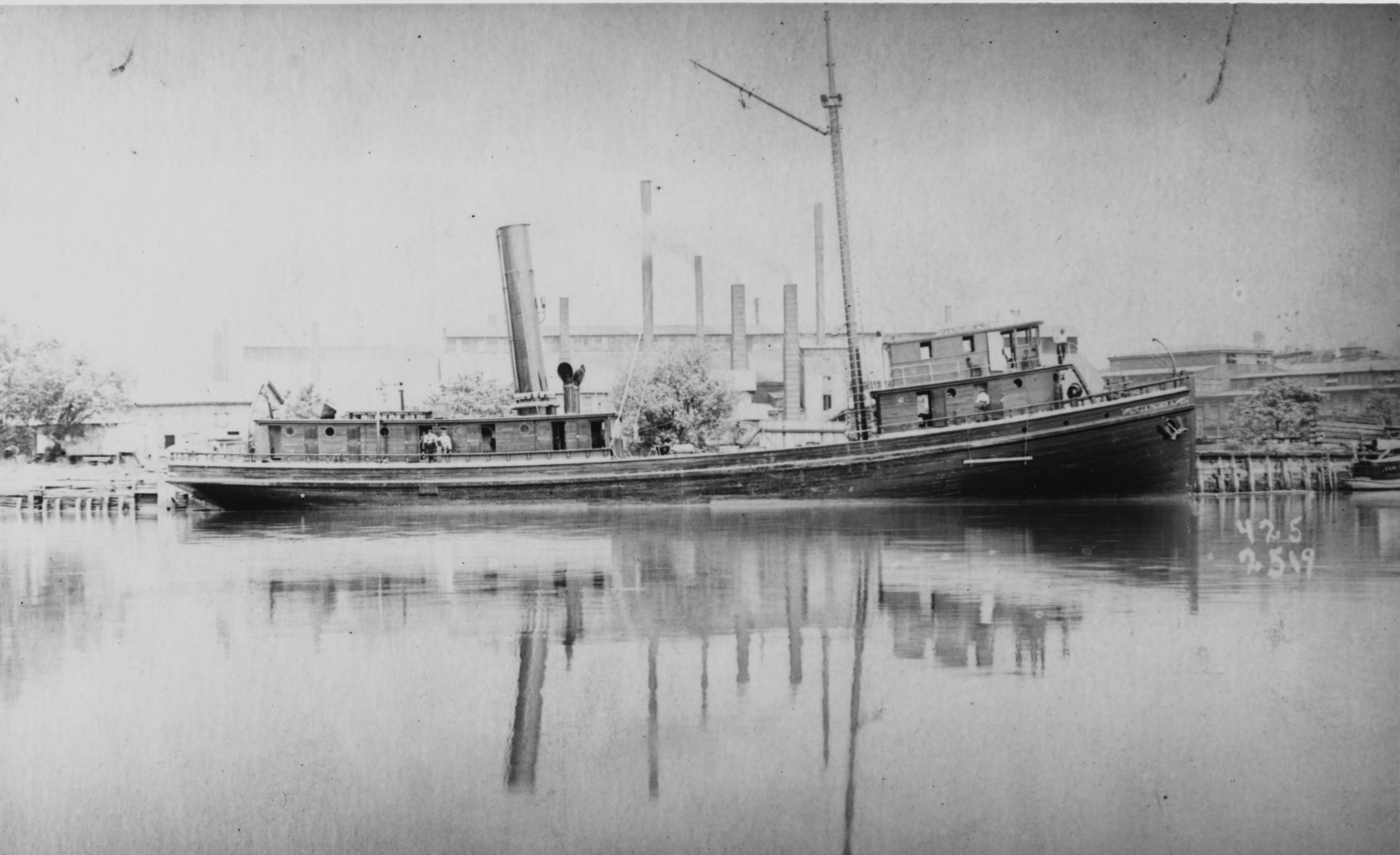
- J. A. Palmer Jr., circa 1912

History

United States
- Name: USS J. A. Palmer (1917-1919); USS SP-319 (1919)
- Namesake: J. A. Palmer was her previous name retained; SP-319 was her section patrol number
- Builder: Jackson and Sharp Company, Wilmington, Delaware
- Launched: 1911
- Completed: 1912
- Acquired: 7 April 1917
- Commissioned: 7 April 1917
- Renamed: USS SP-319 17 January 1919
- Fate: Transferred to United States Coast Guard 10 September 1919
- Notes: Operated as commercial fishing vessel J. A. Palmer 1912-1917 and as U.S. Coast Guard cable ship USCGC Pequot (1919) 1919-1922

General characteristics
- Type: Patrol vessel
- Tonnage: 276 tons
- Length: 155 ft (47 m)
- Beam: 22 ft (6.7 m)
- Draft: 12 ft (3.7 m)
- Propulsion: One compound-expansion steam engine, one shaft
- Speed: 12 knots
- Armament: 2 × 1-pounder guns
- Notes: Call sign GSRJ

USS J. A. Palmer (SP-319), later USS SP-319, was a United States Navy patrol vessel in commission between 1917 and 1919. The vessel was later USCGC Pequot in U.S. Coast Guard service.

== U.S. Navy service ==
J. A. Palmer was built as a wooden commercial fishing vessel of the same name in 1912 by the Jackson and Sharp Company at Wilmington, Delaware. The U.S. Navy acquired her from her owners, the C. E. Davis Packing Company of Reedville, Virginia, on 7 April 1917 for World War I service as a patrol vessel. She was commissioned the same day as USS J. A. Palmer (SP-319).

Assigned to the 5th Naval District, J. A. Palmer operated on section patrol duty off Cape Henry, Virginia, until February 1918, when she received special cable equipment at Berkeley, Virginia. She then was loaned to the United States Coast Guard for use as a cable ship and steamed along the United States East Coast laying and repairing cable.

To avoid confusion with the destroyer USS Palmer (DD-161), J. A. Palmer's name was dropped on 17 January 1919, and she became USS SP-319 as of that date.

== U.S. Coast Guard service ==
J.A. Palmer was loaned to the Coast Guard in February 1918 and redesignated by the Navy as USS SP-319, 17 January 1919.

USS SP-319 was transferred permanently to the Coast Guard and commissioned on 10 September 1919 for continued use as a cable ship. She served in the Coast Guard as USCGC Pequot (1919) until 1922. She was the first of two Coast Guard cutters named Pequot. During her Coast Guard service Pequot laid cable, primarily on the east coast.

On 28 April 1922 Pequot towed her replacement vessel, the former U.S.Army mine planter USAMP General Samuel M. Mills; which was to become the second USCGC Pequot (WARC-58) (1922) from Newport News, Virginia to the depot at the United States Coast Guard Yard, Curtis Bay, Maryland.

Pequot was decommissioned on 11 May 1922 and was sold on 8 August 1922 to McNeal Edwards Company, of Reedville, Virginia for $17,000.
