= Submarine mines in United States harbor defense =

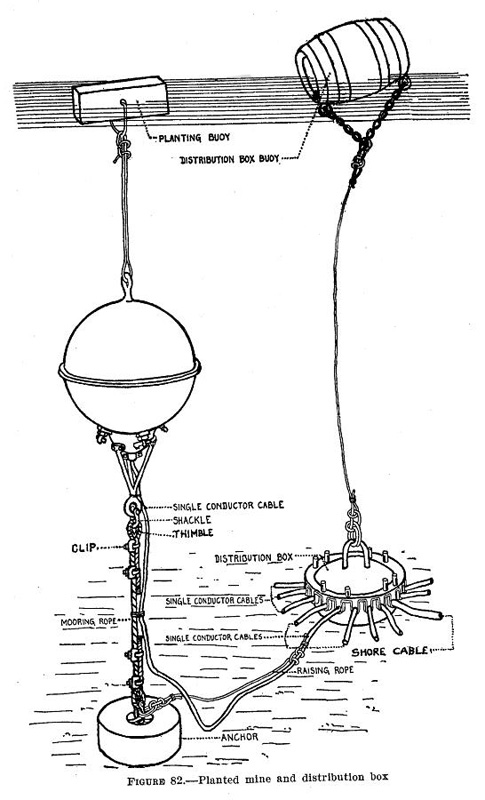
A controlled mine (at left), with the distribution box that connected it and the other mines in its group to the mine casemate on shore.

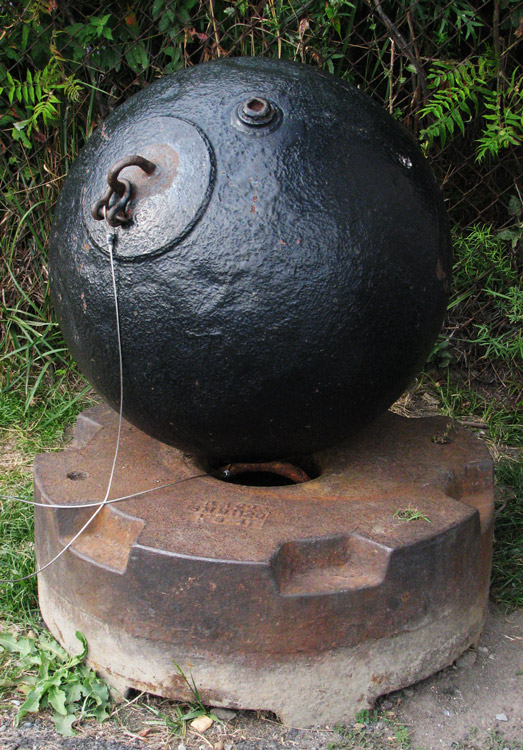
This WW2-era mine, with its anchor, is on display at Fort Warren in Boston Harbor.

The modern era of defending American harbors with controlled mines or submarine mines (originally referred to as "torpedoes") began in the post-Civil War period, and was a major part of US harbor defenses from circa 1900 to 1947.

== Brief history ==
In 1866, the United States Army Corps of Engineers established the Engineer School of Application at Willets Point, New York. The first commander of this school, Major Henry Larcom Abbot, was almost single-handedly responsible for designing and supervising the program of research and development that defined the strategy and tactics for the mine defense of American harbors. Abbot experimented with underwater explosives, fuzes, cabling, and electrical equipment for over a decade before publishing the first manuals on the use of mines in coast defense in 1876–77. At least one experimental controlled minefield was emplaced at this time, at Fort Mifflin in Pennsylvania. However, funding of the fortification program of the 1870s was cancelled in 1878.

In 1886 the Endicott Board made its report on harbor defense, with sweeping recommendations for new minefield and gun defenses. This initiated a vast expansion in the building of modern forts, the installation of new guns, and the preparation of mine defenses at newly created Artillery Districts, designated Coast Defense Commands in 1913, defending major seaports.

Mines were planted at 28 harbors during the Spanish–American War, and many lessons were learned. In 1901 the responsibility for underwater mines shifted from the Corps of Engineers to the Artillery Corps, and was a founding responsibility of the Coast Artillery Corps in 1907. In 1904 the first US Army mine planters were built, small vessels used to emplace and retrieve controlled mines. In July 1918, the U.S. Army Mine Planter Service (AMPS) was established to maintain U.S. mine defenses, replacing civilian manning of the mine planters.

From about 1900 until 1946 the mine defense program grew, until upwards of 10,000 controlled mines were maintained by the Coast Artillery Corps. In 1940 around 27 Harbor Defense Commands had minefields, including at least five overseas commands.

In 1943 the buoyant mines were replaced with ground mines, which rested on the seabed. This was due to the deployment of minefields in World War II, which resulted in deep-draft ships fouling the mine cables while passing through deactivated minefields.

== General system description ==
Controlled mines were anchored to the bottom of a harbor, either sitting on the bottom itself (ground mines) or floating (buoyant mines) at depths which could vary widely, from about 20 to 250 feet (6–75 m). These mines were fired electrically through a vast network of underwater electrical cables at each protected harbor. Mines could be set to explode on contact or be triggered by the operator, based on reports of the position of enemy ships. The networks of cables terminated on shore in massive concrete bunkers called mine casemates (see photo, below right), that were usually buried beneath protective coverings of earth.

The mine casemate housed electrical generators, batteries, control panels, and troops that were used to test the readiness of the mines and to fire them when needed. The map of Boston Harbor's mine fields (below right) shows the harbor mine defenses consisting of 30 groups of mines, with 19 mines per group. Each mine was normally loaded with 200 lb (91 kg) of TNT. In the case of Boston, a total of 57 tons of explosives guarded the harbor. As was the case with other parts of the U.S. coast defense system (e.g., its thousands of guns), there is no evidence that a mine was ever fired in anger against an attacking enemy, except in the Philippines in 1941-42. There is a report that a submarine attempted to penetrate the mine fields of Boston Harbor in June 1942, but reportedly withdrew before the mines could be fired or reset to detonate on contact.

Each protected harbor also maintained a small fleet of mine planters and tenders that were used to plant the mines in precise patterns, haul them back up periodically to check their condition (or to remove them back to the shore for maintenance), and then plant them again. Each of these harbors also had on-shore facilities to store the mines (called "torpedo storehouses") and the TNT used to fill them, rail systems to load and transport the mines (which often weighed over 750 lb (340 kg) each when loaded), and to test and repair the electrical cables. Fire control structures were also built that were used first to observe the mine-planting process and fix location of each mine and second to track attacking ships, reporting when specific mines should be detonated (known as "observed fire"). The preferred method of using the mines was to set them to detonate a set period of time after they had been touched or tipped, avoiding the need for observers to spot each target ship.

== Control ==
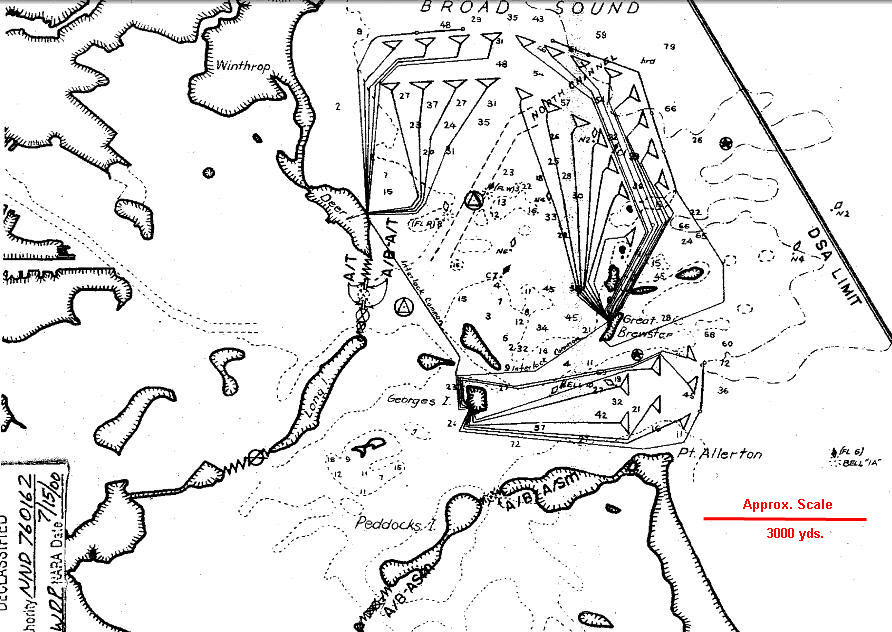
A 1945 map of the mine fields protecting Boston Harbor during World War II. About 570 mines are indicated on this map.

The mine casemate at Fort Strong, Long Island, Boston Harbor, once the control point for mines in the southern channels to the harbor.

Each mine casemate controlled about 150 to 300 mines (depending on the harbor defended), arranged in groups of 19. The mines in a group were generally laid about 100 ft (30 m) apart, in lines running across the channel being protected, with 50 ft (15 m) or less on either end of the line. This meant that one group of mines could protect a total distance of about 1,900 ft (580 m). About 3 miles (4.8 km) of cable were required to connect one group of 19 mines to its distribution box, with the connecting cables radiating out from the box in a hub-and-spoke fashion. Actually, the distribution box was usually located well behind the line of mines, so the pattern looked more like a 19-armed candelabrum with the box at its base. If more groups of mines were needed, multiple mine casemates were generally built and equipped. For example, Boston had three mine casemates, with two originally at Fort Dawes on Deer Island (northern channels) and Fort Strong on Long Island (southern channels). Later in World War II, Fort Strong's mine casemate was deactivated and control of the southern mines passed to Fort Warren on Georges Island.

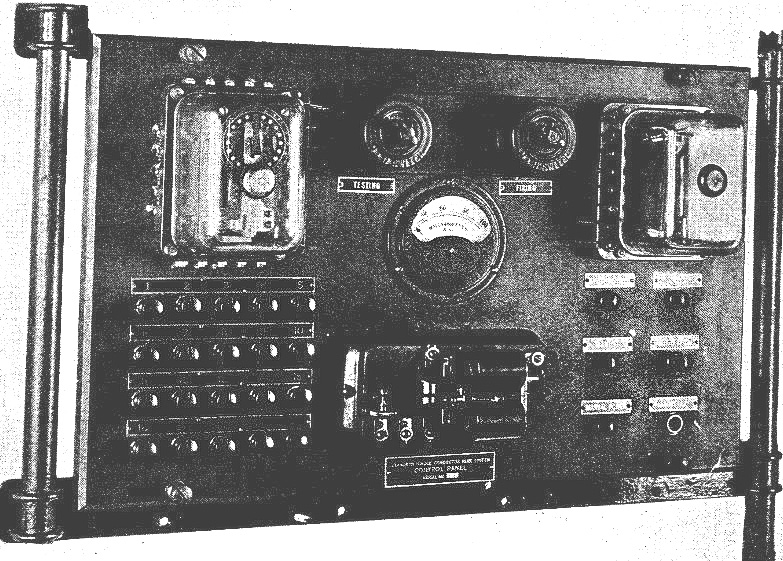
A mine casemate had a control panel like this for each 19-mine group under its command. The controls were used to test and to fire the mines.

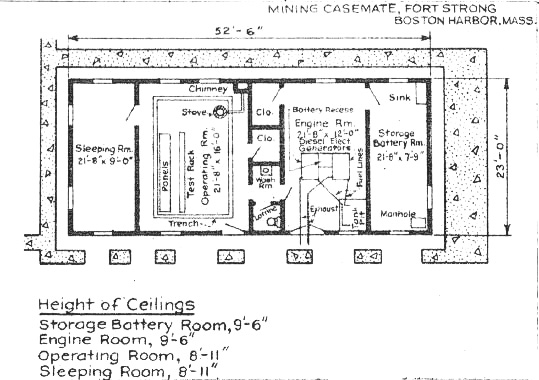
A 1940 plan of the mine casemate at Fort Strong, Long Island, Boston Harbor (same building as photo directly above).

The shore cable from the underwater distribution box of each mine group ran back to a cable hut on the shore near the mine casemate, and from there to the casemate itself, where it was connected to a mine control panel (see photo at left). These panels were located in the casemate's operating room, pictured at left-center in the plan shown at right. (This is the plan of the Ft. Strong mine casemate, the one shown in the photo directly above it.)

In addition to these firing controls, the mine casemate contained one or more electric generators and a large bank of electric storage batteries. The generators produced direct current, which was used to signal the readiness of the mines. An interrupter was used to convert a portion of this current to AC which was used to fire the mines; the distinct current supply was a safety feature. The casemate also had a number of telephone lines, keeping it in touch with remotely located mine observation and fire-control positions, with the mine commander, and with the gun batteries and searchlights that covered the mine fields. The casemate also contained switching and diagnostic equipment used to test cable integrity and the functionality of the individual and group mine detonation switches.

For example, as the largest mine casemate in Boston Harbor controlled 15 mine groups (285 mines), it would have mounted 15 of these mine control panels, plus many more related rack-mount devices for controlling the casemate's generators, inverters, and battery systems.

The mines could be fired in three ways, listed here in order of tactical preference:

1. Delayed Contact Fire: the mine was switched into contact firing status a certain number of seconds after it signaled it had been touched or tipped.
2. Contact Fire: the mine was set to explode as soon as it was touched or tipped.
3. Observation Fire: target was tracked, its position plotted by the mine fire control tower/s, and an appropriate mine in its path was fired at a time when the observers indicated the target was within the kill zone for that mine.

Delayed contact fire was preferred because minefield designers anticipated the mine would first be dragged underneath the target and then fired after a few seconds' delay, once it had had the chance to contact a more lightly protected portion of the target's bottom. This type of fire required the casemate troops to hear the bell and see the accompanying signal light that indicated when a given mine was tipped, wait several seconds, and then throw the firing switch for that mine's group into "fire" position to detonate the mine.

In contact fire mode, each mine in the group was set to explode when contacted or tipped by a ship; in observed fire mode, mines were fired in a fashion similar to that used under the fire control system for the coast artillery batteries defending the harbor: distant observers took bearings on targets though spotting telescopes, and these bearings were used to plot the target's position.

Minefield designers anticipated contact fire or delayed contact fire would be most useful in situations when more than one enemy ship was approaching the mine field, or was approaching quite rapidly, which made observed fire more difficult, or under conditions of poor visibility. On the other hand, these types of fire made it much more dangerous for any friendly shipping that might be near the mine field.

== Maintenance ==
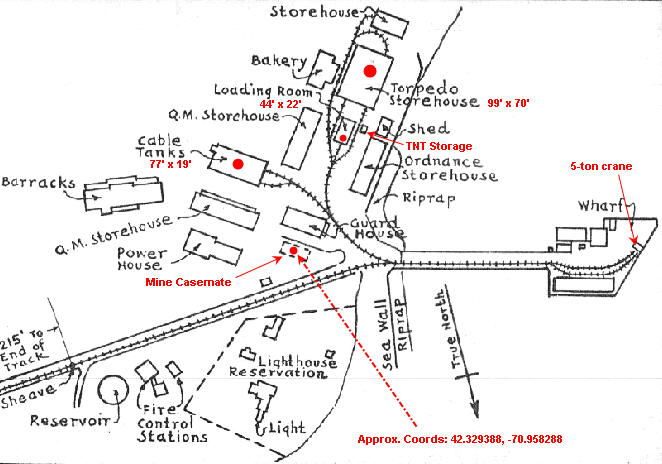
A 1921 map of the mine-handling facilities at Fort Strong, Long Island, Boston Harbor.

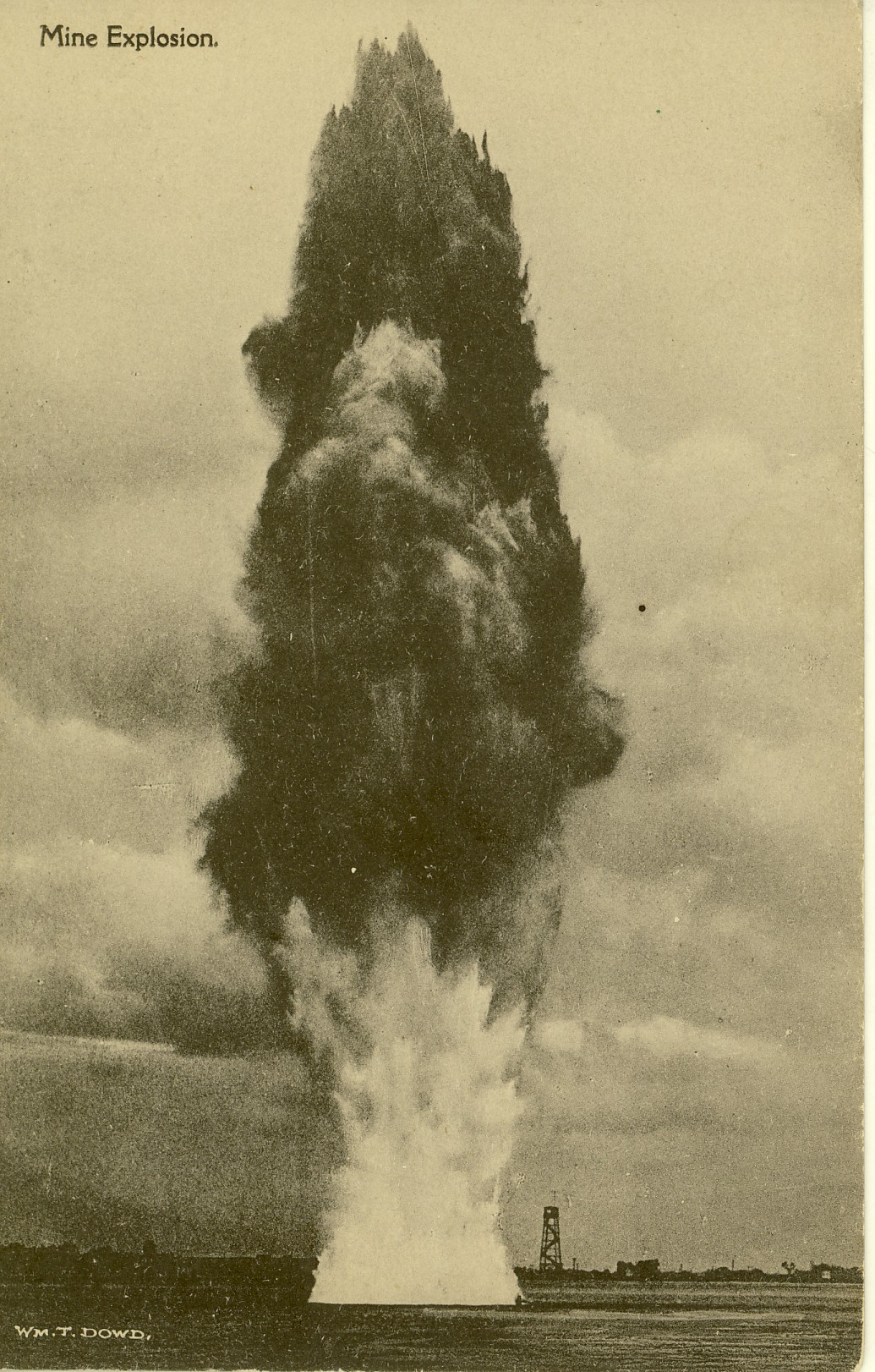
Postcard photo of a mine explosion at Fort Greble, Dutch Island, Rhode Island.

Extensive on-shore facilities, as well as a small fleet of mine-planting boats, supported each mine casemate. For Fort Strong in Boston Harbor, these facilities are illustrated in the map shown at right.

The mine wharf was where the mine planters tied up to load or unload their cargo of mines and connecting cable. This wharf was equipped with a heavy lifting crane. From the wharf, returning mines were carried by the mine tramway (a rail system) to the torpedo storehouse ("torpedo" was an old alternate term for "mine"). This storehouse was the largest building in the mine complex, and was used to store the mines, on large racks, when they had been pulled from the water for testing, repair, or storage (for example, in peacetime). Loaded mines were also stored in the underground magazines of those gun batteries which were disarmed about 1925, at the top of the bluff on the northern end of the fort. These magazines were reached by following the tramway off the map towards the lower left, where it ran up a gradual slope past the "reservoir" (water tower).

Another branch of the tramway led to the loading room, where the TNT charges for the mines were loaded into or unloaded from the mines. A very small TNT storehouse was immediately adjacent to the loading room. Only one box of TNT – 100 lb (45 kg), or half of the load for an average mine – was supposed to be taken from this storehouse at a time for loading.

Another branch of the tramway track lead to the cable tanks, large concrete tanks filled with seawater pumped from the harbor and used for insulation and conductivity testing of the many miles of electrical cable that were used for mine operations. The torpedo storehouse had its own smaller tanks that were used for submergence testing of the mine casings and their fuzes, which were inserted into the casings through watertight plugs.

The mine casemate (pictured in the photo above and in the plan drawing) is also shown on the map. Its coordinates (42.329388°N 70.958288°W) indicate the approximate center of the structure. All traces of the other mine facilities were destroyed by the City of Boston in the 1990s during the redevelopment of the northern end of the fort and its parade ground for use as a summer camp for city children.

== See also ==
- Seacoast defense in the United States
- United States Army Coast Artillery Corps
- Harbor Defense Command
- Harbor Defenses of Boston
- Mine Planter Service (U.S. Army)
- Mine planter (vessel)
- List of ships of the United States Army § Mine Planters
- Minelayer
- Harbor Defense Museum
