= USCGC Pequot (WARC 58) =

US Army mine planter and Coast Guard cable ship

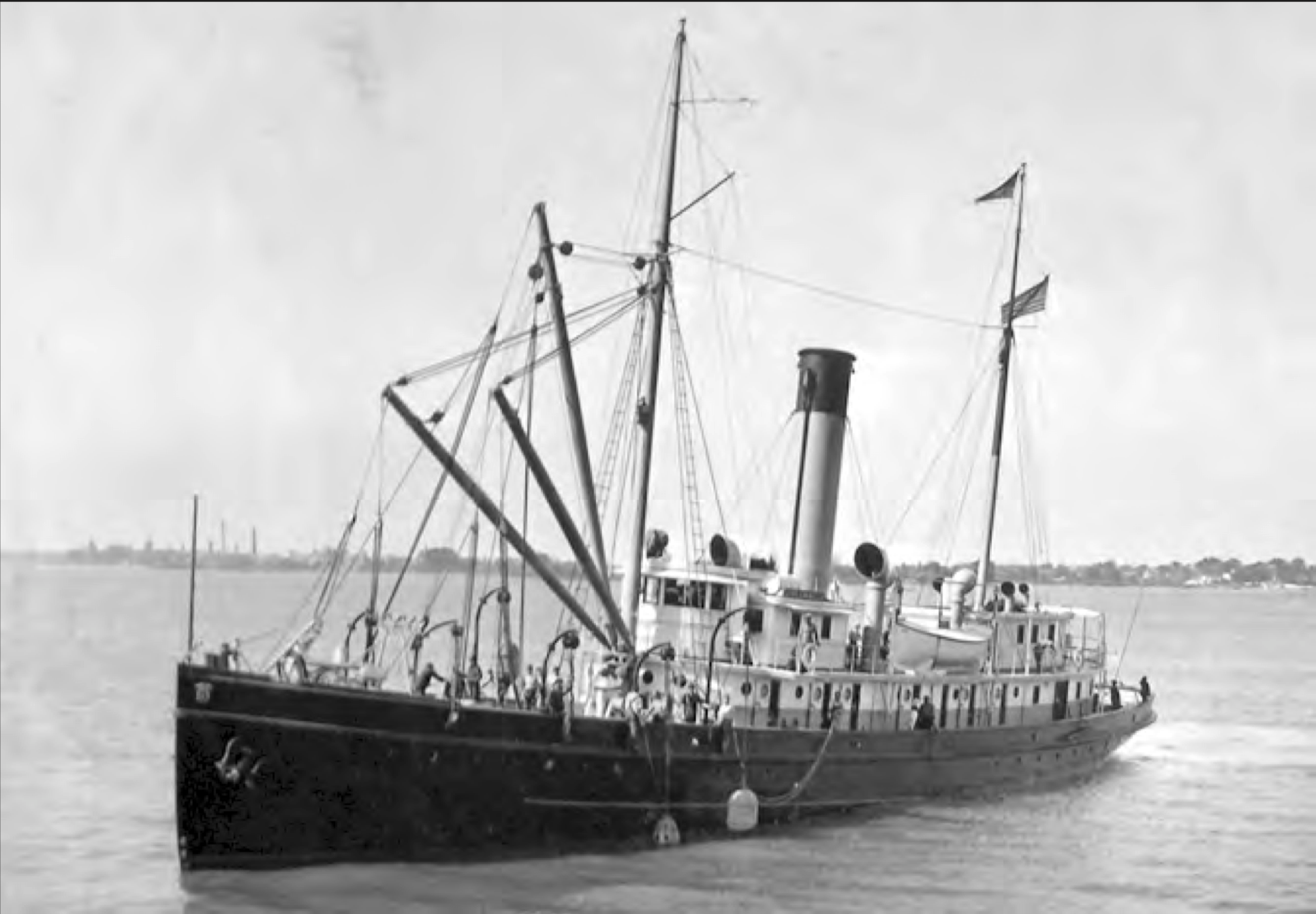
- USAMP General Samuel M. Mills

History

United States Army
- Name: USAMP General Samuel M. Mills
- Builder: New York Shipbuilding Company
- Launched: 13 February 1909
- Acquired: 19 May 1909
- Decommissioned: 22 May 1922
- Identification: Call sign WYB
- Fate: Transferred to Coast Guard

United States Coast Guard
- Name: USCGC Pequot
- Commissioned: 1 May 1922
- Decommissioned: 5 December 1946
- Identification: Call sign NUPJ
- Fate: Sold and scrapped, 1947

General characteristics
- Displacement: 621 long tons (631 t)
- Length: 165 ft (50 m)
- Beam: 32 ft (9.8 m)
- Installed power: 2 steam engines, 900 horsepower each
- Propulsion: 2 propellers

USAMP General Samuel M. Mills was a steel-hulled ship built for service in the U.S. Army as a mine planter. She was launched in February 1909 and traveled extensively along the Atlantic and Gulf Coasts of the United States building, inspecting, and maintaining undersea mine defenses at major harbors.

In 1922 the ship was transferred to the U.S. Coast Guard and commissioned as USCGC Pequot. During her time with the Coast Guard she was the only cable ship in the service. She built, inspected, and maintained submarine cables connecting remote lighthouses to mainland communications networks.

During World War II, control of the Coast Guard was transferred to the U.S. Navy. During the war she laid magnetic indicator loop cables at the entrances to major waterways which were intended to detect U-boats entering American harbors. At the end of the war the ship was decommissioned and finally sold for scrap in 1947.

== Construction and characteristics ==
The acquisition of the Philippines and Hawaii in 1898 led the U.S. Army Coast Artillery Corps to consider how to defend America's Pacific territories. Part of its response was to send all four of its mine planters from the east coast of the United States to the Pacific in 1908. In February 1908, the Army Quartermaster Department, which was responsible for all shipbuilding for the Army, sought bids for a new mine planter to replace one of these ships in the Atlantic. When bids were opened in March they were found to be too high. New specifications sought new bids for up to four new mine planters. On 25 June 1908, the new bids were opened and New York Shipbuilding Company's was the lowest at $164,777 for each vessel. Contracts for three ships were awarded to the firm. These became USAMP General Samuel M. Mills (Contract 75), USAMP General John M. Schofield (Contract 76), and USAMP General Royal T. Frank (Contract 77). A contract for a fourth vessel was awarded to Pusey & Jones Company of Wilmington, Delaware. This became USAMP General E. O. C. Ord.

General Samuel M. Mills was first of the three 1909 mine planters built by New York Shipbuilding at its Camden, New Jersey shipyard. She was launched on 13 February 1909. There was no ceremony at the event. She was accepted by the Army on 19 May 1909.

The ship's hull and main deck house was built of steel plates riveted together. She was 165 ft (50 m) long overall with a beam of 32 feet (9.8 m). Her depth of hold was 17 feet (5.2 m) Her gross register tonnage was 590 and her net register tonnage was 401. Her displacement was 621 tons.

The ship had two 4-bladed propellers which were 7.5 feet (2.3 m) in diameter. They were driven by two compound, reciprocating steam engines, each of which generated 900 horsepower. The engines' high pressure cylinders were 16.5 inches in diameter, and their low pressure cylinders were 34 inches in diameter, with a stroke of 24 inches. Steam was provided by two coal-fired boilers. Her coal bunkers held 120 tons. The ship developed a speed of 14.5 knots on her sea trial.

By 1914 General Mills had a wireless telegraph station aboard. She was assigned the callsign WYB. The ship was equipped with submarine signal receiving equipment which was likely removed in 1918.

The ship's namesake was Brigadier General Samuel M. Mills Jr., who was Chief of Artillery from 1905 to 1906. A second Army mine planter USAMP Brigadier General Samuel M. Mills, built in 1942, was also named for the general.

== US Army service (1909–1922) ==
General Samuel M. Mills arrived at Hampton Roads, Virginia to begin her Army service on 22 May 1909. She was originally stationed at Fort Monroe.

As one of only four Army mine planters on the Atlantic and Gulf coasts of America, the ship travelled extensively to construct, maintain, and inspect submarine mine fields protecting major ports. She also trained soldiers in mine warfare, and participated in simulated attacks on ports to test coastal defenses.

In 1919 General Mills hosted an extended training cruise for 20 soldiers at the Army's artillery school at Fort Monroe. The cruise touched at Savannah, Key West, Havana, and Charleston.

In February 1922 the Chief of the Coast Artillery Corps recommended that USAMP General Samuel M. Mills be transferred to another government department in order to reduce the number of mine planters in active service. General Mills was decommissioned on 22 May 1922.

== U.S. Coast Guard Service (1922–1946) ==
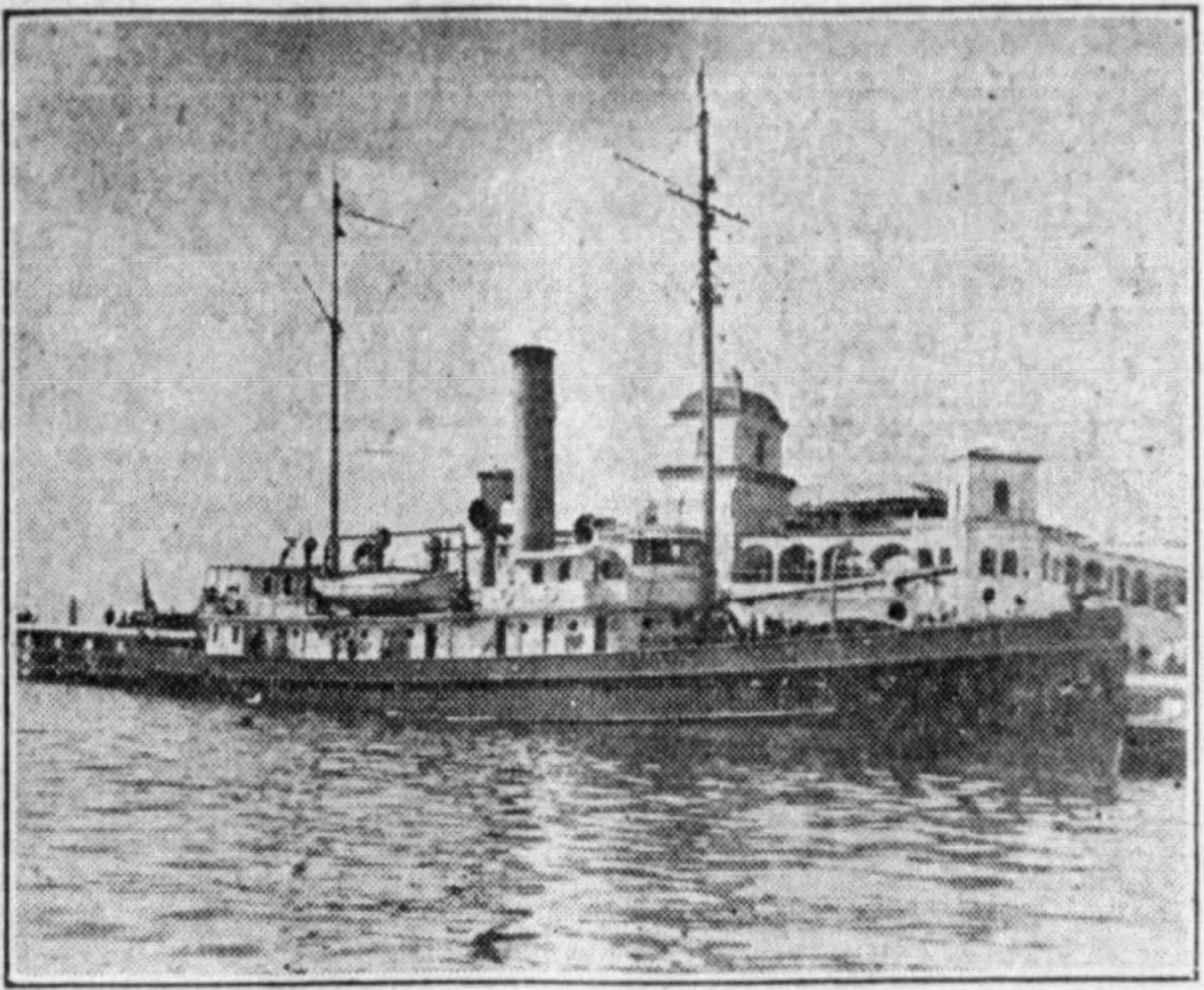
Pequot in 1927

On 5 April 1922, President Harding issued Executive Order 3660 which transferred General Samuel M. Mills from the War Department to the Coast Guard. The first ship named USCGC Pequot towed her replacement, General Mills, from Norfolk to the Coast Guard Yard at Curtis Bay, Maryland, arriving 28 April 1922. There the first Pequot was decommissioned. General Mills was renamed and commissioned as USCGC Pequot on 1 May 1922. Like the first USCGC Pequot, the newly commissioned vessel was used to lay and maintain electrical and communications cables. At some point in her Coast Guard career she was designated a cable-laying ship, WARC, and given the pennant number 58.

Just after the Coast Guard took control of the ship, on 4 May 1922, the newly-commissioned Pequot took on coal at St. Helena, Maryland. The ship began to list as the fuel was brought aboard. Unfortunately, two portholes that had inadvertently been left open were submerged by the list and water began to pour into the ship. She threatened to sink at the dock. Two Navy tugs, USS Hercules (YT-13) and USS Wicomico (YT-26) towed Pequot from the coaling dock, beached her, and pumped her out. She spent much of May through August 1922 at the Coast Guard Yard, Washington Navy Yard, and Brooklyn Navy Yard undergoing repairs and modifications for her Coast Guard service. Pequot began her new work repairing communication cables off the Maine Coast in November 1922.

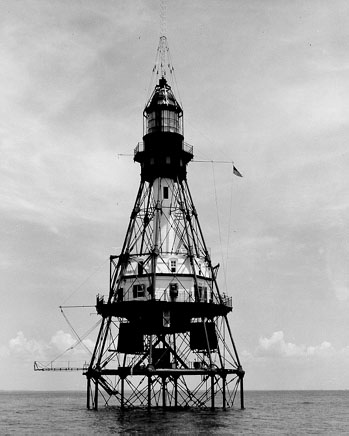
Pequot repaired the cable to Fowey Rocks Light in 1931.

The Coast Guard's mission required many lighthouses and other facilities on outlying islands and remote points that were not served by conventional utilities. Providing links to these isolated points was Pequot's main job. For example, two attempts to connect the Rockland, Maine Harbor Breakwater Light to telephone service failed when winter ice destroyed cables placed on the breakwater. In 1923, Pequot laid 6,000 feet (1,800 m) of submarine cable, which was not affected by ice, to connect the lighthouse to shore. Pequot repaired the broken cable between Halfway Rock Light and the Maine mainland in 1926. In 1929 the ship repaired the cable between the lighthouse on Cuttyhunk Island and Dartmouth, Massachusetts on the mainland. In 1930 she laid a telephone cable from Egmont Key, and Mullet Key, Florida to Pass-a-Grille on the mainland. In 1931 she replaced a cable between Boston Light and Graves Light that had been broken for 14 years, and repaired cables to the Carysfort Reef and Fowey Rocks lights near Miami. Pequot laid a cable to the North Pass Light near Port Aransas, Texas in 1932. During February 1940 Pequot replaced a 55,000 feet (17 km) cable from Block Island to Point Judith, Rhode Island. In May 1929 the Coast Guard had approximately 500 miles of submarine cable in service and only one ship, Pequot, dedicated to maintaining it.

The miles of 2-inch diameter submarine cable Pequot used were delivered to port by railcar and then loaded onto the ship. When repairing a cable, the crew inspected its entire length and replaced damaged and degraded sections. When a portion of a cable could not be raised from the seabed for inspection, for example if coral rock had grown over it pinning it the bottom, the cable would be replaced. When lengths of cable were replaced, the crew attempted to remove the old cable so that it would not interfere with future maintenance work on the new cable.

Like many Coast Guard cutters, Pequot assisted ships in distress. In July 1927 the British schooner Valdare lost her rudder and was disabled off the coast of Maine. Pequot towed her safely back to port. In August 1931 she and USLHT Anemone pulled the passenger steamer Naushon off the rocks near Vineyard Haven, Massachusetts where she had grounded during a storm. The four-masted lumber ship Alvena hit the Portland Lightship in a fog during June 1936 and was disabled. Pequot was nearby conducting cable repairs and noticed Alvena flying distress signals. She towed the sailing ship back to port for repairs.

Pequot found herself in need of assistance on 12 December 1938. She was repairing a broken cable to the Minot's Ledge Light when it fouled one of her propellers. Unable to maneuver, the ship settled onto the ledge as the tide ebbed. Six hours later, as the tide rose, she floated off and was able to proceed to Boston. The ship also had a mishap in January 1931 while grappling for a cable between Knights Key and the Sombrero Key Light in Florida. Rather than raising the Coast Guard cable, the ship snagged a Western Union cable and broke it, causing over $1,000 in damages. In April 1934 Pequot hit a dock in Galveston and did $490 in damage.

The Coast Guard absorbed the U.S. Lighthouse Service on 1 July 1939, requiring a reorganization of the combined service. As of 1 July 1940, Pequot was stationed in Boston, but under the jurisdiction of Coast Guard headquarters, not any of the Coast Guard District commands. On 1 November 1941 President Roosevelt signed Executive Order 8929 transferring the Coast Guard from Treasury Department control to Navy Department control. Pequot earned the American Defense Service Medal with the "A" device for her service in the Atlantic prior to the American entrance into World War II.

=== World War II ===
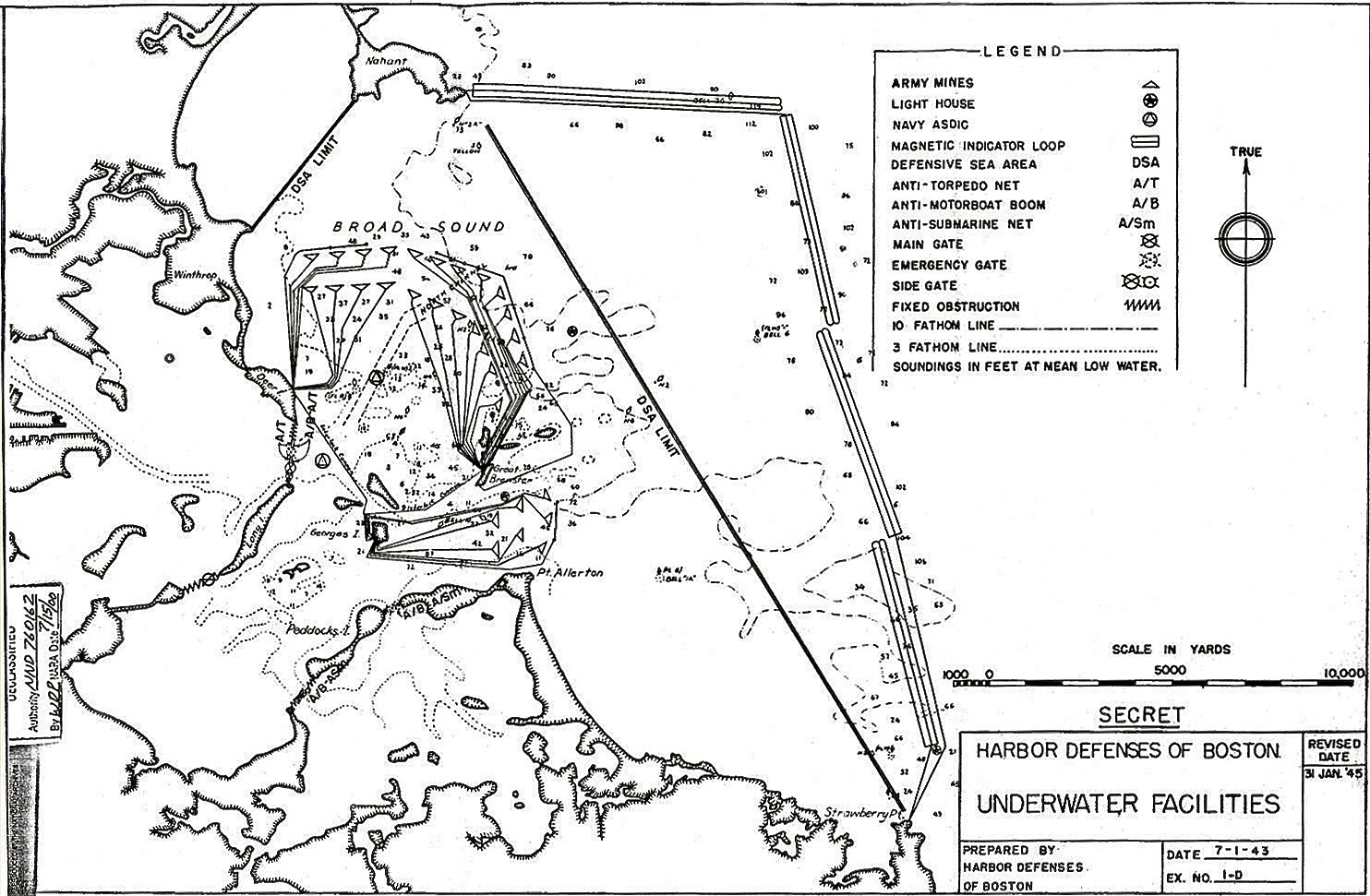
Pequot laid the four magnetic indicator loops outside Boston Harbor during World War II

During World War II, Pequot was organizationally part of the 1st Naval District within the Eastern Sea Frontier. She was based in Boston. She had two 20mm guns and an SO-1 surface search radar installed for her wartime service. Her complement rose to 4 officers, 2 warrant officers, and 63 men in 1945.

Pequot's cable laying expertise was used to establish magnetic indicator loops along the coast of New England. Cables laid by the ship were intended to detect the passage of a German U-boat by small electrical signals induced by the submarine's magnetic field. She laid indicator loop cables in Casco Bay, Maine in May 1942, at the entrance to Boston Harbor, and elsewhere in New England.

On 1 January 1946 President Truman issued Executive Order 9666 returning the Coast Guard to the control of the Treasury Department. Pequot was decommissioned on 5 December 1946. She was replaced by USCGC Yamacraw (WARC 333).

== Sale and scrapping ==
Pequot was declared surplus and transferred to the United States Maritime Commission for disposal. The ship was offered for sale along with dozens of other vessels made surplus by the end of the war. Sealed bids were opened on 31 July 1947. Pequot was sold on 5 September 1947 to Potomac Shipwrecking Company of Popes Creek, Maryland, which scrapped her for her steel.

== See also ==
Photographer Leslie Jones produced three photos of Pequot in 1930 shown here.

Photographs of Samuel M. Mills and Pequot, and original construction drawings of General Mills are shown here.
