= Mine planter =

Mine warfare ship

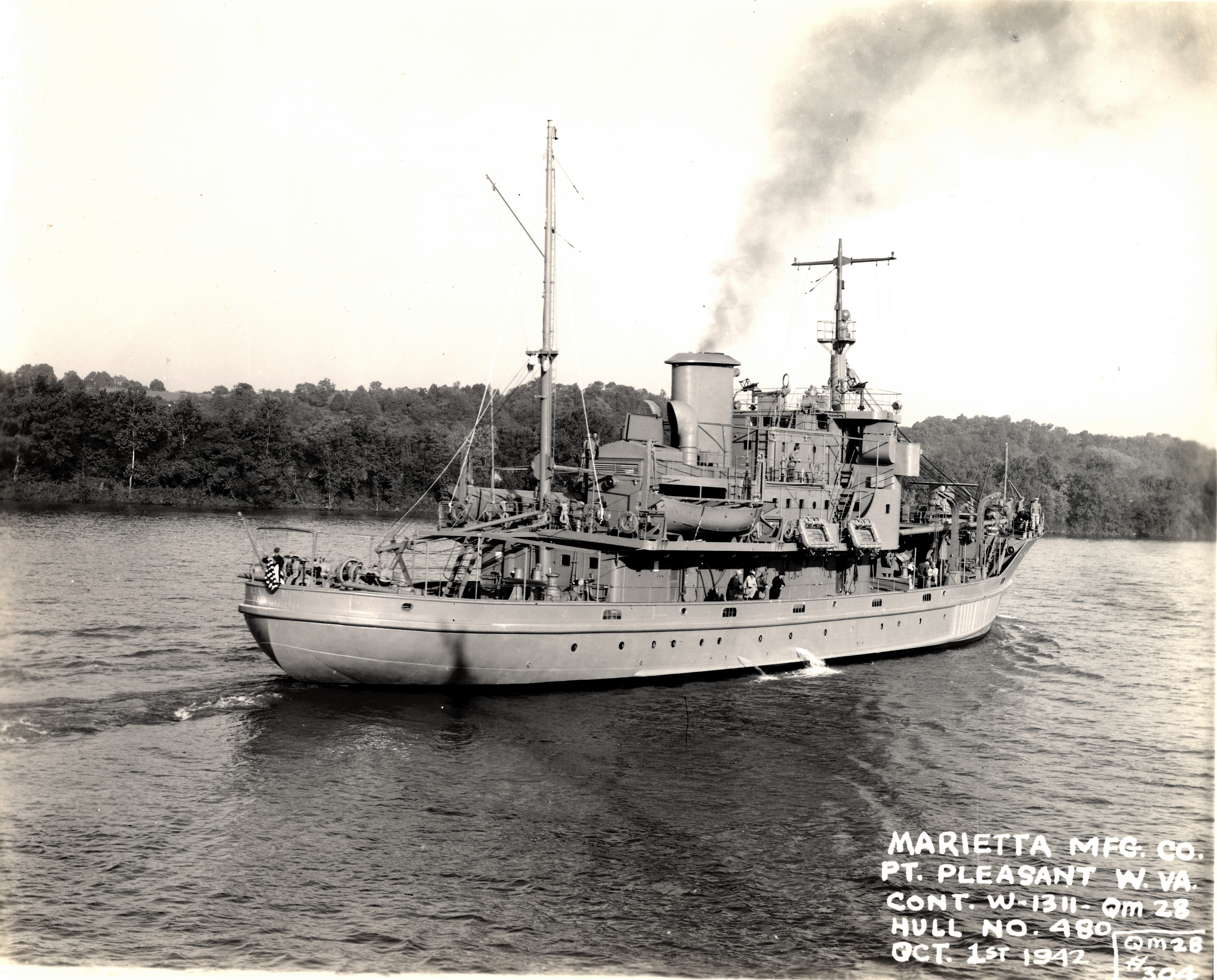
- Army M 1 Mine Planter "Hull No. 480", USAMP MP-7 Major General Wallace F. Randolph. Records (#742), Special Collections Department, J. Y. Joyner Library, East Carolina University, Greenville, North Carolina, US.

Mine planter and the earlier "torpedo planter" was a term used for mine warfare ships into the early days of World War I. In later terminology, particularly in the United States, a mine planter was a ship specifically designed to install controlled mines or contact mines in coastal fortifications. This type of ship diverged in both function and design from a ship operating as a naval minelayer. Though the vessel may be seagoing it is not designed to lay large numbers of mines in open sea. A mine planter was designed to place controlled minefields in exact locations so that they might be fired individually or as a group from shore when observers noted a target to be at or near a designated mine's position. The terms and types of specialized ship existed from the 1860s where "torpedoes" were made famous in the American Civil War until the demise of large, fixed coastal fortifications brought on by the changes of World War II.

== History and terminology ==
The earliest naval mines were the "torpedoes" associated with harbor defenses. Thus the vessels required to place the torpedoes were termed torpedo planters with the equipment evolving with the mines. For example, in the record of the Sixtieth Congress of 1908 there is mention of "procurement of one torpedo planter and two launches for the Hawaiian Islands" in connection with submarine mines in Hawaiian Island defenses. In the United States and some other countries there was a coastal defense "torpedo service" that required vessels capable of placing the devices and associated firing cables as early as the late 19th century. By 1904 the first vessels specifically designed for this work were under construction in the United States. These were to emplace the controlled minefields that were a major part of the Endicott program that was the origin of the Coast Artillery Corps.

The outbreak of naval warfare in World War I saw extensive use of sea mines. The first naval ships destined to be minelayers were first termed mine planters as seen in Navy ship references. The term appears to be used interchangeably in naval usage during that period. For example, in an address to the U.S. Navy ships of Mine Squadron One at Portland, England Admiral Sims used the term "mine layer" while the introduction speaks of the men assembled from the "mine planters". As the distinct difference between "planting" individual mines and "laying" mine barrages by dropping large numbers of mines at sea emerged the term minelayer began to apply to the naval vessels engaged and built for this type of operation.

In the coastal defense system the usage of mine planter was continued. In the United States 1918 saw the creation of the U. S. Army Mine Planter Service (USAMPS). The designation of mine planter was continued for the largest specialized ships of that service until the effective end of the service in the closing years of World War II. During that time the formal usage of Mine Planter was applied to the ships and their names were prefixed by U.S. Army Mine Planter (USAMP). The USAMPS was formally ended in 1954 by Congress in the Warrant Officer Personnel Act some five years after its vessels had been dispersed.

=== Design and function ===
The earliest U.S. vessels involved in the work were not specially designed for the purpose. Vessels capable of handling heavy loads over the side were drafted into the function. Some were small tugs and other commercial types. The ship required suitable rigging to lift the mines and anchors along with associated cables over the side for planting. Adequate deck space was also required for safe work and to carry the mines. Stability was also a factor as some of the small vessels had shown themselves to be less than stable with such loads. By the early days of the 20th century the Army's experience with some of these vessels indicated a need for a design specifically adapted to the work. By 1904 the first of these ships were under construction.

=== Collateral duties ===
The planters and associated vessels performed a number of duties beyond tending the minefields. Target towing was a specific task assigned to the vessels. They also served as observation platforms during demonstration or exercise firing of either the fortification guns or mines. In the later, cable capable vessels, they laid telephone and other communication cables within the coastal fortification systems. During Army's summer camp for Army Reserve, National Guard and ROTC or occasional official visits they served as cruise vessels for tours and occasional entertainment. The ships were assigned transportation duty as required and when available to support Coast Artillery missions.

== Obsoletion ==
The entire concept of massive fixed fortifications was shown to be obsolete in the early days of World War II. By the end of the war the Coast Artillery Corps mission was already shifting to air defense and coast fortifications were being stripped. The Mine Planter Service ships appear to be engaged more in their collateral duties than working the minefields.

=== Mine Planter Disposition ===
One of the M 1 (1942–43) ships, General Samuel M. Mills of 1942, was retained by the Army and assigned to other missions while another was sold directly to commercial interests and became a fishing vessel.

==== U.S. Navy ====
By early 1944 most of the 1942–43 ships were being transferred to the U.S. Navy to be converted into a class termed the Auxiliary Minelayer (ACM/MMA) with some of those vessels already working in the European Theater or headed to Japan when the war ended.

==== U.S. Coast Guard ====
Mine planters were designed to handle heavy mines over the side, rather than dropping mines astern from racks or rails as is usual in naval minelayers. As a result, many of these vessels had particular applicability to the U.S. Coast Guard buoy tending role. A number of the pre-World War II ships became the Coast Guard Speedwell class through the U.S. Lighthouse Service (USLHS) after a 1920 reduction in the Army. Several became small cable ships. A number of the World War II-constructed vessels followed their predecessors of the USLHS/USCG in going from Navy to the Coast Guard as postwar buoy tenders.

== U.S. Army mine planters ==
=== Mine planters & associated ships 1904–1909 ===
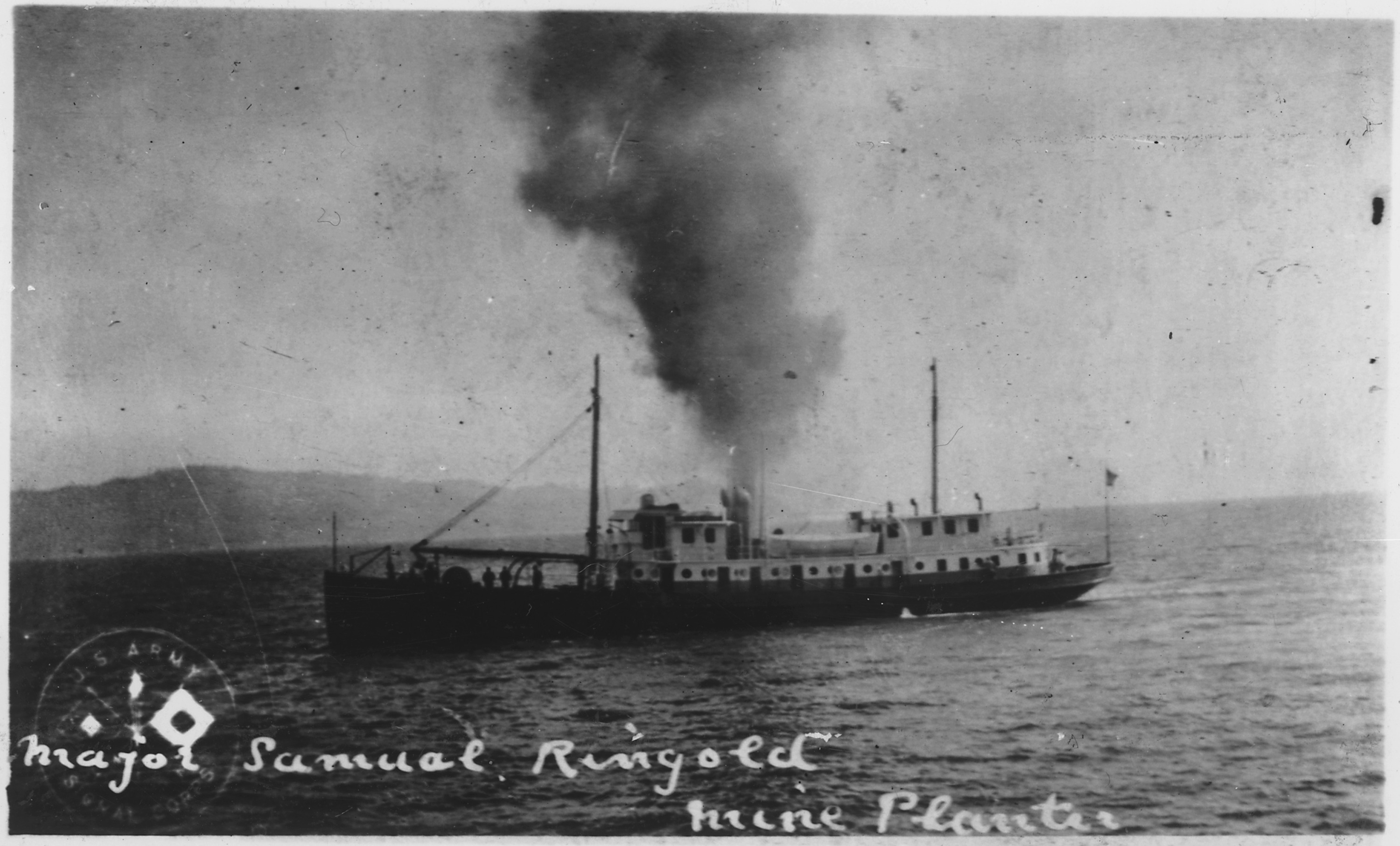
USAMP Major Samuel Ringgold, built 1904 (National Archives and Records Administration)

The first specialized Army mine planters were built in 1904, with a second group in 1909. These were to emplace and maintain the controlled minefields that were a major part of the Endicott program that was the origin of the Coast Artillery Corps. These ships were designed to plant mines but lacked full, specialized capability to lay and maintain the minefield control cables. Some of these ships are noted in official documents as "torpedo planters", showing the evolution of terminology. Ships under Signal Corps direction assisted. One of the ships, Joseph Henry, was taken into the Coast Artillery Corps for that purpose.

- Col. George Armistead
- Col. Henry J. Hunt
- Gen. Henry Knox
- Maj. Samuel Ringgold
- Gen. Royal T. Frank (Became Army small transport serving in Hawaii, sunk by Japanese submarine I-71 on 28 January 1942)
- Gen. Samuel M. Mills (transferred to U.S. Coast Guard on 29 April 1922, named USCGC Pequot (WARC-58) on 1 May 1922, served as a cable ship until decommissioned on 5 December 1946)
- Gen. E. O. C. Ord
- Gen. John M. Schofield

Cable ships Cyrus W. Field and Joseph Henry were associated with mine cable work and next generation mine planter development that incorporated cable capability into the new ships. Joseph Henry was taken into the Mine Planter Service. Cyrus W. Field appears listed only in association with mine cable work and with the mine planters in archival records.

- Joseph Henry (Became Greek cable ship Thalis o Milisios, now at the Maritime Museum at Faliro, Athens)
- Cyrus W. Field (Remained with Signal Corps doing mine and other cable work.)

=== Mine planters 1917–1919 ===
A year after the 1918 establishment of the Mine Planter Service the next generation of vessels specifically designed to plant and maintain the mines and cables comprising the mine battery of the harbor defense commands was added to the fleet. A year later, 1920, saw a major reduction in the Army and the transfer of six of these new ships to the U.S. Lighthouse Service. The former mine planters were converted to lighthouse tenders and buoy tenders. The Lighthouse Service was merged into the U.S. Coast Guard in 1939, and the former mine planters were transferred accordingly.

- Gen. William M. Graham
- Col. George F. E. Harrison
- Gen. Absalom Baird
- Gen. J. Franklin Bell / Brig. Gen. John J. Hayden
- Brig. Gen. Edmund Kirby (Ilex, (WAGL-222)])
- Gen. Wallace F. Randolph ( Lupine (WAGL-230))
- Gen. John P. Story (Acacia (WAGL-200))
- Col. Albert Todd (Lotus (WAGL-229))
- Col. Garland N. Whistler (Spruce (WAGL-246))
- Col. John V. White (Speedwell (WAGL-245))

=== Mine planter 1937 ===
- Lt. Col. Ellery W. Niles (Became Army Signal Corps cable ship, then RV F.V. Hunt and finally sunk as reef as Cayman Salvage Master)

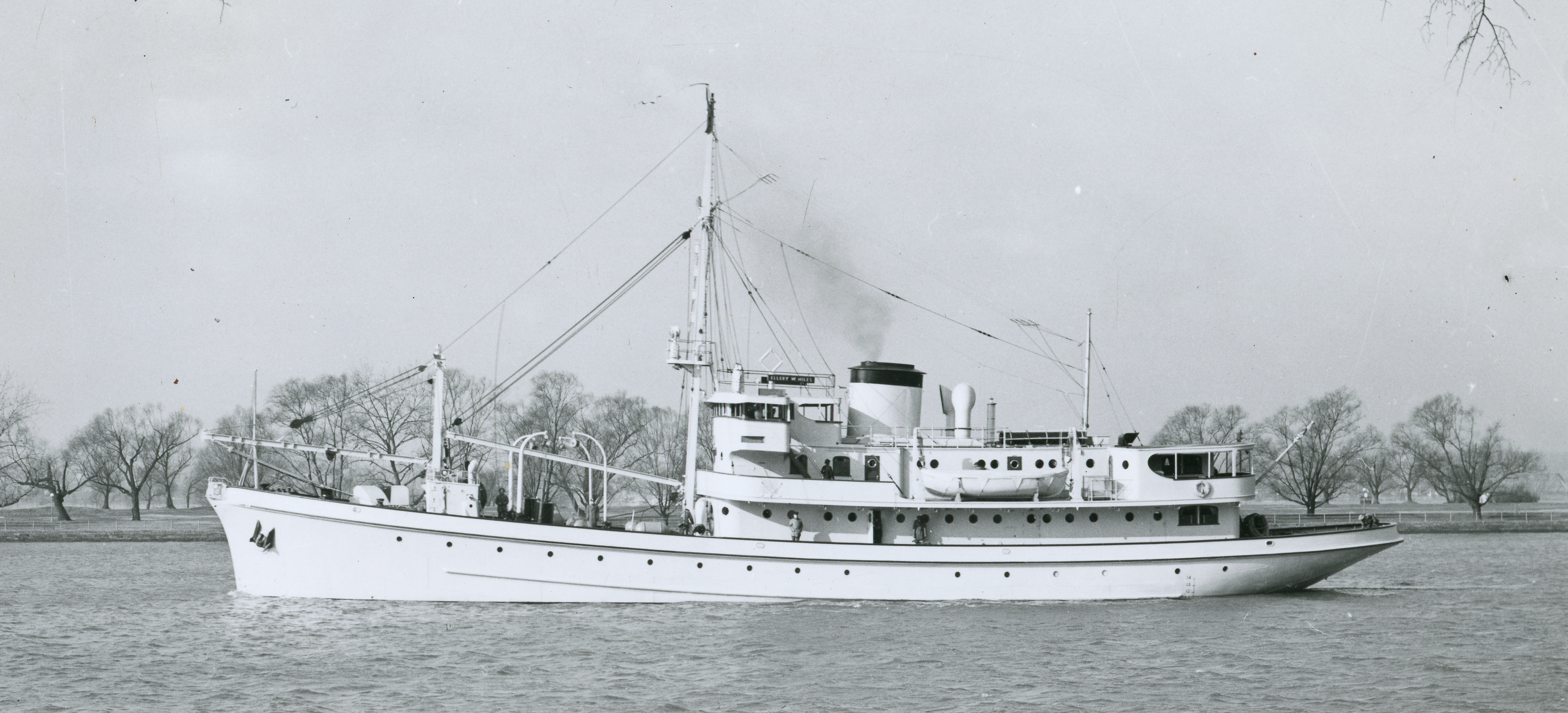
U.S. Army Mine Planter, Ellery W. Niles, Enroute Down the Potomac to Fort Monroe, Virginia (National Archives: Records of the Office of the Chief Signal Officer)

Only one ship of this class was built. She was the first fully capable cable ship and mine planter with diesel electric power. The USAMP Ellery W. Niles, captioned in a photo as "The last word in mine planters" and a major change into a more modern and capable form. After a tour of the East Coast Ellery W. Niles went on to serve on the West Coast based in San Francisco.

=== Mine planters 1942–1943 ===
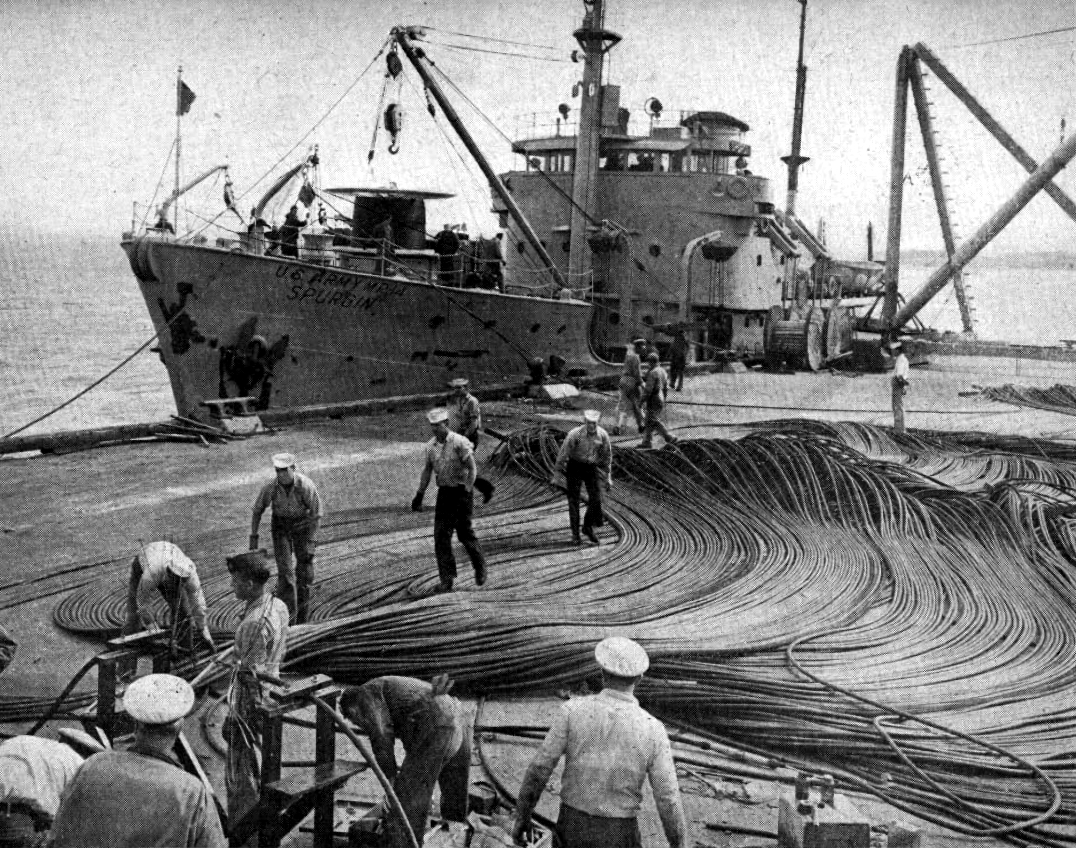
Col. Horace F. Spurgin (MP-14) probably around the time of turn over to U.S. Navy (photo from All Hands magazine, March 1950)

The requirement for more ships capable of planting the mines and installing and maintaining the control and communications cables of the coastal fortifications was underway on the entry of the United States into WW II. Sixteen new vessels were planned or started by that time at the Marietta Manufacturing yard at Point Pleasant, West Virginia. Those ships were delivered to the Mine Planter Service during 1942 and 1943, designated the M 1 Mine Planter and given MP numbers.

- USAMP General Henry Knox (MP-1) (USS Picket (ACM-8) then USCGC Willow (WAGL / WLB-332))
- USAMP Colonel Henry J. Hunt (MP-2) (USS Bastion (ACM 6) then USCGC Jonquil (WAGL / WLB-330))
- USAMP Colonel George Armistead (MP-3) (USS Barbican (ACM-5) then USCGC Ivy (WLB-329/WAGL-329))
- Gen. Samuel M. Mills (MP-4) ("remained in Army service into the 1950s; became Liberian Gran Canaria until scrapped in 1975")
- USAMP 1st Lt. William G. Sylvester (MP-5) (USS Obstructor (ACM-7) then USCGC Heather (WABL/WLB-331))
- Brig. Gen. Henry L. Abbott (MP-6) ("became American fishing vessel Neptune; foundered in 1975")
- USAMP Major General Wallace F. Randolph (MP-7) (Nausett (MMA 15))
- USAMP Colonel John Storey (MP-8) (USS Barricade (ACM-3) then USCGC Magnolia (WAGL/WLB-328))
- Maj. Gen. Arthur Murray (MP-9) (USS Trapper (ACM-9) then USS Yamacraw (ARC-5) then USCGC Yamacraw (WARC-333)
- Maj. Gen. Erasmus Weaver (MP-10) (USS Canonicus (ACM-12/MMA 12))
- Maj. Samuel Ringgold (MP-11) (Monadnock (ACM-14/MMA 14) not commissioned)
- Brig. Gen. Royal T. Frank (MP-12) (Camanche (ACM-11/MMA 11))
- Col. Alfred A. Maybach (MP-13) (Puritan (ACM-16 / MMA 16))
- Col. Horace F. Spurgin (MP-14) (USS Miantonomah (ACM-13 / MMA 13))
- Col. Charles W. Bundy (MP-15) (USS Chimo (ACM 1))
- Col. George Ricker (MP-16) (USS Planter (ACM 2))

=== Other Army mine vessels ===
The mine planting process required assistance by other, smaller vessels. Some, almost as capable as the planters, were termed Junior Mine Planter. The Junior Mine Planters were often commercial designs, with a number converted or specially built during the war. In 1919 there were over 30 Junior Mine Planters. They occasionally show up as "Mine Planter" with the "Junior" dropped. One, General Richard Arnold, a 1909 tug, sank in the process of rescuing another mine vessel.

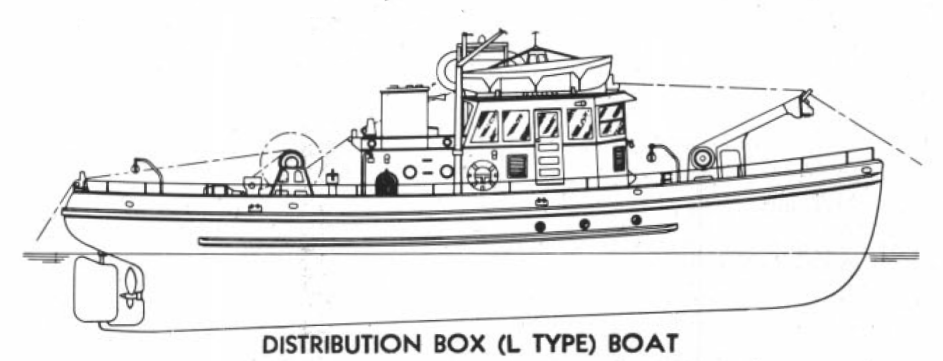
Diagram of a U.S. Army Distribution Box (L Type) boat, used by the Coast Artillery to maintain minefields in WWII.

A specialized vessel, the Distribution Box Boat (DB Boat), was designed to install and maintain the distribution boxes from which individual cables branched to each mine in a mine group. A number of the later Distribution Box Boats ended up in the Navy, often becoming known simply as "Box Boats" or "Box L" boats working as small service vessels or still working in harbor defense. Mine Yawls and other small craft assisted in both mine work and all the other duties of small vessels within the harbor defenses, in which individual forts or batteries were often separated by large bodies of water.

== Mine planting vessels of other nations ==
Other nations using precisely placed, cable connected mines in controlled mine fields for coastal defense required vessels similar in function. The 1945 Mine Disposal Handbook shows controlled mines being in the inventory for the United States, Britain, Germany, Italy and Japan. Examples of analogous vessels include the Royal Navy's Linnet-class and M-class Indicator Loop Mine Layers, as well as Japan's larger Hashima-class cable layers that were also designed for mine planting.

== See also ==
- Mine Planter Service (U.S. Army)
- List of ships of the United States Army § Mine Planters
- United States Army Coast Artillery Corps
- Seacoast defense in the United States
- Controlled mines
- Submarine mines in U.S. harbor defense
- USCG seagoing buoy tender

== Bibliography ==
- Berhow, Mark A., ed. (2015). American Seacoast Defenses, A Reference Guide (Third ed.). McLean, Virginia: CDSG Press. ISBN 978-0-9748167-3-9.
- Burritt, Ida Calhoun (1942). "U. S. A. T. Royal T. Frank - Requiescat in Pace (with photo)" (PDF). The Field Artillery Journal. 32 (December). United States Field Artillery Association: 911–912.
- Chappell, Gordon. "Forts Under the Sea: Submarine Mine Defense of San Francisco Bay". The California State Military Museum. Archived from the original on October 31, 2014.
- Clay, Steven E. (2010). US Army Order of Battle 1919–1941, vol. 2 (PDF). Fort Leavenworth, Kansas: Combat Studies Institute Press.
- Collins, J. (3 September 2009). "The History of SubRon 14 The USS Hunley AS31". ThistleGroup.
- Colton, T. (December 19, 2011). "U.S. Army Mine Craft". T. Colton. Archived from the original on 23 June 2013.
- Gardner, FQC. "Random Recollections; 17. OFFICER IN CHARGE OF THE TORPEDO DEPOT". Archived from the original on 3 March 2016.
- Grover, David (1987). U.S. Army Ships and Watercraft of World War II. Naval Institute Press. ISBN 0-87021-766-6. LCCN 87015514.
- Hackett, Bob; Kingsepp, Sander (2010). "IJN Submarine I-171: Tabular Record of Movement (date Japan time)". SENSUIKAN!.
- Hartshorn, Derick S. (11 April 2012). "Mineman Memories – Little Creek, VA Harbor Defense Unit".
- Jackson, Ramon (20 November 2013). "Army Ships – The Ghost Fleet – Coast Artillery Corps – Army Mine Planter Service". Archived from the original on 27 September 2011.
- Jackson, Ramon (1 December 2009). "R/V F. V. Hunt". Archived from the original on 3 February 2002.
- Jones, Henry L. (1939). "History of Army Mine Planters". Coast Artillery Journal. LXXXII (September–October). United States Coast Artillery Association.
- Kube-McDowell, Michael (23 July 2009). "Army Vessels of New York Shipbuilding Co". A Place Called Yorkship.
- Naval History & Heritage Command (11 October 1998). "USS San Francisco (Cruiser #5, C-5, later CM-2)". Naval History & Heritage Command. Archived from the original on May 29, 2000.
- Naval History & Heritage Command (23 March 2005). "USS Saranac (ID # 1702), 1918–1919". Naval History & Heritage Command. Archived from the original on February 15, 2005.
- Naval History & Heritage Command (15 January 2006). "Photo #: NH 41736—U.S. Navy Mine Layers". Naval History & Heritage Command. Archived from the original on August 18, 2006.
- Priolo, Gary P.; Radigan, Joe (2014). "Auxiliary Minelayer (ACM / MMA) Index". NavSource.
- SeacoastNH. "Mine Planter Richard Arnold Sinks". SeacoastNH.
- Sims, W.S. (1918), "Speech of Admiral W. S. Sims, U. S. Navy", The Northern Barrage—Mine Force—United States Atlantic Fleet, Annapolis, Maryland: U.S. Naval Institute, pp. 107–108
- U.S. Coast Guard, Historian. "Pequot, 1922 (WARC-58) ex-General Samuel M. Mills" (PDF). United States Coast Guard.
- U.S. Coast Guard, Historian. "Speedwell, 1923 (WAGL-245) ex-Colonel John V. White" (PDF). United States Coast Guard.
- United States Congress (1908). "Sixtieth Congress Sess. I Ch. 202, p. 396". United States Congress.
- U.S. National Archives and Records Administration. "Records of United States Regular Army Mobile Units, 1821–1942 – 391.2.6 Records of U.S. Army mine planters".
- U.S. Navy Bomb Disposal School (1945). Mine Disposal Handbook. U.S. Navy (portions reproduced at Historic Naval Ships Association.
- Warrant Officer Historical Foundation (2014). "Army Warrant Officer History—"The Legacy of Leadership as a Warrant Officer"—Part I - 1918 to 1996". Warrant Officer Historical Foundation.
- Waters, Kenneth L. (2001). "Question 18/99: US Army Mine-planters Transferred to the USN". Warship International. XXXVIII (2). International Naval Research Organization: 151. ISSN 0043-0374.
