= Harbor Defenses of Portsmouth =

Coordinates: 43°04′17″N 70°42′37″W

- Active: 1900-1950
- Country: United States
- Branch: United States Army Coast Artillery Corps
- Type: Coast artillery
- Role: Harbor Defense Command
- Part of: First Army 1933–1941; Eastern Defense Command 1941–1945
- Garrison/HQ: Fort Constitution, New Castle, NH; Camp Langdon, New Castle, NH (World War II)
- Motto: We are one
- Mascot: Oozlefinch

The Harbor Defenses of Portsmouth was a United States Army Coast Artillery Corps harbor defense command. It coordinated the coast defenses of Portsmouth, New Hampshire and the nearby Portsmouth Naval Shipyard in Kittery, Maine from 1900 to 1950, both on the Piscataqua River, beginning with the Endicott program. These included both coast artillery forts and underwater minefields. The command originated circa 1900 as the Portsmouth Artillery District, was renamed Coast Defenses of Portsmouth in 1913, and again renamed Harbor Defenses of Portsmouth in 1925.

== History ==
=== Early Portsmouth forts ===
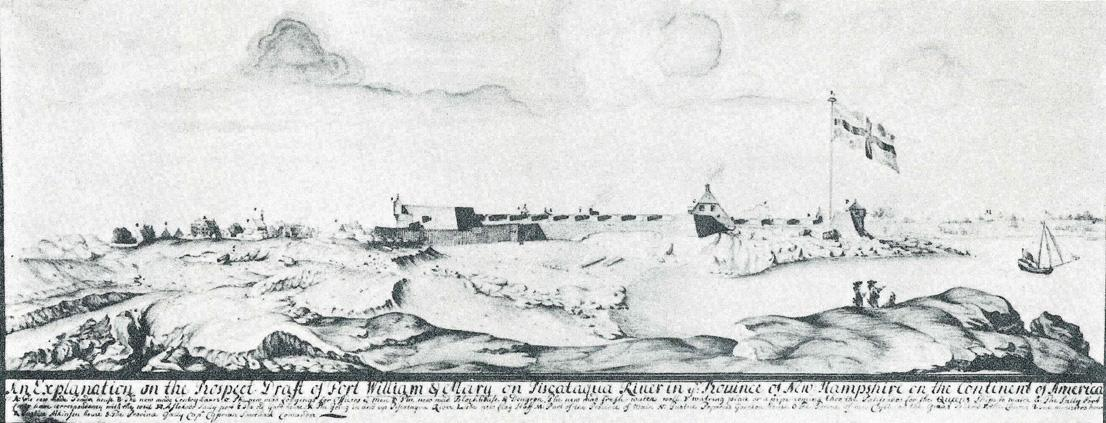
Fort William and Mary by Wolfgang William Romer (1705).

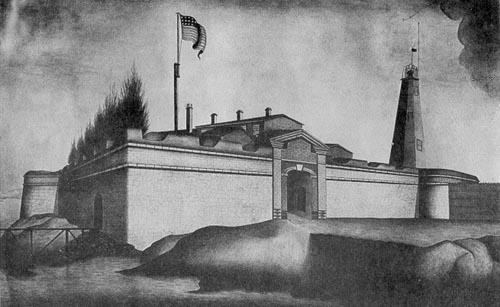
Fort Constitution in the 19th century.

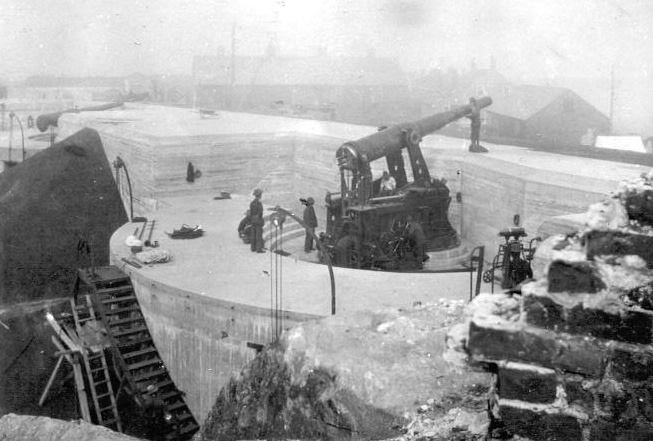
Battery Farnsworth, 8-inch disappearing gun emplacement, Fort Constitution.

The first fort in the Portsmouth area was Fort William and Mary (called The Castle until circa 1692) in New Castle, initially garrisoned before 1632 and perhaps the oldest continuously fortified site in the British colonies that later became the United States. In 1680 another small fort was established on the site of the later Fort McClary in Kittery, Maine, then a part of Massachusetts. This was called Fort Pepperrell after its builder, William Pepperrell. In 1720 this became a permanent battery of six guns named Fort William.

In 1746 Battery Cumberland was built at Jaffrey's (Jerry's) Point in New Castle. Both Fort William and Mary and Fort William figured in the American Revolution. On 14–15 December 1774 Fort William and Mary was raided twice. On the first night a large group of patriots led by John Langdon overpowered a six-man caretaker detachment and confiscated much of the fort's supply of gunpowder. On the second night another raid under John Sullivan seized 16 of the fort's cannon and a number of muskets. These raids were the first acts of the Revolution in New Hampshire. In 1775 Fort William was seized by New Hampshire militia and expanded. The British recaptured Fort William and Mary, but eventually abandoned it and New Hampshire; the Patriot forces probably renamed it Fort Hancock.

Other forts built during the Revolution in the Portsmouth area included Fort Washington on Peirce Island in Portsmouth and Fort Sullivan on Seavey's Island in Kittery, near the later site of the Portsmouth Naval Prison. Both were built in 1775 and were named for George Washington and local hero John Sullivan. Fort Washington was a star-shaped earthwork. Both forts were commanded by Captain Titus Salter (or Salten) during the Revolution. They were re-garrisoned in the War of 1812 and abandoned after that war.

Following the Revolution Fort William and Mary was called Castle Fort or Fort Castle. In 1794 the United States Army took over the fort as part of the first system of US fortifications, adding a two-story blockhouse. In 1808 the fort was rebuilt and renamed Fort Constitution while Fort McClary was constructed across the river, both of these under the second system of fortifications. Around this time Battery Cumberland was rebuilt with stone as the Fort at Jaffrey's Point. A Martello tower was added to Fort Constitution during the War of 1812, while a blockhouse was added to Fort McClary in 1844. Major expansions of both forts were begun during the Civil War under the third system of forts, but were abandoned incomplete in 1867; war experience showed that masonry forts were too vulnerable to rifled cannon. Fort Constitution's north front was demolished to prepare for the third system expansion. Fort Sullivan at the Navy Yard was rebuilt in 1861 with eleven 8-inch Rodman guns. In the 1870s Jaffrey's (Jerry's) Point became the center in the Portsmouth area of a soon-abandoned rebuilding of the US fort system, with a 12-gun earth-protected battery called the Battery at Jerry's Point.

=== Endicott period ===
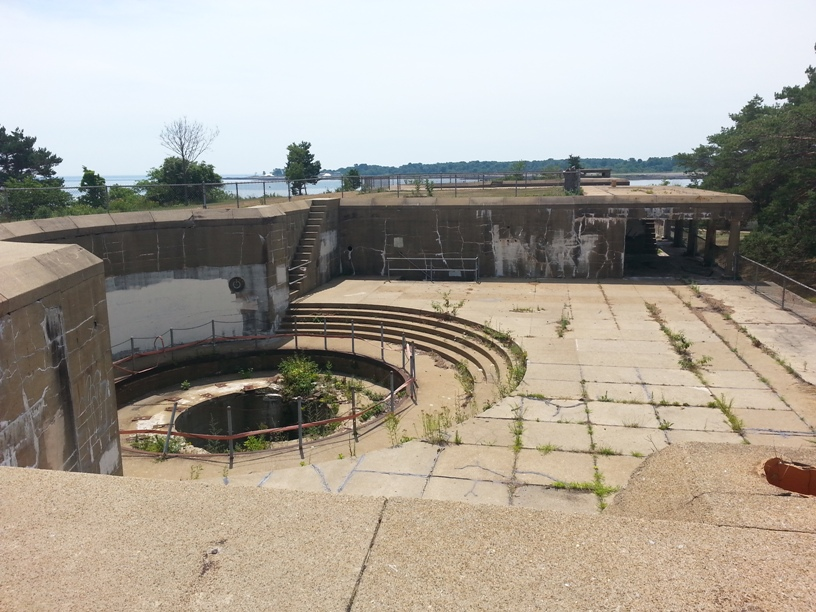
12-inch (305 mm) disappearing gun emplacement, Fort Stark.

As recommended by the Endicott Board of 1885, construction began in 1898 on three forts to defend the Portsmouth area. Fort Stark on Jaffrey's Point was the largest, Fort Foster in Kittery was second, and two new batteries were built adjacent to Fort Constitution. An underwater minefield also guarded the harbor, initially controlled from a mine casemate at Fort Stark. Before much work had been done the Spanish–American War broke out in 1898. Emergency batteries were constructed to quickly arm key points, as most of the Endicott batteries were still years from completion and it was feared the Spanish fleet would bombard the US East Coast. The batteries built for Portsmouth were at Fort Stark, with two 8-inch (203 mm) M1888 guns mounted on converted carriages built for Rodman guns in the 1870s emplacements, and at Fort McClary, with three 15-inch (381 mm) Rodman guns. A Civil War-era battery of four 100-pounder (6.4-inch, 163 mm) Parrott rifles at Fort Constitution was also available. The 8-inch guns were removed in 1900 to arm new Endicott batteries elsewhere and to make room for the new batteries at Fort Stark; the 15-inch guns and Parrott rifles remained at least through the end of 1903. The forts were completed in 1905. Fort Stark had two 12-inch (305 mm) guns and two 6-inch (152 mm) guns, all on disappearing carriages, with four 3-inch (76 mm) guns to defend the minefield against minesweepers. Fort Foster had three 10-inch (254 mm) disappearing guns and two 3-inch guns. Fort Constitution had two 8-inch disappearing guns and two 3-inch guns.

=== World War I ===
The American entry into World War I brought many changes to the Coast Artillery and CD Portsmouth. As the only component of the Army with heavy artillery experience and significant manpower, the Coast Artillery was chosen to operate almost all US-manned heavy and railway artillery in that war. Stateside garrisons were drawn down to provide experienced gun crews on the Western Front. Some weapons were removed from forts with the intent of getting US-made artillery into the fight. 8-inch, 10-inch, and 12-inch guns and 12-inch mortars were converted to railway artillery, while 5-inch and 6-inch guns became field guns on wheeled carriages. However, few railway artillery pieces were mounted and few or none saw action before the Armistice. The remounted 5-inch and 6-inch guns were sent to France, but their units did not complete training in time to see action. All three 10-inch guns from Fort Foster, both 8-inch guns from Fort Constitution, and both 6-inch guns from Fort Stark were removed; after the war the 10-inch guns were returned, but the 6-inch guns were stored and the 8-inch guns probably became railway artillery. At all the forts, numerous temporary buildings were constructed to accommodate the large influx of new recruits. Camp Langdon (named for the Revolutionary War hero and originally the New Military Reservation) was established in New Castle due to insufficient space at the forts. References indicate the authorized strength of CD Portsmouth was 10 companies, including four from the New Hampshire National Guard.

=== Interwar ===
In 1920 a new mine casemate was built at Fort Constitution to replace the one at Fort Stark. On 1 July 1924 the harbor defense garrisons completed the transition from a company-based organization to a regimental one, and on 9 June 1925 the commands were renamed from "Coast Defenses..." to "Harbor Defenses...". The Harbor Defenses of Portsmouth (HD Portsmouth) appears to have been in caretaker status for most of the interwar period. Though most of the regiment was in the Harbor Defenses of Portland (Maine), the 8th Coast Artillery was also the Regular Army component of HD Portsmouth from 1 July 1924 through early 1940, when the new 22nd Coast Artillery assumed that duty; there does not appear to have been a National Guard harbor defense regiment in the area. Camp Langdon received a battery of two fixed antiaircraft guns in 1920; these were probably the 3-inch gun M1917 and were removed in the early 1930s.

=== World War II ===
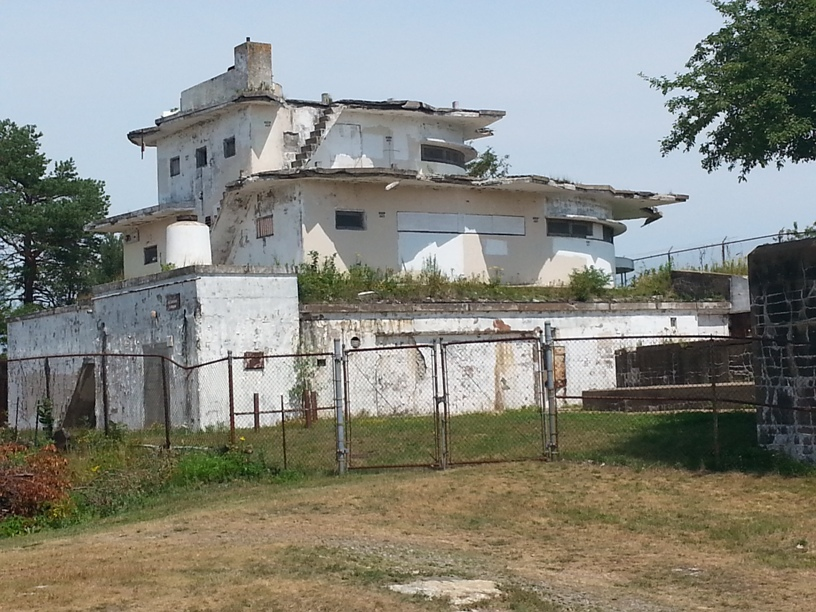
Harbor Entrance Control Post disguised as a mansion, added to Fort Stark in World War II.

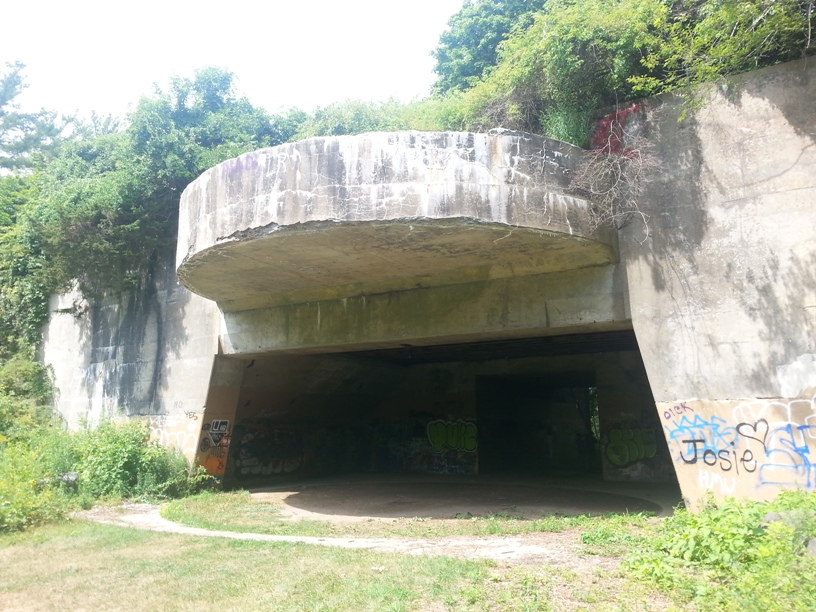
16-inch gun emplacement, Battery Seaman, Fort Dearborn.

Early in World War II numerous temporary buildings were again constructed to accommodate the rapid mobilization of men and equipment. Camp Langdon became the headquarters of HD Portsmouth, probably for reasons of space. After the Fall of France in 1940 the Army decided to replace all existing heavy coast defense guns with new batteries of 16-inch (406 mm) guns. Fort Dearborn was built in the town of Rye from April 1942 to September 1944, its main armament being Battery Seaman (a.k.a. Battery 103) with two 16-inch guns. Early in 1942 the fort was temporarily armed with four 155 mm guns on towed mounts, placed on circular concrete "Panama mounts". Battery 204 with two 6-inch guns on long-range carriages was constructed at the same time as Battery Seaman; the similar Battery 205 at Fort Foster was built but not armed. Battery Seaman replaced all previous heavy guns in the area; these were scrapped by 1945. Two Anti-Motor Torpedo Boat (AMTB) batteries were also emplaced, one near Fort Dearborn at Pulpit Rock (Battery 951) and Fort Foster (Battery 952); each of these had an authorized strength of four 90 mm guns (two on fixed mounts, two on towed mounts) and two 40 mm Bofors guns. The guns were dual-purpose, able to fire against air or surface targets. A new fire control tower and mine casemate were built at Fort Foster to supplement Fort Constitution's minefield facilities. An unusual combined Army-Navy harbor entrance control post/harbor defense command post was built atop the disarmed 6-inch battery at Fort Stark; it was designed to resemble a modern luxury beach cottage. With greatly reduced manpower requirements, the 22nd Coast Artillery was dissolved on 1 March 1944, with some personnel reassigned to HD Portsmouth. The remaining elements were moved to Camp Hood, Texas for inactivation by reassigning their personnel to five field artillery battalions. Another, less detailed source states the regiment was dissolved on 7 October 1944.

An outlying 4-gun 155 mm battery was at the Salisbury Beach Military Reservation, just over the state line in Salisbury, Massachusetts. The battery was initially part of the Harbor Defenses of Boston, but was transferred to HD Portsmouth with the construction of a fire control station for Fort Dearborn.

Numerous fire control towers and other structures were built from Kennebunkport, Maine to Cape Ann, Massachusetts to support HD Portsmouth, particularly the 16-inch guns at Fort Dearborn.

The US Navy also participated in defending the Portsmouth area with net defenses and submarine-detecting indicator loops, including a station on Appledore Island in the Isles of Shoals (Station 1G).

Following mobilization in 1940 HD Portsmouth was subordinate to First Army. On 24 December 1941 the Eastern Theater of Operations (renamed the Eastern Defense Command three months later) was established, with all east coast harbor defense commands subordinate to it, along with antiaircraft and fighter assets. This command was disestablished in 1946.

=== Post World War II ===
Following the war, it was soon determined that gun defenses were obsolete, and they were scrapped by the end of 1948, with remaining harbor defense functions turned over to the Navy. In 1950 the Coast Artillery Corps and all Army harbor defense commands were dissolved. Today the Air Defense Artillery carries the lineage of some Coast Artillery units.

== Present ==
The forts of the Portsmouth area are unusually well-preserved and publicly accessible, and include many features of US fort construction 1808–1945 in a geographically compact area. All except Fort Constitution are in public parks, and that fort is also open to the public. The only large battery that is partially buried is Battery Bolden, the 10-inch gun battery at Fort Foster. Most of the other batteries are fenced off, or with interior access otherwise impeded, but are visible and reasonably free of overgrowth. Fort Constitution is on a Coast Guard station but is publicly accessible, along with the adjacent lighthouse. Most of the fort is intact as rebuilt in 1808 (except the demolished north front); the incomplete third system walls remain; the Endicott 8-inch batteries are fenced off but visible. Fort McClary's blockhouse is well-preserved and interpreted; remnants of the abortive third system additions can be seen, including large piles of granite blocks, a mostly-complete bastion, and a small caponier in the seawall. The site of Fort Washington is now a water treatment plant, but some earthworks remain. Fort Stark has a small museum in an outbuilding, the unusual harbor entrance post, and well-preserved batteries. Fort Dearborn is now Odiorne Point State Park, which includes the Seacoast Science Center; the 16-inch gun battery is a 3/4-mile walk from the parking area. Fort Foster Park has a public beach, a rare World War II mine casemate with air conditioning on top, and two fire control towers. Several additional fire control towers remain on the New Hampshire seacoast. After being used through 1964 as a National Guard camp and rehab center for released inmates of the Portsmouth Naval Prison, Camp Langdon is now Great Island Common, a park for the town of New Castle; only the three 3-inch AA gun emplacements remain. The Pulpit Rock Base-End Station (N. 142) is on the National Register of Historic Places, no. 10000188.

== Coat of arms ==
- Blazon
  - Shield: Gyronny of eight azure and gules, a three-bastioned fort voided argent.
  - Crest: On a wreath of the colors a ship gules flagged proper in stocks argent, from the seal of the state of New Hampshire.
  - Motto: We are one.
- Symbolism: The field is taken from one of the two earliest New Hampshire flags known to exist, that of the 2nd New Hampshire Regiment of the Continental Army in the Revolutionary War. (This flag bears in the upper comer next to the staff, eight triangles, alternately red and blue, so arranged as to form two crosses, one upright and the other diagonal.) The field commemorates the capture, on December 14–15, 1774, of Fort William and Mary (now Fort Constitution) by the colonial Americans of New Hampshire, said to be the first American victory of the Revolutionary War. The three bastions of the fort are used as a charge, representing the three forts of the harbor defenses, Fort Constitution, New Hampshire, at chief, Fort Foster, Maine, dexter base, Fort Stark, New Hampshire, sinister base. The fact that the three forts are represented as bastions joined by curtain wallsso as to form a single fort signifies their union in the Harbor Defenses of Portsmouth and the close cooperation of the three in the common defense of Portsmouth. The motto, "We are One," taken from the old flag mentioned in connection with the field, also alludes to this union and cooperation. The ship on the stocks, used as a crest, is taken from the seal of the State of New Hampshire, of which seal it is the most prominent feature. Its significance lies in the fact that the Harbor Defenses of Portsmouth defend the only port in the state. Its tincture, red, is that of the Coast Artillery Corps, the combatant arm manning the defenses.

== See also ==
- Seacoast defense in the United States
- Harbor Defense Command
- List of coastal fortifications of the United States
