= Fort Foster (Kittery, Maine) =

Fort in Maine, United States

Fort Foster Park
- Kittery, York, Maine in United States
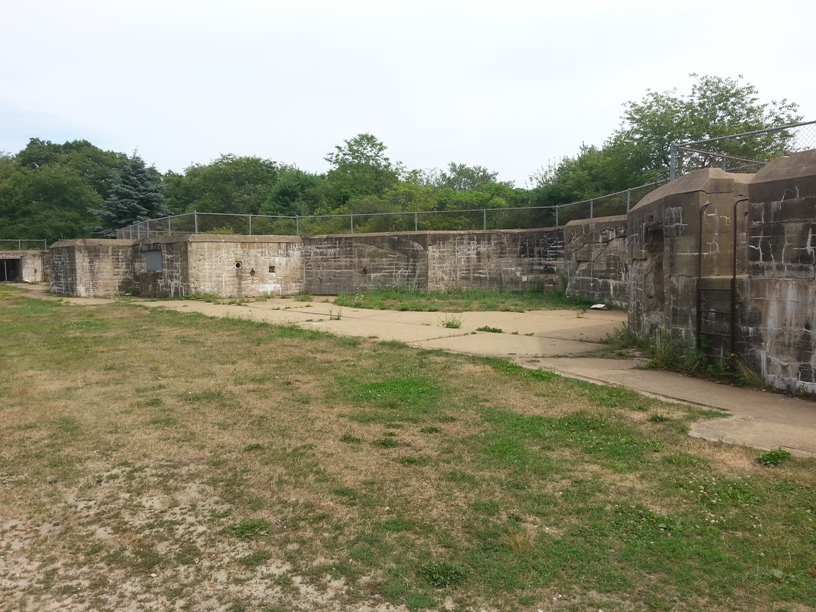
- 10-inch disappearing gun emplacement at Battery Bohlen, now mostly buried

Site information
- Type: Fort

Location
- Location in Maine
- Coordinates: 43°04′03″N 70°41′29″W
- Area: 88 acres (36 ha)

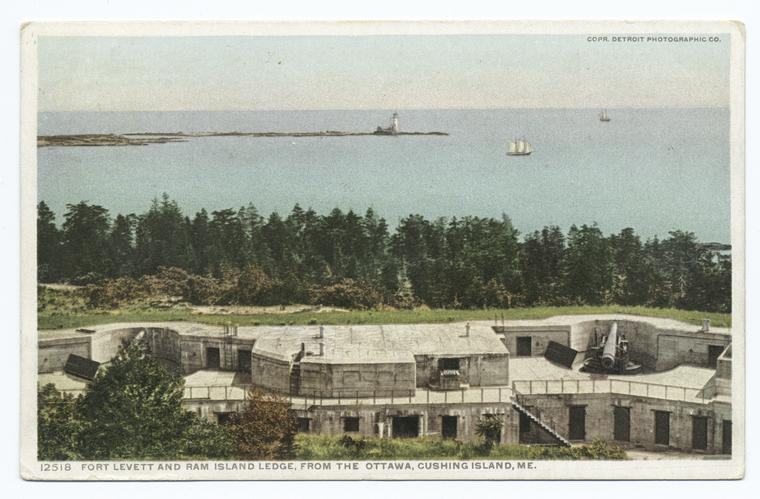
Two 10-inch (254 mm) disappearing gun emplacements, similar to those at Fort Foster.

Fort Foster, now part of Fort Foster Park, is a historic fort active 1901–1946 on the southwest tip of Gerrish Island in the Kittery Point area of Kittery, Maine. The park includes beaches and trails. Battery Bohlen and Battery Chapin were the major parts of the fort.

== History ==
The land was acquired by the U.S. federal government in 1872 and the fort was built from 1898 to 1901 as part of the large-scale Endicott Program. Other forts of this era in the Coast Defenses of Portsmouth included Fort Constitution and Fort Stark. The site was a sub-post of Fort Constitution and was named for American Civil War-era Brevet Major General John G. Foster of New Hampshire.

Fort Foster originally had two gun batteries: Battery Bohlen with three 10-inch (254 mm) M1895 disappearing guns and Battery Chapin with two 3-inch (76 mm) M1902 guns on pedestal mounts. Battery Bohlen was built in 1898-1901 and Battery Chapin was completed in 1904. Battery Bohlen was named for Brigadier General Henry Bohlen, killed in the Civil War, and Battery Chapin was named for Brigadier General Edward Chapin, also killed in the Civil War. In 1909 a secondary control station for an underwater minefield in the harbor was added; Battery Chapin was built primarily to defend this minefield against minesweepers.

After the American entry into World War I in early 1917, many guns were removed from coast defenses for potential service on the Western Front. Most of these weapons were not sent overseas or did not see action. All three 10-inch (254 mm) guns of Battery Bohlen were removed for potential use as railway artillery in October 1917, and were returned to the fort in September 1919.

During World War II Fort Foster's heavy guns were superseded by a new 16-inch (406 mm) gun battery at Fort Dearborn. The 10-inch guns of Battery Bohlen were scrapped in 1942. However, new construction also took place at Fort Foster as part of the general improvement of US coast defenses that began in 1940. In 1940 to 1944 the Harbor Defenses of Portsmouth were garrisoned by the 22nd Coast Artillery Regiment. A new mine control station and mine casemate were built near the former 10-inch battery, along with two new gun batteries at a different location. Battery 205, begun in 1942, was to have two 6-inch (152 mm) M1 guns on shielded barbette carriages with a bunker for ammunition and fire control, but construction was suspended in 1944 and the battery was never armed. A six-story fire control tower was constructed to spot targets for this battery. Anti-Motor Torpedo Boat Battery (AMTB) 952 was also built at Fort Foster in 1943, with an authorized strength of two fixed 90 mm guns and two towed 90 mm guns.

The remaining batteries were deactivated in 1946 and the fort was closed in 1948. The site was used as a recreation area for Portsmouth Naval Shipyard personnel from then until the 1950s. It was transferred to the Town of Kittery's Public Works Department and later expanded by another land purchase.

== Present ==
The buildings are closed except the Mine Observation Tower, now a public restroom. An admission fee is charged for access. There are swimming beaches and views of the entrance to Portsmouth Harbor, Whaleback Light, Portsmouth Harbor Light and Fort Constitution.

== Gallery ==
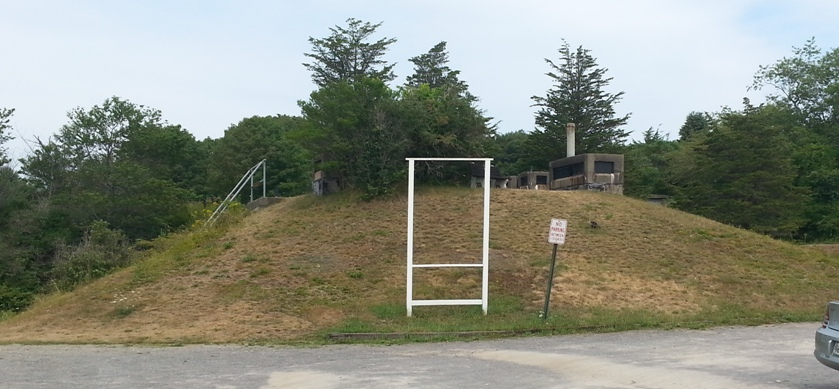
Mine casemate built in World War II

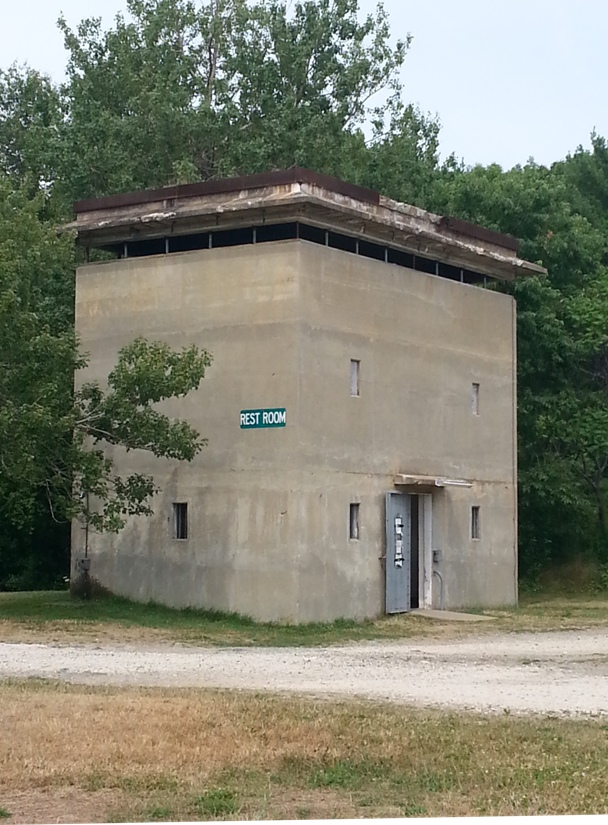
Mine control station built in World War II

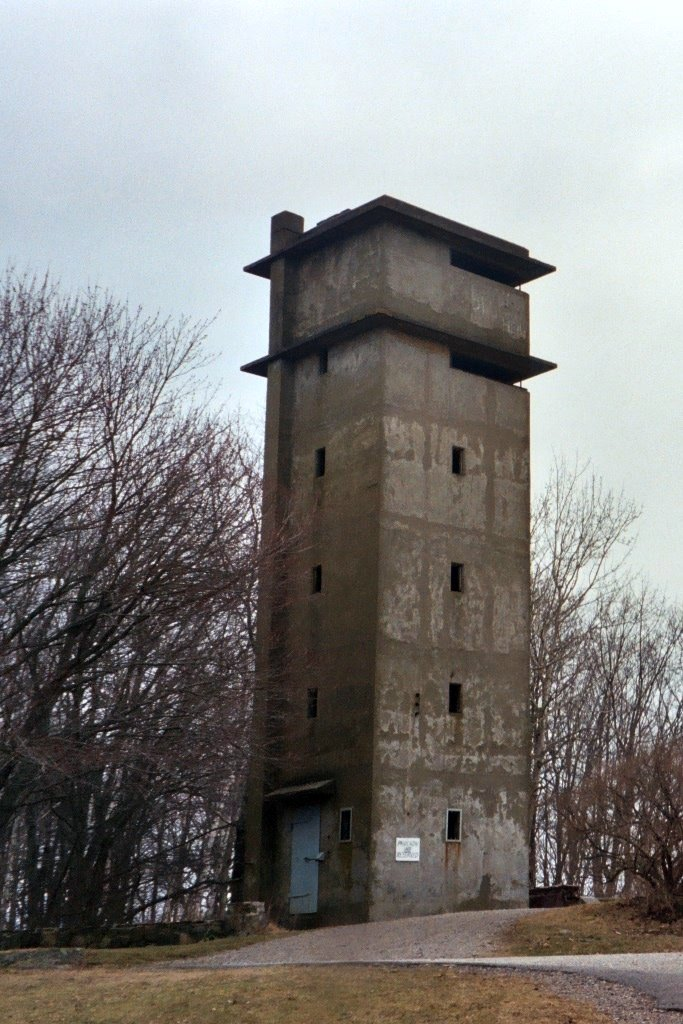
World War II-era observation and fire control tower for Battery 205

== See also ==
- Harbor Defense Command
- Seacoast defense in the United States
- United States Army Coast Artillery Corps
