= Fort William and Mary =

- Fort Constitution
- U.S. National Register of Historic Places
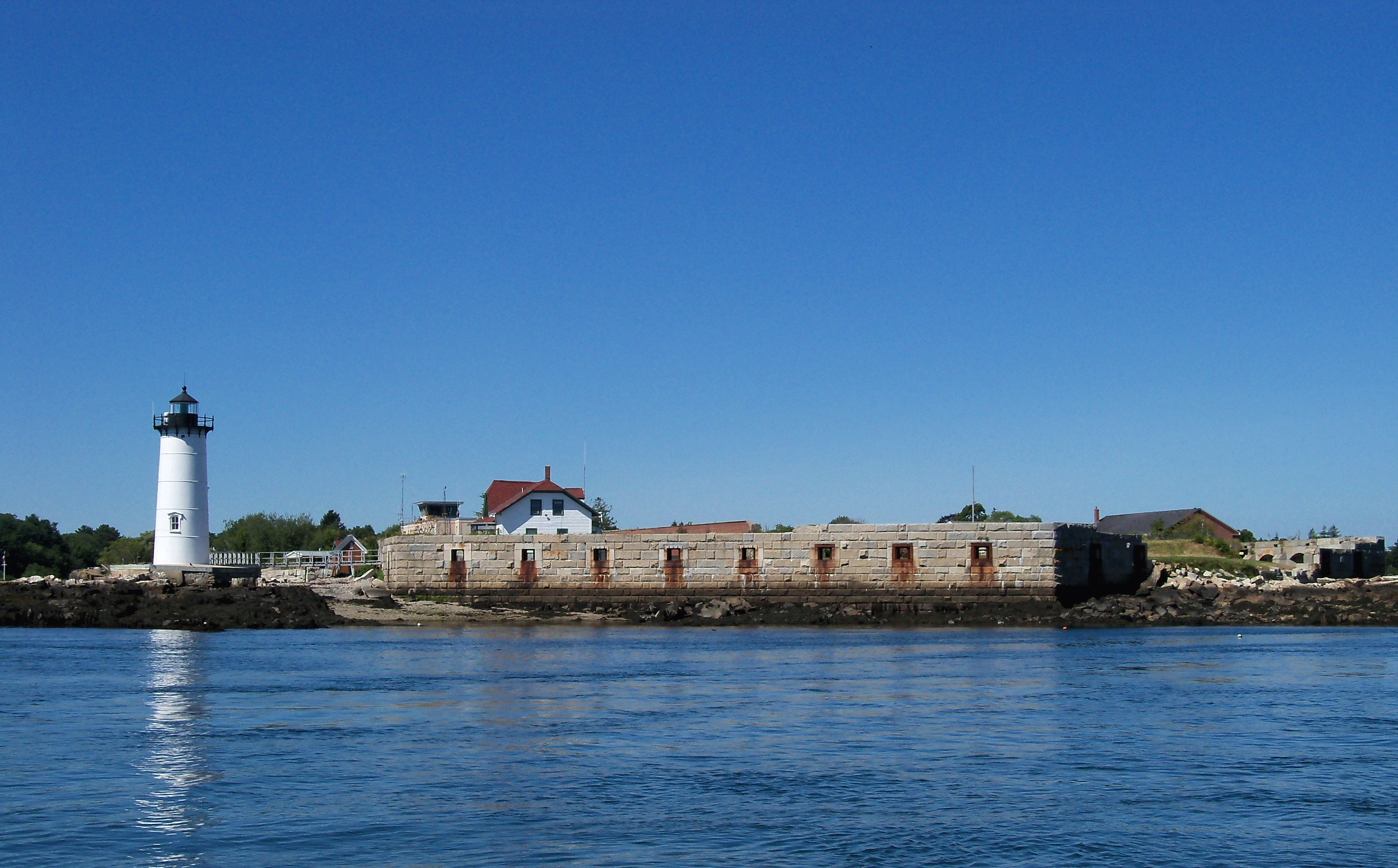

- Location within New Hampshire Location within the United States
- Location: New Castle, New Hampshire
- Coordinates: 43°04′17″N 70°42′34″W
- Built: Early 17th century
- NRHP reference No.: 73000169
- Added to NRHP: July 09, 1973

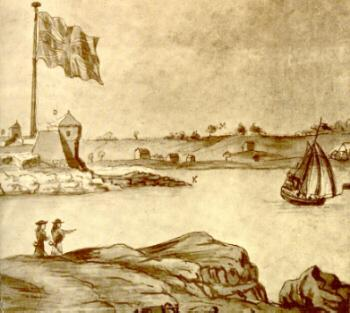
Fort William and Mary in 1705 (inset)

Fort William and Mary was a colonial-era British fortress on the island of New Castle, at the mouth of the Piscataqua River in the Province of New Hampshire. Originally known as "The Castle," it was renamed Fort William and Mary circa 1692, after the accession of William III and Mary II to the British throne. During the American Revolutionary War (1775–1783) it was captured by rebel forces, recaptured, and later abandoned by the British. Following an 1808 rebuilding in response to increasing British hostilities, it was renamed Fort Constitution and served in the War of 1812. Another rebuilding and expansion was carried out in the wake of the Spanish-American War in 1899. The fort served actively through the first half of the 20th century and World War II.

Fort Constitution was given to the State of New Hampshire by the American military in 1961 and converted into a state park. Listed on the National Register of Historic Places in 1973, it is open to the public.

== Colonial period ==
Erected by local colonial forces prior to 1632, the original fortress reported directly to the royal governor of the Province of New Hampshire and guarded access to the harbor at Portsmouth. It was manned by provincial troops and served as the colony's main munitions depot and seaport.

In 1665, the Carr-Cartwright Commission visited New Hampshire to evaluate the governance of the province. In their report, they recommended substantial improvements, especially in light of the Second Anglo-Dutch War which started that year. These improvements were funded by the towns of Dover and Portsmouth.

Richard Cutt, brother of John Cutt, was the first commander of the newly renovated fort and infantry company by order of the Massachusetts General Court in 1673. Elias Stileman was his lieutenant. He replaced Cutt when the latter died in 1676.

In 1683, Governor Edward Cranfield fired longtime commander Captain Elias Stileman and replaced him with Walter Barefoote. In the aftermath of Gove's Rebellion, Edward Gove was held there awaiting transportation to Boston and eventually the Tower of London. He complained of the treatment he received from Barefoote.

Colonel Shadrach Walton commanded the fort during different periods at the end of the 17th and beginning of the 18th century.

In 1705, the fort was inspected by military architect Wolfgang William Romer who suggested several improvements that were not acted upon.

The fort also served to protect Kittery on the opposite shore of the harbor, now in the state of Maine, but then part of the Province of Massachusetts Bay. The Kittery side of the harbor was raided numerous times by the tribes of the Wabanaki Confederacy during the French and Indian Wars (1753–1763).

In 1770, John Cochran accepted the post of commander of the fort from Governor John Wentworth.

== American Revolution ==
In 1774, it was the only permanently occupied military post in New Hampshire.

=== 1774 raids ===
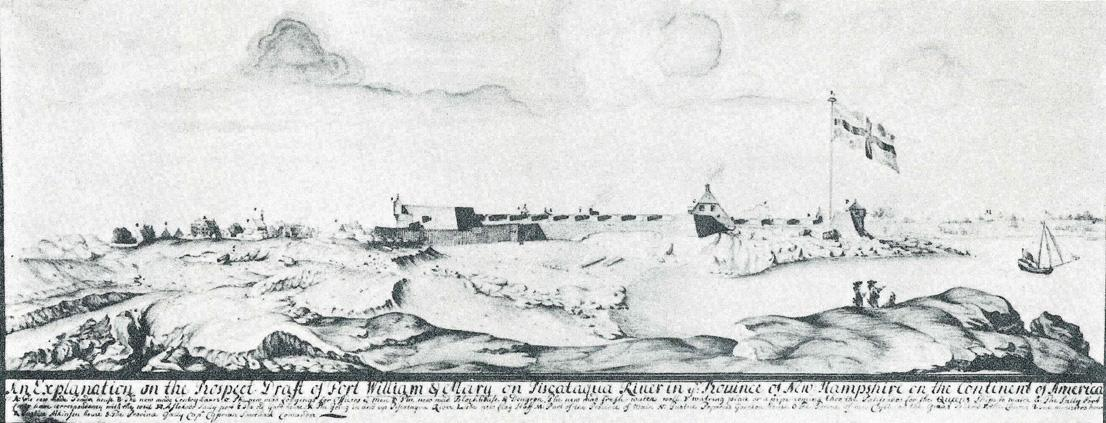
Fort William and Mary sketch by Wolfgang William Romer (1705)

On December 14, 1774, local Patriots from the Portsmouth area, led by local political leader and rebel activist John Langdon, stormed the post (overcoming a six-man caretaker detachment) and seized the garrison's gunpowder supply, which was distributed to local militia through several New Hampshire towns for potential use in the looming struggle against Great Britain. On the following day, rebels led by colonial military officer John Sullivan again raided the fort, this time seizing with greater effort numerous heavy cannon, ammunition and supplies.

== Fort Constitution ==
Following the Revolution, the fort was called "Castle Fort" or "Fort Castle". The new state of New Hampshire gave the ground around Fort Point, on which the old fort stood, to the federal government in 1791. In 1800, the Portsmouth Naval Shipyard was established upriver on Fernald's Island (now part of Seavey's Island), and the fort was rebuilt under the Second System of U.S. coastal defense fortifications. Brick masonry walls were doubled in height, and new brick buildings were added inside. Work was completed in 1808 and the defense renamed "Fort Constitution". On July 4, 1809, an accidental explosion marred Independence Day / Fourth of July celebrations at the fort, killing a number of soldiers and civilians. The U.S. Secretary of War's December 1811 report on fortifications described Fort Constitution as "an enclosed irregular work of masonry, mounting 36 heavy guns... (with) brick barracks for two companies..." During the War of 1812 the fort was occupied and expanded with Walbach Tower, a Martello tower with a single 32-pounder cannon, being built in 1814, just before the conflict ended.

Over four decades later, during the American Civil War (1861–1865), Fort Constitution was projected to be rebuilt as a three-tiered granite fort under the new expanded, more formidable Third System of U.S. coastal defense fortifications. However, advances in weaponry, particularly the development and use of armored, steam-powered warships with heavy rifled guns, rendered the masonry walls design obsolete before they were finished. The fort's construction was abandoned in 1867 following the Civil War with the older now-obsolete Second System fort still largely intact and two walls from the revised expanded Third System cut short, built around parts of it. At some point in the Civil War era, four 100-pounder (6.4-inch, 163 mm) Parrott guns were mounted at the fort, and remained there at least through late 1903.

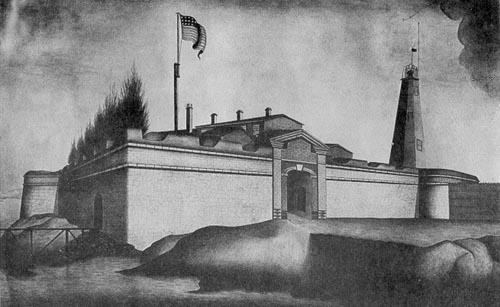
Fort Constitution in the 19th century

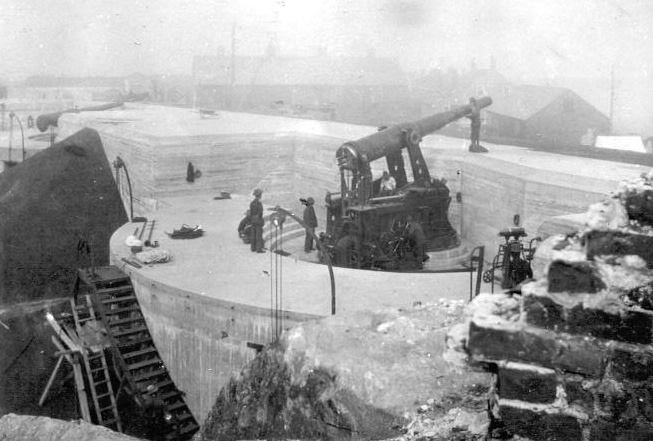
Battery Farnsworth, 8-inch (203 mm) M1888 disappearing gun emplacement, Fort Constitution, 1905

In the mid-1890s the United States War Department's Board of Fortifications launched large-scale improvements of seacoast fortifications known as the Endicott Program. Construction began on Battery Farnsworth in 1897, part of the larger surrounding Coast Defenses of Portsmouth, that included nearby Fort Stark and Fort Foster in Kittery opposite the harbor mouth to the north. Sited below the hill on which the ruins of the former Walbach Tower of 1814 stand, the reinforced-concrete installation was built partly below ground in a deep trench as the new protective style required. It featured two 8-inch (203 mm) M1888 guns on recently developed disappearing carriages.

Named for Union Army Brigadier General Elon J. Farnsworth (1837–1863), killed at the Battle of Gettysburg during the Civil War, the battery was completed in 1899, a year after the successful conclusion of the Spanish-American War.

It was joined in 1904 by the construction of adjacent Battery Hackleman, built primarily to defend a newly created underwater minefield against enemy minesweepers. Named for Union General Pleasant A. Hackleman, it had two 3-inch (76 mm) M1903 guns on pedestal mounts.

The pair of fortifications were similar to numerous other Endicott-style defenses built during the late 1890s and early 1900s on river mouths, harbors, and bays outside of major cities along the Eastern Seaboard and Gulf of Mexico.

After the American entry into World War I in April 1917, many guns were removed from coast defenses for shipment across the Atlantic Ocean to potential service on the Western Front. Both 8-inch guns of Battery Farnsworth were removed in October 1917 for use as railway artillery. In 1920 a mine casemate was built next to Battery Farnsworth to replace a similar facility at nearby Fort Stark.

During World War II (1939/1941-1945), Battery Hackleman's 3-inch guns were sent to a new battery of the same name further south at Fort H. G. Wright on Fisher's Island, New York. They were replaced by two 3-inch (76 mm) M1902 guns taken from Battery Hays (named for Union Army General Alexander Hays, killed at the Civil War Battle of the Wilderness) at Fort Stark. In 1940–1944 the Harbor Defenses of Portsmouth were garrisoned by the 22nd Coast Artillery Regiment of the U.S. Army, and a mine observation station was built atop Battery Farnsworth. Following the surrender of the Axis powers, Battery Hackleman was disarmed by 1948 and the fort was turned over to the Coast Guard. Battery Hackleman was eventually demolished, but Battery Farnsworth can still be seen as part of the subsequent state park.

The Fort Constitution site was given back to the State of New Hampshire by the American military in 1961 and turned into a state park. It was listed on the National Register of Historic Places in 1973. As of 2025 the park is temporarily closed.

== The lighthouse ==
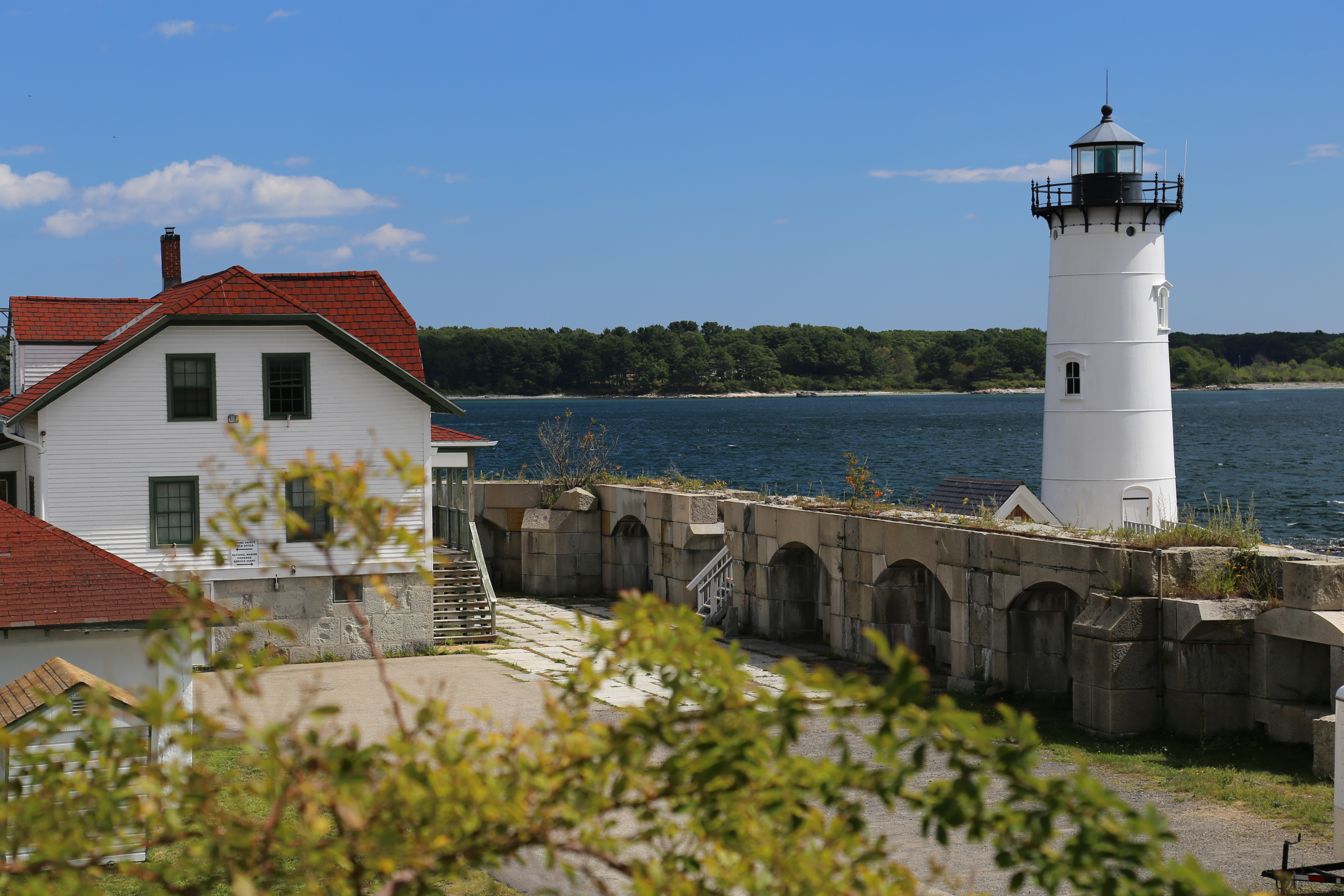
Fort Constitution and the Portsmouth Harbor Light, 2016

The fort has been home to a lighthouse since 1771. The current installation, the Portsmouth Harbor Light, was completed in 1878. Its Fourth Order Fresnel lens remains a valuable aid to navigation. The tower and the grounds immediately around it are open for scheduled tours.

== See also ==
- Seacoast defense in the United States
- United States Army Coast Artillery Corps
- 8th Coast Artillery (United States)
- National Register of Historic Places listings in Rockingham County, New Hampshire
- New Hampshire Historical Marker No. 4: William & Mary Raids
