= Fort Stark =

Park in New Hampshire, US

Fort Stark Historic Site
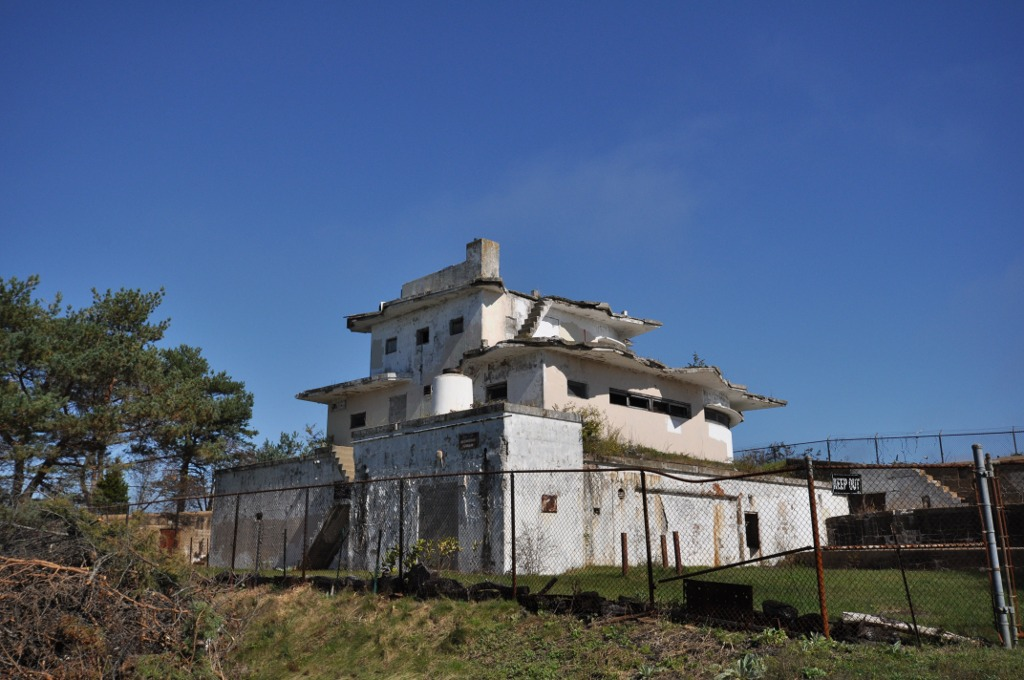
- 1944 Harbor Entrance Control Post (HECP). Originally disguised as a "modernistic building" and painted white in the early 1960s.

- Location within New Hampshire
- Location: New Castle, New Hampshire, United States
- Coordinates: 43°03′27″N 70°42′46″W
- Area: 10 acres (4.0 ha)
- Established: 1978
- Administrator: New Hampshire Division of Parks and Recreation
- Website: Official website
- New Hampshire State Parks

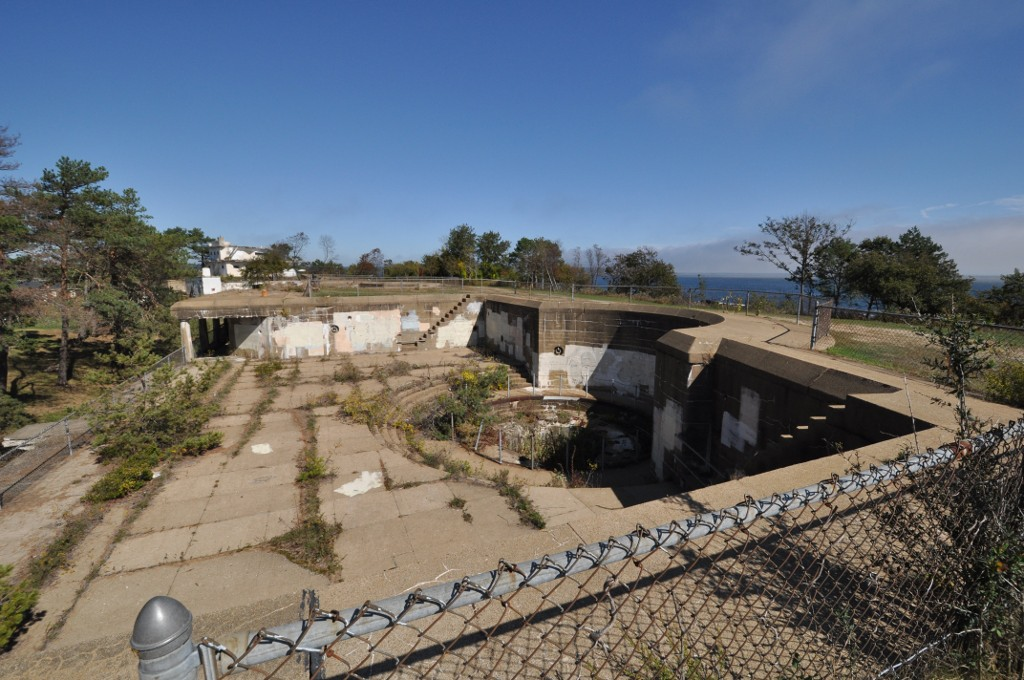
12-inch (305 mm) disappearing gun emplacement, Battery Hunter

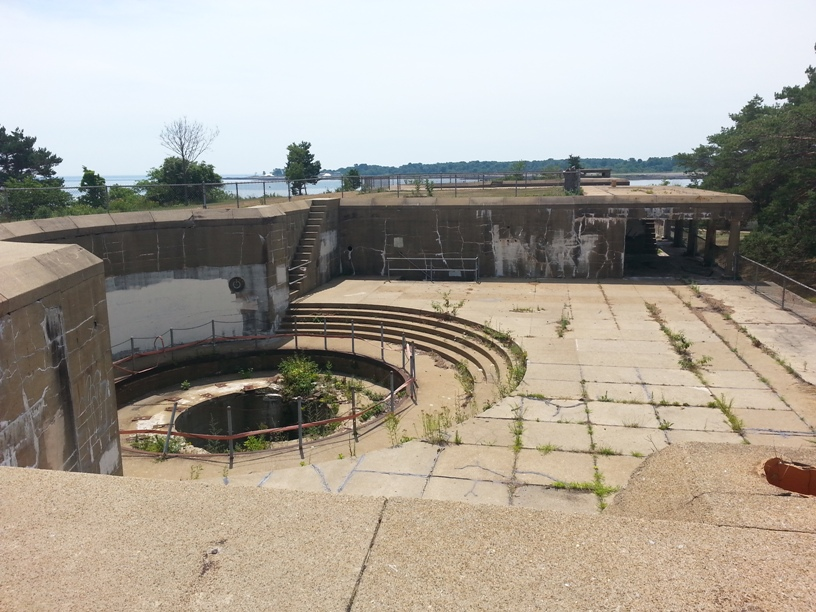
Another view of a 12-inch (305 mm) disappearing gun emplacement

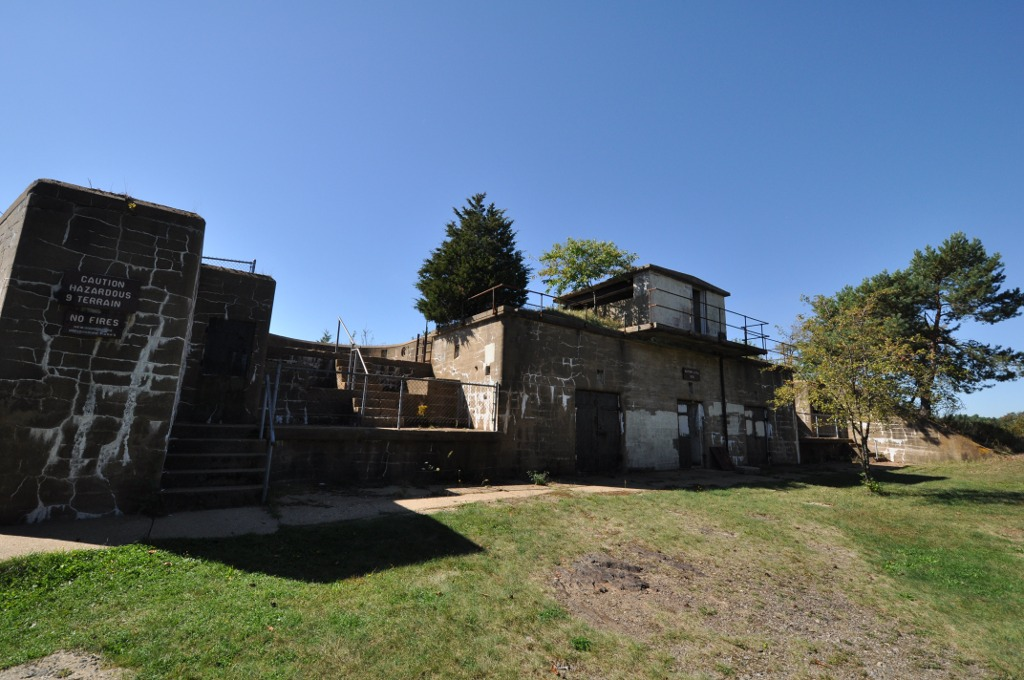
Old Battery Lytle, two 3-inch (76 mm) guns

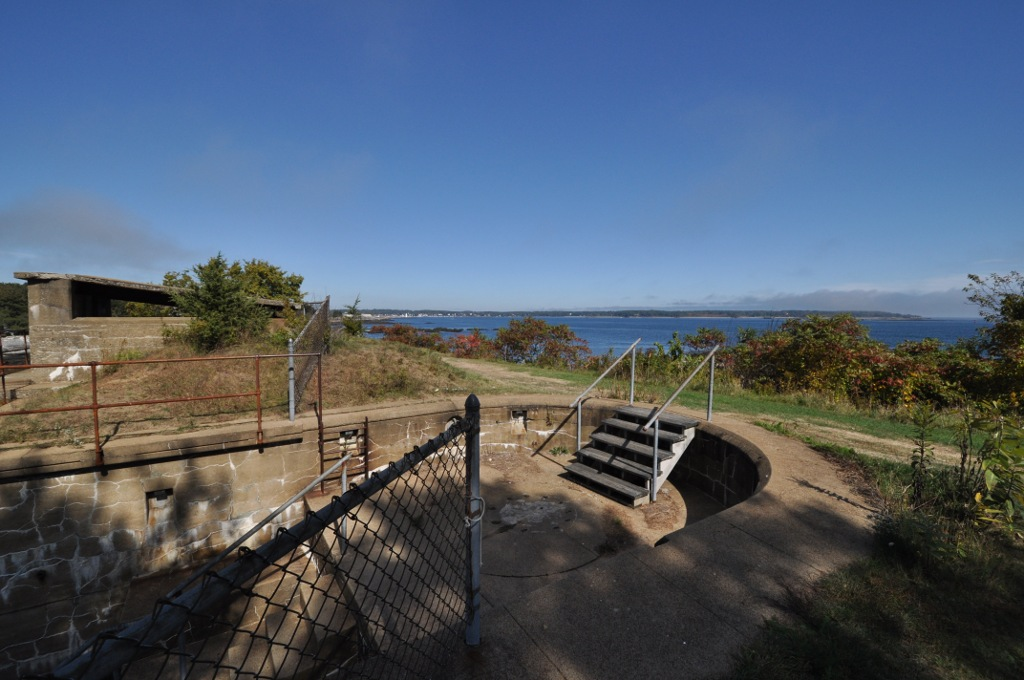
3-inch (76 mm) gun emplacement

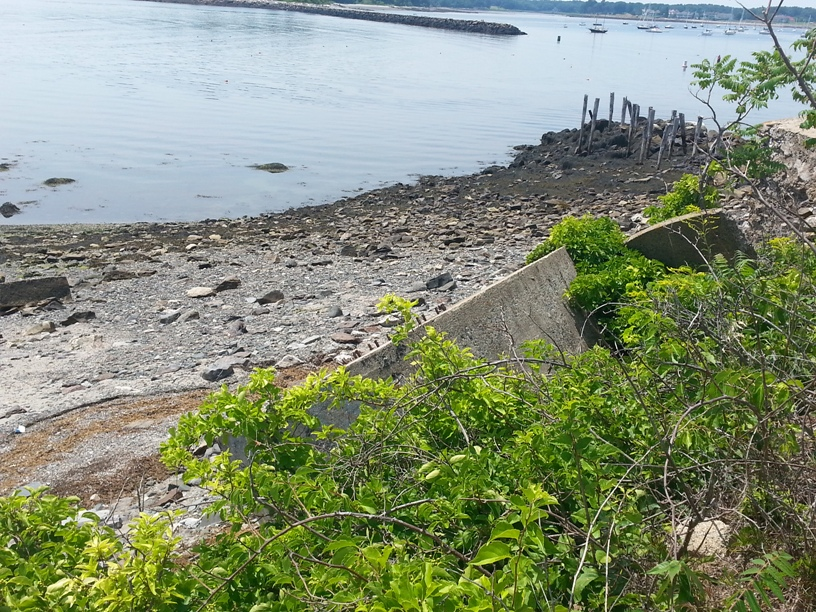
3-inch (76 mm) emplacement of New Battery Lytle, Fort Stark, New Hampshire, following erosion damage. This battery was a wartime expedient and consisted only of two concrete pads.

Fort Stark is a former military fortification in New Castle, New Hampshire, United States. Located at Jerry's Point (also called Jaffrey's Point) on the southeastern tip of New Castle Island, most of the surviving fort was developed in the early 20th century, following the Spanish–American War, although there were several earlier fortifications on the site, portions of which survive. The fort was named for John Stark, a New Hampshire officer who distinguished himself at the Battle of Bennington in the American Revolution. The purpose of Fort Stark was to defend the harbor of nearby Portsmouth and the Portsmouth Naval Shipyard. The fort remained in active use through the Second World War, after which it was used for reserve training by the US Navy. The property was partially turned over to the state of New Hampshire in 1979, which established Fort Stark Historic Site, and the remainder of the property was turned over in 1983. The grounds are open to the public during daylight hours.

== History ==
=== 18th century ===
The site of the present Fort Stark was first fortified in 1746 as Battery Cumberland, with nine 32-pounder cannon. It was rebuilt in 1775 for the American Revolution, but the guns (two 32-pounders and six 24-pounders) were soon removed to arm other forts in the area. Several of the guns captured at nearby Fort William and Mary were used to rearm this fort in September 1775. The fort was garrisoned until 1778 and is one of several forts in the area that may have been named Fort Hancock during the Revolution. In 1794 a new battery for nine guns was built on the site as part of the First System of US fortifications; the remains of a circular stone redoubt excavated in 1982, probably this one, can be seen in front of Battery Hunter.

=== 19th century ===
During the War of 1812 a company of 120 militiamen under Captain William Marshall garrisoned the redoubt. The guns at this time were a mix of 6-pounder and 9-pounder weapons. The redoubt was abandoned soon after the war ended in 1815.

Plans were drawn up in 1861 for a large stone fort on the site, part of the Third System of fortifications, but the fort was never built. In 1873, the United States acquired the property as part of a modernization of seacoast defenses. The stone forts of the Civil War and earlier had been shown to be vulnerable to rifled cannon in that war, and new defenses centered on earthworks were planned. After modifying the plan for reduced cost in 1874, earthworks for eight 15-inch (381 mm) Rodman smoothbore guns were planned as the "Battery at Jerry's Point", with an additional three "heavy guns" in the old redoubt. However, funding was cut off in 1876 with the new battery about two-thirds complete. Minor construction occurred in 1879 and 1885–1886, but it appears the battery was never armed. A small portion of it can still be seen. In 1887 the Jerry's Point Lifesaving Station was built on the west side of the site, which remained in service until 1908 when the Portsmouth Harbor Lifesaving Station was built on Wood Island near Fort Foster.

In 1885, the Endicott Board recommended a large-scale fortification plan that eventually included Fort Stark. However, construction on the new fort did not begin until 1901. In 1898, shortly after the outbreak of the Spanish–American War, emergency batteries were constructed to quickly arm key points, as most of the Endicott batteries were still years from completion and it was feared the Spanish fleet would bombard the US East Coast. At Jerry's Point this consisted of two 8-inch (203 mm) M1888 guns mounted on converted carriages built for Rodman guns in the 1870s emplacements. These guns were removed in 1900 to arm new Endicott batteries elsewhere and to make room for the new batteries at Fort Stark.

=== Endicott period ===
Construction began on the newly named Fort Stark in 1901 and was completed in 1905. Four batteries were originally built: Battery Hunter with two 12-inch (305 mm) M1895 guns on disappearing carriages, Battery Kirk with two 6-inch (152 mm) M1903 guns on disappearing carriages, and Batteries Hays and Lytle, each with two 3-inch (76 mm) M1902 guns on pedestal mounts. Battery Hunter was named for Major General David Hunter of the Civil War, Battery Kirk was named for Brigadier General Edward N. Kirk, Battery Hays was named for Major General Alexander Hays, and Battery Lytle was named for Brigadier General William Haines Lytle. Each of the last three were killed in action in the Civil War. Facilities for controlling an underwater minefield in the harbor were added in 1907-1909; Batteries Hays and Lytle were built primarily to defend this minefield against minesweepers. As with other US seacoast forts, Fort Stark was garrisoned by the United States Army Coast Artillery Corps. The fort was part of the Coast Defenses of Portsmouth (Harbor Defenses after 1925), along with Fort Foster and Fort Constitution.

=== World War I ===
After the American entry into World War I the two 6-inch (152 mm) guns of Battery Kirk were dismounted for use on the Western Front on field carriages. These guns were sent to France and returned to the United States after the war, but were not returned to Fort Stark. A history of the Coast Artillery in World War I states that none of the regiments in France equipped with 6-inch guns completed training in time to see action before the Armistice. In 1918 Battery Kirk was converted into the Post Telephone Switchboard room. The Mine Command station, built in 1909, was converted into the "H" Station in 1921 when the mine complex was moved to Fort Constitution.

=== World War II ===
In 1940-1944, the Harbor Defenses of Portsmouth were garrisoned by the 22nd Coast Artillery Regiment. In 1941 the former lifesaving station was occupied by the Navy and would become the Navy HECP. The "H" Station was occupied by the Army, who used it as a temporary HECP until 1944, when a new reinforced concrete structure was built on top of Battery Kirk that would house both the Army and Navy operations until 1948.

Although most of the heavy guns in the Portsmouth area were superseded by the new 16-inch (406 mm) gun battery at Fort Dearborn, Battery Hunter's 12-inch guns remained in service until February 1945, several months after the guns at Fort Dearborn entered service. The original Batteries Hays and Lytle were deactivated in 1942. Battery Hays' two 3-inch guns were sent to Battery Hackleman at Fort Constitution, while a new Battery Lytle was built just south of Battery Hunter, consisting of two concrete pads atop the 1870s earthworks. A 90 mm gun battery, called Anti-Motor Torpedo Boat Battery 953 (AMTB 953), was authorized for Fort Stark but not built.

=== Postwar ===
With all the guns scrapped, the fort was deactivated in 1948 and turned over to the Navy in 1950. The Navy used the fort for harbor defense purposes until 1953, when it became a reserve training center for a Mobile Inshore Undersea Warfare Unit until 1980. In 1963, two Navy 3-inch (76 mm) guns were placed on the "new" Battery Lytle's gun blocks as a memorial to USS Thresher (SSN-593), lost while operating from Portsmouth Naval Shipyard. Years later, one gun was returned to the shipyard, while the other gun was left derelict after a 1978 storm dislodged its mounting block. The fort is now a state park, with a small museum in the Visitors' Center that includes the remaining 3-inch gun. Visitors are welcome to view the gun batteries and HECP and enjoy the views of the Atlantic Ocean.

== See also ==
- Seacoast defense in the United States
- United States Army Coast Artillery Corps
