= Odiorne Point State Park =

Public recreation area in New Hampshire, U.S.

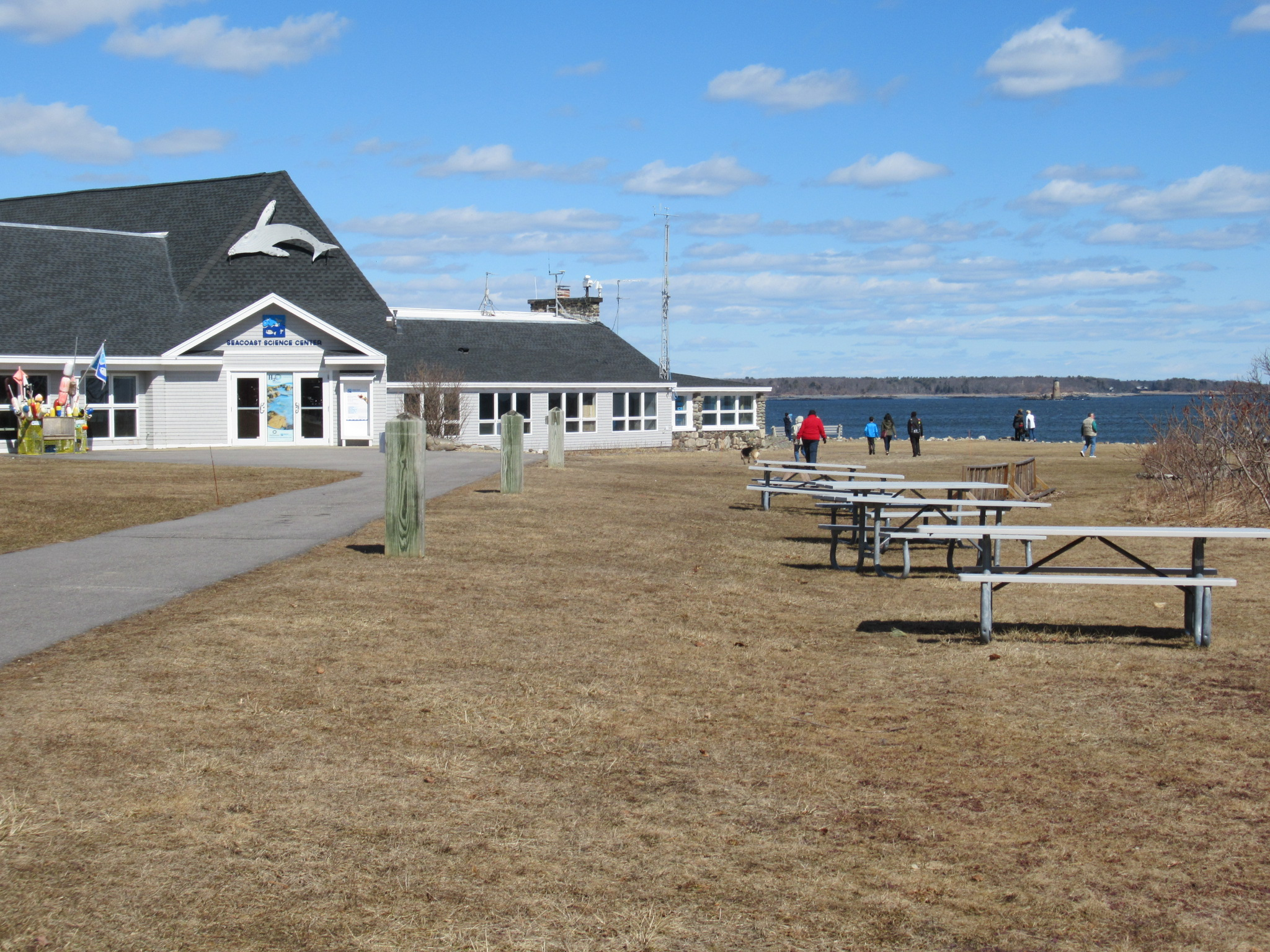
- Seacoast Science Center

- Location within New Hampshire
- Interactive map of Odiorne Point State Park
- Location: Rye, New Hampshire, United States
- Coordinates: 43°02′37″N 70°42′52″W
- Area: 135 acres (55 ha)
- Elevation: 10 feet (3.0 m)
- Established: 1961 (purchased); 1972 (opened)
- Administrator: New Hampshire Division of Parks and Recreation
- Website: Official website
- New Hampshire State Parks

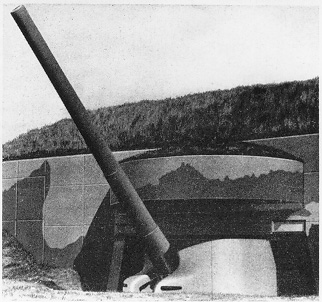
16-inch casemated gun, similar to those at Fort Dearborn

6-inch gun at Fort Columbia State Park, Washington state, similar to Battery 204

Odiorne Point State Park is a public recreation area located on the Atlantic seacoast in the town of Rye near Portsmouth, New Hampshire, in the United States. Among the park's features are the Seacoast Science Center and the remains of the World War II Fort Dearborn. The park offers opportunities for hiking, cycling, picnicking, fishing, and boating.

== History ==
The Council for New England issued a grant of 6,000 acres (24 km^{2}) and one island to David Thompson on 16 October 1622. Thompson transferred one quarter of this land to investors who equipped the ship Jonathan to sail from Plymouth carrying Thompson and several other men to establish a settlement in the Piscataqua River estuary. Odiorne Point was included in the land selected in the Spring of 1623. Their fortified settlement known as Piscataqua became a rendezvous point for early settlers of the Gulf of Maine.

Odiorne Point is the site of one of the Sunken Forests of New Hampshire. The point got its name from the Odiorne family, who settled on the land in the mid-1660s. The park is the site of the former Pannaway Plantation, the location of the first European settlement in New Hampshire, and is commemorated by a memorial in the park.

The park was the site of Fort Dearborn from 1942 to 1947. In 1961, the Federal government transferred 137 acres of the fort to the State for $91,000 with the restriction that the land be used for public recreation. Although little maintenance or improvement was done in the next ten years, once picnic areas and restroom facilities were constructed, the park opened in July 1972.

== Seacoast Science Center ==
The Seacoast Science Center is the primary facility in Odiorne Point State Park. Exhibits include aquariums, touch tanks, and whale skeletons. There is also a marine mammal rescue center. Indoor and outdoor programs on marine life and conservation are offered for school groups, families, adults, children, and other groups. The center also has environmental day camps up to 8th grade.

== Fort Dearborn ==
Prior to 1942, the site of the park was private, expensive oceanfront land. In 1942, during World War II, the site was condemned and purchased by the United States government for the construction of Fort Dearborn as part of an across-the-board modernization of US coast defenses. In 1961 the site was ceded to the state of New Hampshire; the previous owners were not given the opportunity to re-purchase the land.

The fort was named for Henry Dearborn, a major-general in the Revolutionary War and later Commanding General of the United States Army and Secretary of War. The fort was part of the Harbor Defenses of Portsmouth, New Hampshire, along with Fort Stark, Fort Constitution, and Fort Foster. In 1940-1944 the Harbor Defenses of Portsmouth were garrisoned by the 22nd Coast Artillery Regiment. The first battery at Fort Dearborn was called Battery Dearborn, and consisted of four 155 mm towed guns on "Panama mounts", which were circular concrete platforms. The platforms remain today.

Fort Dearborn was primarily acquired to build a battery of two 16-inch (406 mm) Mark IIMI ex-Navy guns, heavily protected by concrete and earth casemates. This was completed and test-fired in June 1944, and eventually superseded all other heavy guns in the Harbor Defenses of Portsmouth. It was initially called Battery 103 and later named Battery Seaman in honor of Colonel Claudius M. Seaman. The battery remains today. A Plotting, Switchboard, and Radio (PSR) bunker housing a plotting room as part of the Coast Artillery fire control system is to the west of Battery 103. A companion battery, Battery 204, consisted of two 6-inch (152 mm) M1 guns in shielded barbette mounts with a large bunker between them containing magazines and fire control facilities. This was also completed and test-fired in June 1944. The battery is near the Seacoast Science Center, and today has several 16-inch shells displayed. A similar 6-inch battery (Battery 205) was built at Fort Foster but not armed. Near Fort Dearborn at Pulpit Rock, short-range defense was provided by Anti-Motor Torpedo Boat Battery (AMTB) 951, consisting of four 90 mm guns, two on fixed mounts and two on towed mounts. A similar 90 mm battery, AMTB 952, was built at Fort Foster, and AMTB 953 was planned for Fort Stark but never built.

In 1948 Fort Dearborn was deactivated and all guns were scrapped. The Pulpit Rock Base-End Station (N. 142), just outside of the park's southern boundary, is on the National Register of Historic Places, no. 10000188.

== Rye Air Force Station ==
Part of Fort Dearborn was used as a radar station by the United States Air Force beginning in 1949, and in 1955 this became the Rye Air Force Station. This was an Air Defense Command radar site that also supported the nearby Pease Air Force Base of the Strategic Air Command. In 1957-59 Rye AFS was deactivated, but an unmanned "gap filler" radar remained active until 1968. Nothing remains of the Air Force installations.

== Gallery ==
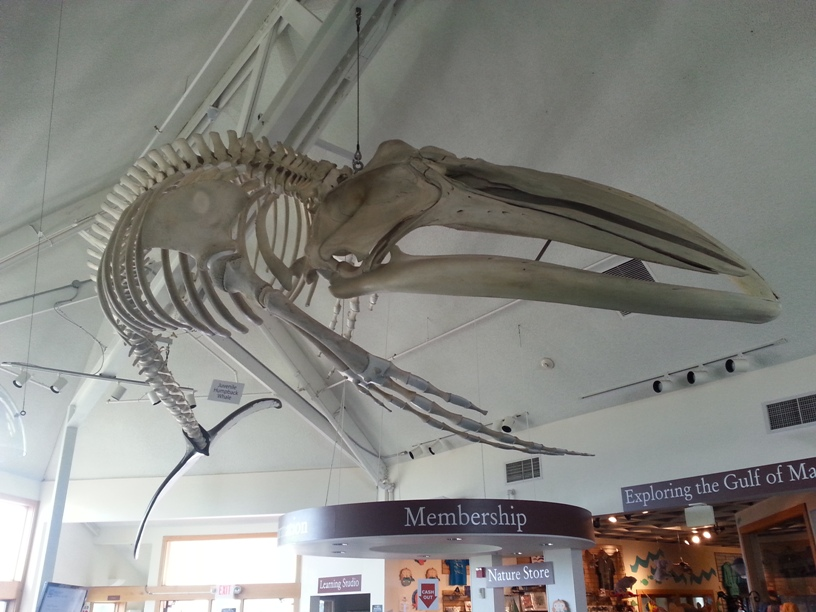
Juvenile humpback whale skeleton, inside the Seacoast Science Center

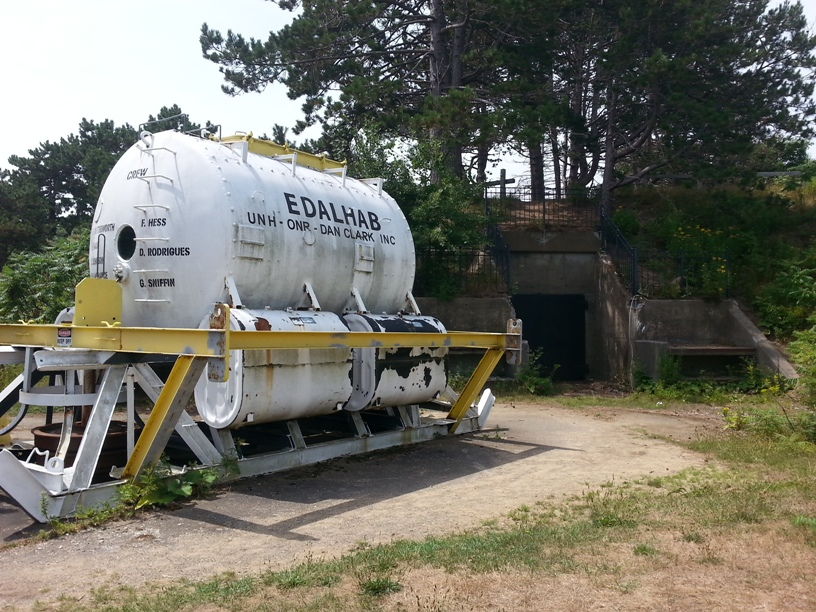
EDALHAB, an underwater habitat used for saturation diving experiments in Lake Winnipesaukee in the late 1960s, now located outside the Seacoast Science Center. Battery 204, a former 6-inch gun battery, is in the background.

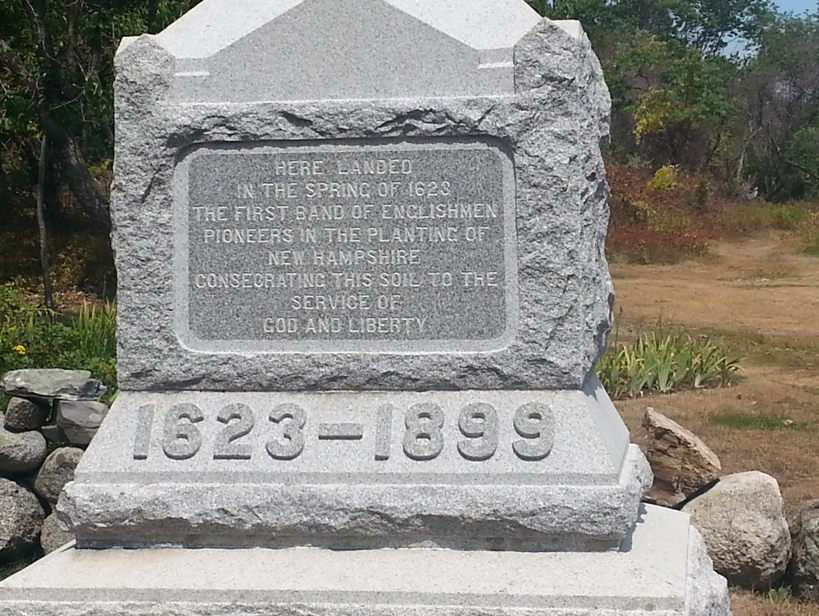
Memorial to the landing of the first English settlers at Odiorne Point

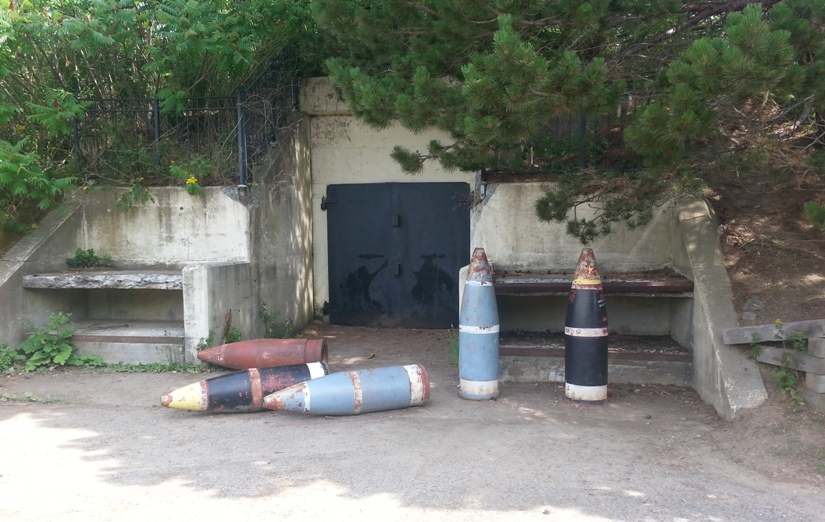
16-inch shells at a 6-inch gun emplacement, Battery 204, Fort Dearborn, near the Seacoast Science Center

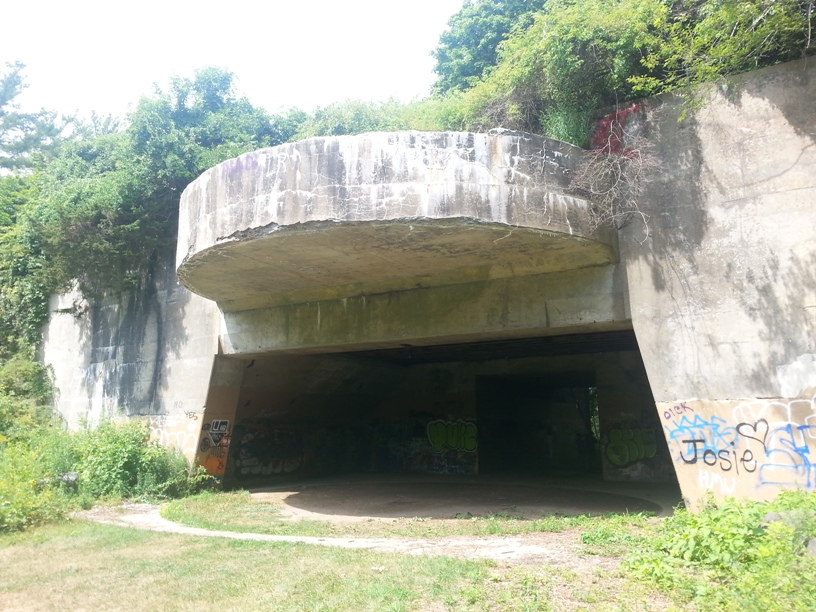
16-inch gun emplacement, Battery Seaman, Fort Dearborn

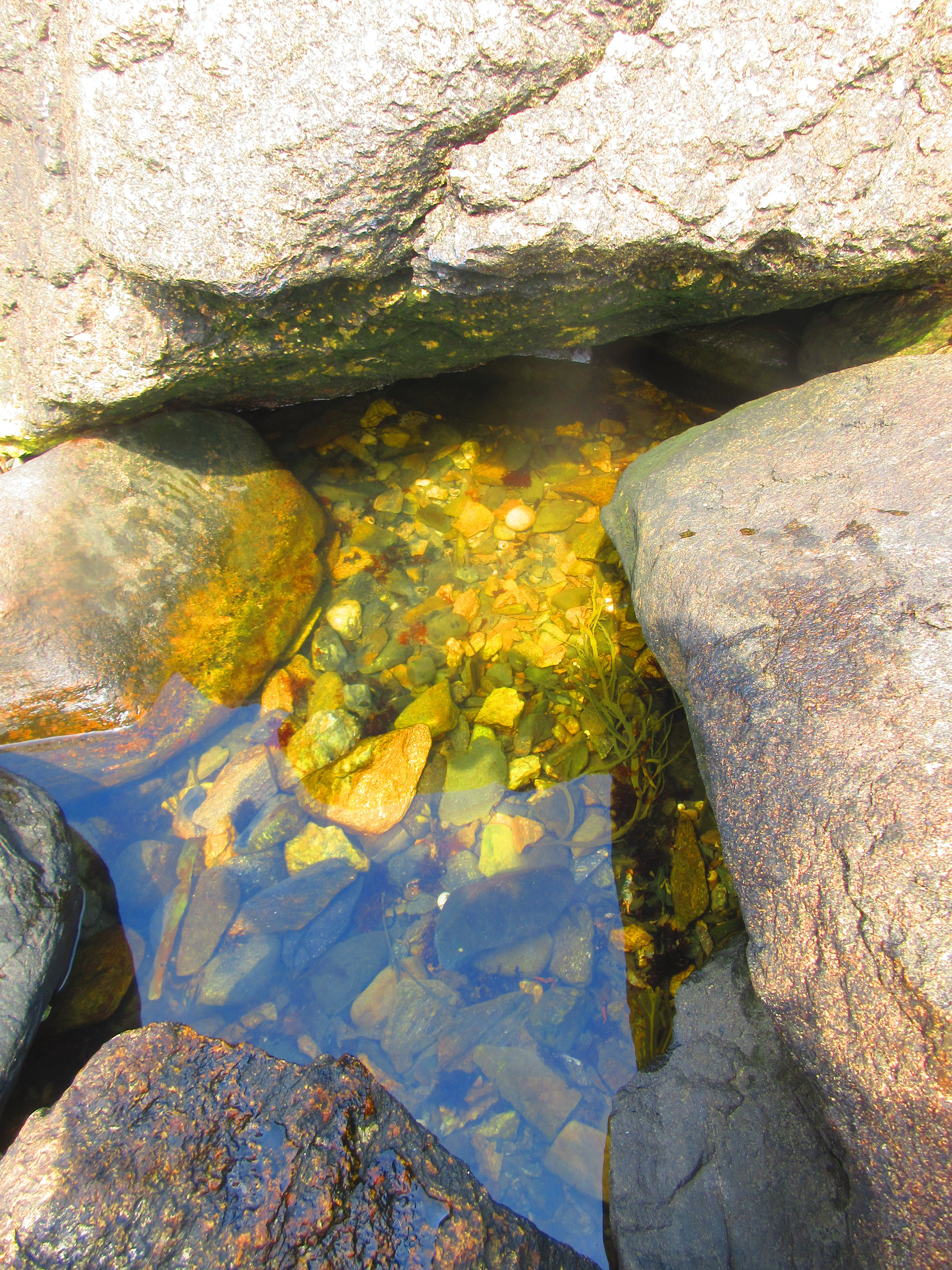
Tidal pools along the coast

== See also ==
- History of New Hampshire
- New Hampshire Historical Marker No. 78: Odiorne's Point
- New Hampshire Route 1A
- Seacoast defense in the United States
- United States Army Coast Artillery Corps
- Harbor Defense Command
