= 22nd Coast Artillery (United States) =

22nd Coast Artillery Regiment
- Active: 1940 - 1944
- Country: United States
- Branch: Army
- Type: Coast artillery
- Role: Harbor defense
- Size: Regiment
- Part of: Harbor Defenses of Portsmouth
- Garrison/HQ: Fort Constitution; Camp Langdon
- Mascot(s): Oozlefinch

The 22nd Coast Artillery Regiment was a Coast Artillery regiment in the United States Army. It was the garrison of the Harbor Defenses of Portsmouth in World War II. The 22nd CA (Harbor Defense) (HD) Regiment was active from February 1940 until broken up in March 1944 as part of an Army-wide reorganization.

== Lineage ==
Constituted in the Organized Reserve (OR) 31 March 1924 as the 614th Coast Artillery Battalion; redesignated as the 614th Coast Artillery Regiment 19 March 1926. On 1 September 1934 was withdrawn from the OR and allotted to the Regular Army as inactive. Redesignated as the 22nd Coast Artillery Regiment (Harbor Defense) (HD) and regimental Headquarters and Headquarters Battery (HHB) activated 1 February 1940 at Fort Constitution, New Hampshire by reorganizing caretaker detachment of HHB 8th Coast Artillery.

- HHB 1st Battalion activated 1 June 1940; Batteries A, B and C organized in late 1940 and early 1941 at Camp Langdon, New Hampshire.
- HHB 2nd Battalion (Fort Stark), and Batteries D (Fort Constitution), E (Fort Foster, Maine), and F and G (searchlight) (Camp Langdon) activated 1 June 1941.
- 1st Battalion HHB and Battery A moved to Ft. Constitution 10 June 1941, Battery B manned Fort Stark, and Battery C was at Camp Langdon. Battery D moved to Fort Foster at some point.
- Battery E moved from Fort Foster to Biddeford Pool, Maine on 12 February 1943, relieving Battery F, 240th Coast Artillery, which had manned a battery of 155 mm GPF guns there since December 1941.
- 1st Battalion HHB moved from Fort Constitution to Pulpit Rock in 1942 until moved to Fort Foster 28 October 1943. 1st Battalion HHB was replaced at Pulpit Rock by Battery E, 22nd CA, from Biddeford Pool 28 October 1943.
- Battery C moved from Camp Langdon to Fort Constitution in 1942 and to Fort Stark 28 October 1943.
- The 22nd Coast Artillery was dissolved on 1 March 1944, with some personnel reassigned to HD Portsmouth. The remaining elements were moved to Camp Hood, Texas for inactivation by reassigning their personnel to five field artillery battalions. Another, less detailed source states the regiment was dissolved on 7 October 1944.

== See also ==
- Seacoast defense in the United States
- United States Army Coast Artillery Corps
- Harbor Defense Command
