= Pulpit Rock Tower =

- Pulpit Rock Base-End Station (N. 142)
- U.S. National Register of Historic Places
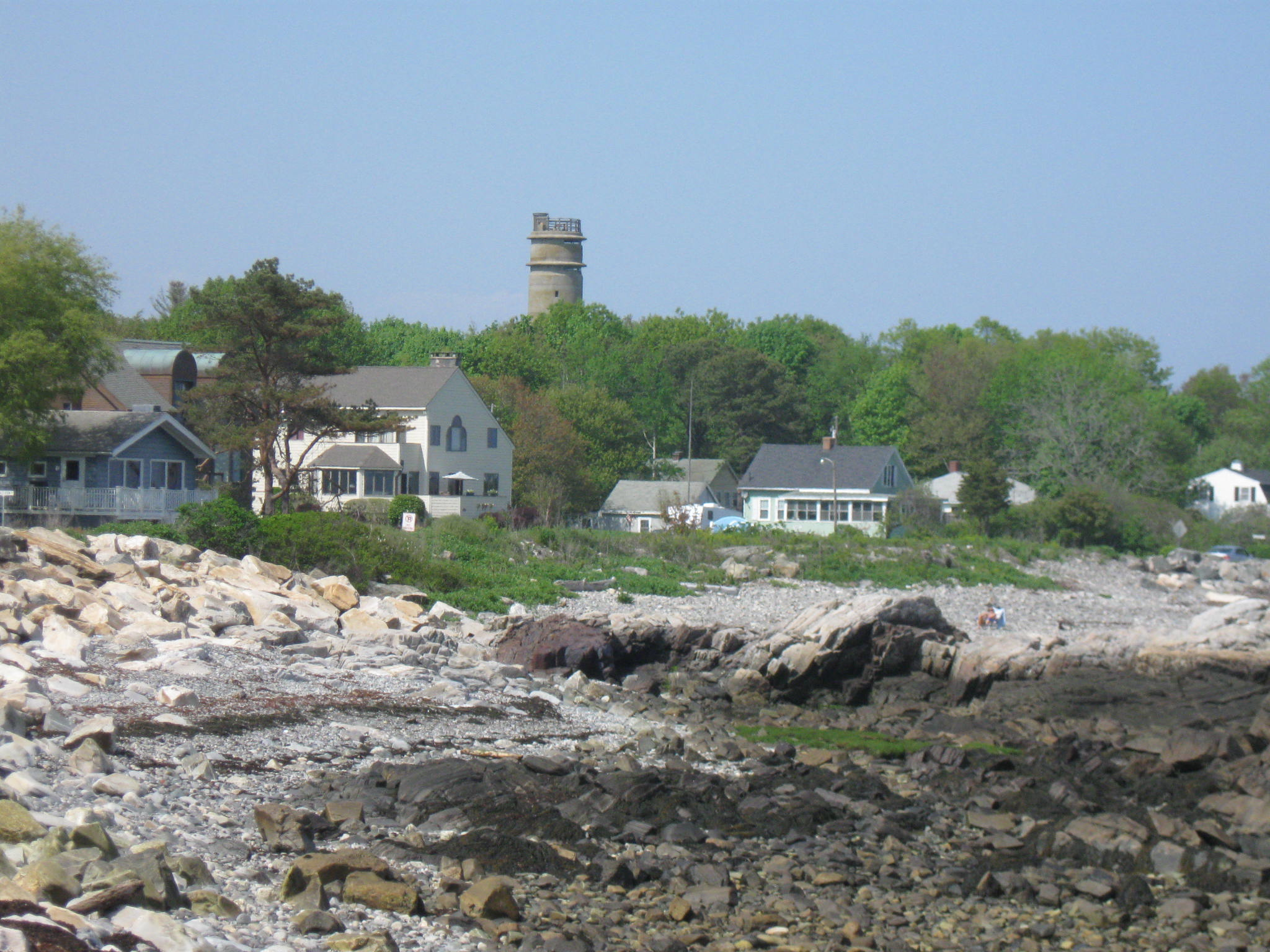
- Pulpit Rock Tower, visible above the tree line

- Location within New Hampshire Location within the United States
- Location: 9 Davis Rd., Rye, New Hampshire
- Coordinates: 43.0336°N 70.7205°W
- Area: 0.4 acres (0.16 ha)
- Built: 1944
- Built by: US Army Corps of Engineers
- Architectural style: Moderne, Coastal artillery fire contr
- NRHP reference No.: 10000188
- Added to NRHP: April 16, 2010

Pulpit Rock Tower, also known as Pulpit Rock Base-End Station (N. 142), is a historic military observation tower at 9 Davis Road in Rye, New Hampshire. Built in 1943 as part of the Harbor Defenses of Portsmouth, a series of military defenses around Portsmouth, it is the only one of fourteen World War II-era observation posts to survive. Now owned by the state, it is periodically open to the public, and maintained by a local non-profit organization. It was listed on the National Register of Historic Places in 2010.

== Description and history ==
The Pulpit Rock Tower is located in northern Rye, on a small state-owned parcel of land between Neptune Drive and Pulpit Rock Road. It is accessed via a footpath from Neptune Drive. It is a concrete structure of eight stories, and stands 73 feet (22 m) in height. Its walls are 12 inches (30 cm) thick, and its floors are 13.5 inches (34 cm) thick. The interior has a six-level spiral concrete staircase, and the tower's top two levels are accessed by wooden ladders. An observation platform is located at the top level.

The tower was built in 1943 by the United States Army Corps of Engineers, and was the only tower of its type built on the New Hampshire seacoast. It is the only one of fourteen coastal observation posts to survive from the Second World War in the state. During the war, the tower was connected to nearby Fort Dearborn by telephone to relay observational measurements.

The tower is now owned by the state of New Hampshire. The non-profit Friends of Pulpit Rock performs limited maintenance and restoration work on the structure, and periodically organizes public access.

== See also ==
- National Register of Historic Places listings in Rockingham County, New Hampshire
