= 3-inch gun M1903 =

3-inch gun M1898, M1902, M1903
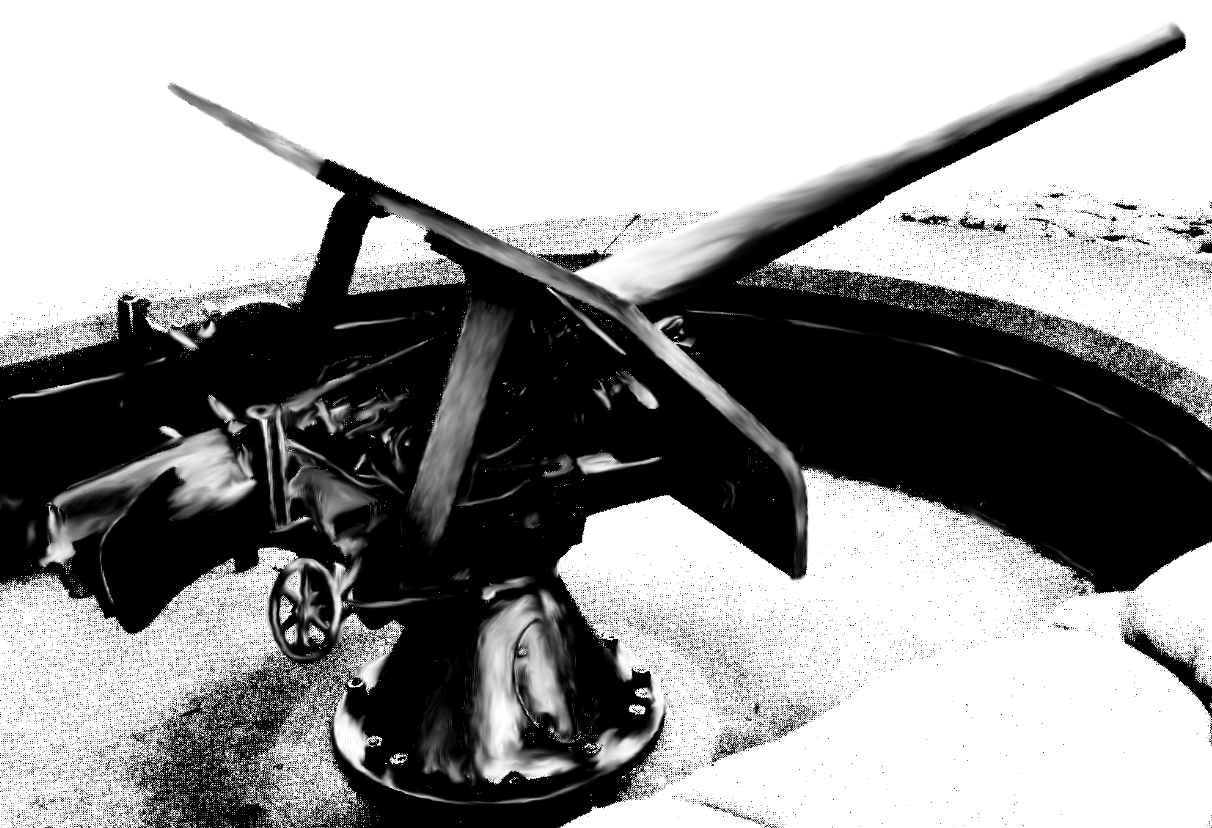
- 3-inch gun M1903
- Type: Rapid-fire seacoast gun
- Place of origin: United States

Service history
- In service: 1899–1945
- Used by: United States Army Coast Artillery Corps
- Wars: World War I and World War II

Production history
- Designed: M1898: 1898; M1902: 1902; M1903: 1903
- Manufacturer: M1898: Driggs-Seabury; M1902: Bethlehem Steel; M1903: Watervliet Arsenal
- Variants: M1898, M1898M1; M1902; M1903, M1903MI

Specifications
- Mass: M1898: gun & breech 1,782 lb (808 kg); M1902: gun & breech 1,950 lb (885 kg); M1903: gun & breech 2,690 lb (1,220 kg)
- Length: M1898: 155 in (394 cm); M1902: 159 in (404 cm); M1903: 175 in (444 cm)
- Barrel length: M1898 & M1902: 50 calibers (150 in (381 cm)); M1903: 55 calibers (165 in (419 cm))
- Crew: 15 (wartime), 12 (peacetime), 3 to operate the gun, remainder to handle ammunition
- Shell: Fixed ammunition, 15 lb (6.8 kg) shell
- Caliber: 3-inch (76.2 mm)
- Action: Hand operated
- Breech: interrupted screw, De Bange type
- Recoil: hydro-spring, 45 inches (114 cm)
- Carriage: M1898: masking parapet (retractable); M1902 & M1903: pedestal
- Elevation: -5° – +16° (+12° for M1898, +15° for M1902)
- Traverse: 360° (limited by emplacement in most cases)
- Rate of fire: 12 rounds/minute (up to 30 rounds/minute maximum)
- Muzzle velocity: 2,800 ft/s (850 m/s)
- Effective firing range: M1902: 10,988 yd (10,047 m) at 15° elevation M1903: 11,328 yd (10,358 m) at 16° elevation
- Maximum firing range: 12,000 yd (11,000 m) approx.
- Feed system: Manual
- Sights: Telescopic

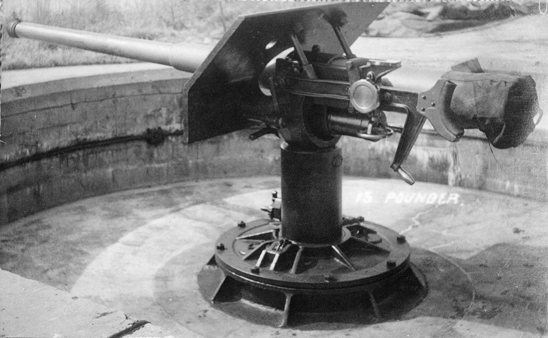
3-inch gun M1898 on retractable masking parapet carriage M1898.

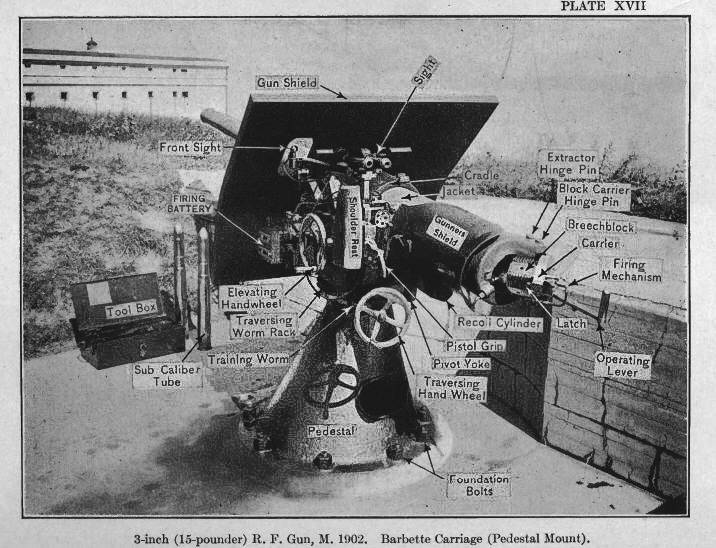
3-inch M1902 seacoast gun, annotated.

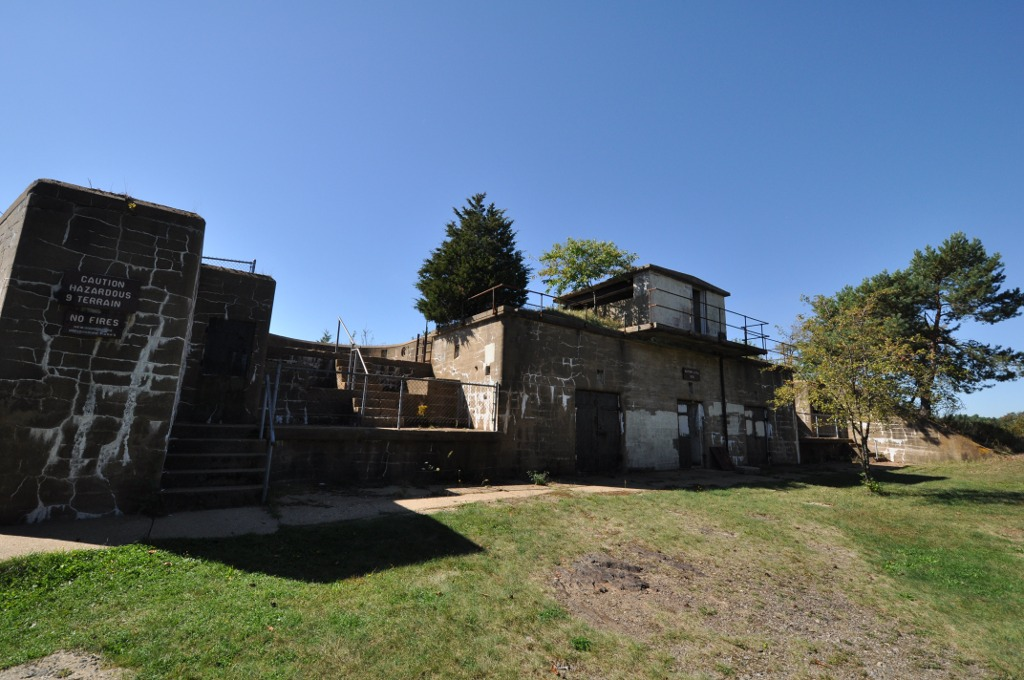
Typical two-gun 3-inch battery, Battery Lytle, Fort Stark, New Hampshire.

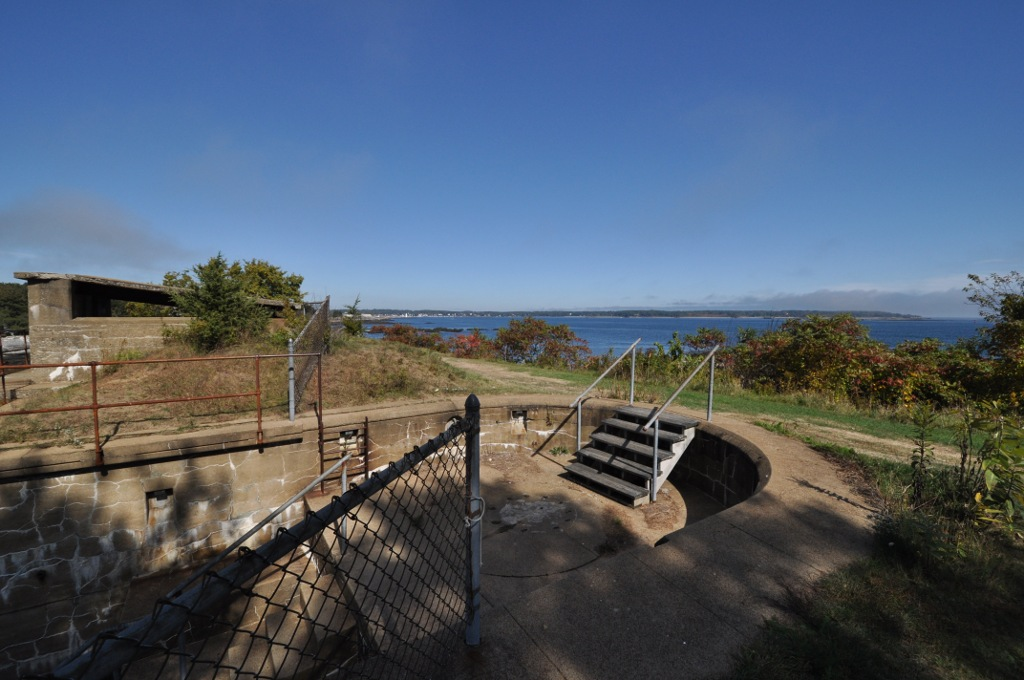
Typical 3-inch gun emplacement, Fort Stark, New Hampshire.

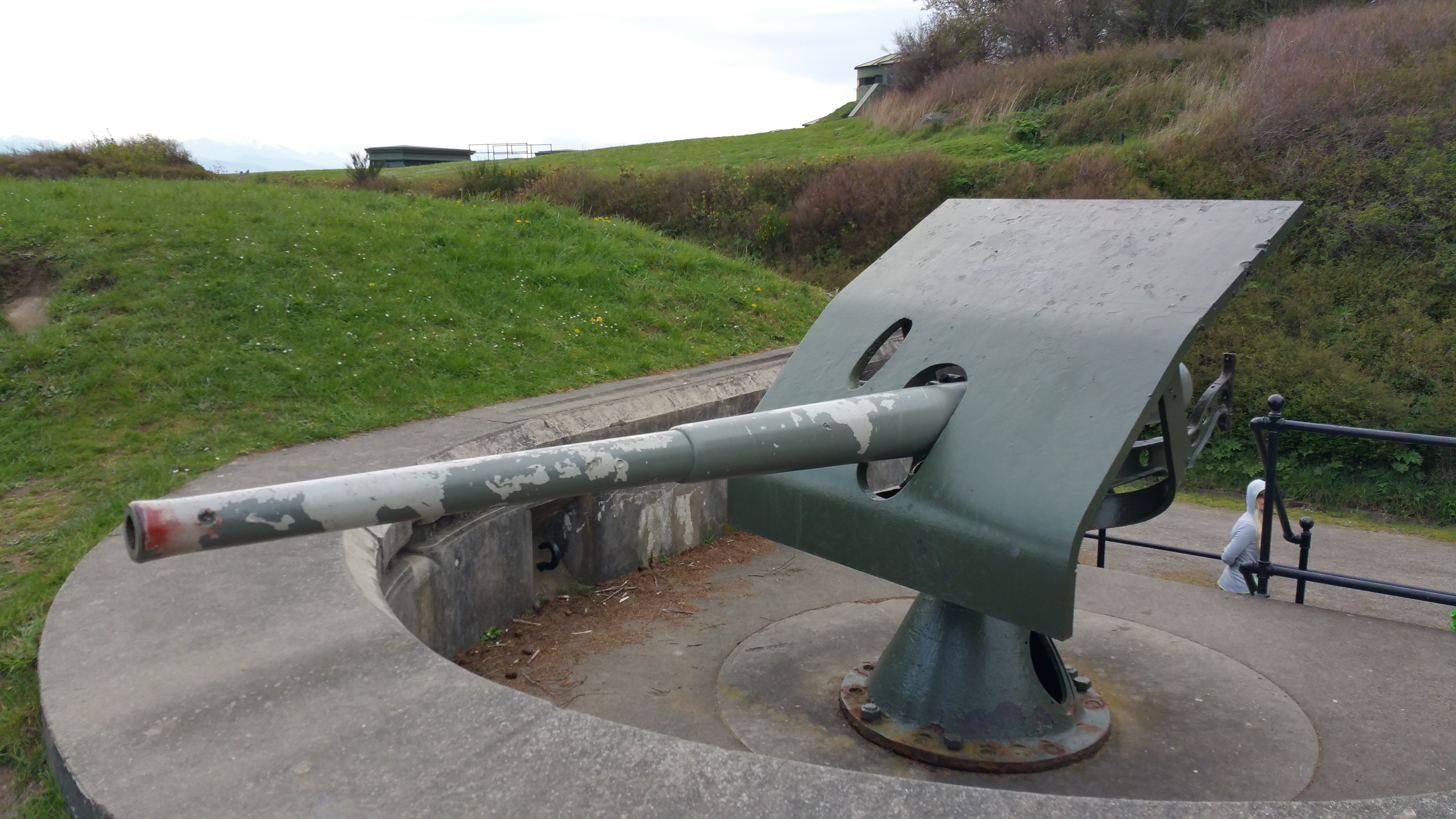
3-inch gun M1903 at Fort Casey, Washington state, formerly at Fort Wint, Subic Bay, Philippines.

The 3-inch gun M1903 and its predecessors the M1898 and M1902 were rapid fire breech-loading artillery guns with a 360-degree traverse. In some references they are called "15-pounders" due to their projectile weight. They were originally emplaced from 1899 to 1917 and served until shortly after World War II. These 3-inch guns were placed to provide fire to protect underwater mines and nets against minesweepers, and also to protect against motor torpedo boats. In some documentation they are called "mine defense guns". The 3-inch guns were mounted on pedestal mounts (or a retractable "masking parapet" mount for the M1898) that bolted into a concrete emplacement that provided cover and safety for the gun's crew.

== History ==
The 3-inch mine defense guns were part of a comprehensive plan of new fortifications specified by the Board of Fortifications of 1885. The new forts initially included guns up to 12-inch (305 mm) on disappearing carriages, to conceal the fort from observation from the sea. The 3-inch guns were the smallest of these guns, intended to protect remotely controlled minefields against minesweepers. For most of their service they were operated by the United States Army Coast Artillery Corps. They were based on an 1897 Board of Ordnance and Fortification requirement for a weapon intermediate between 6-pounder (57 mm) guns and 5-inch (127 mm) guns.

=== M1898 ===
The M1898 was the first of the new 3-inch guns developed. It was manufactured by Driggs-Seabury and was on an M1898 "masking parapet" retractable carriage. This was a proprietary term Driggs-Seabury coined to distinguish their carriage from the similar "balanced pillar" carriage of the 5-inch gun M1897, built by other manufacturers. Unlike the disappearing carriages of most larger weapons, the carriage could only be retracted when the gun was at a particular traverse angle (in most installations 90° off the emplacement axis), thus it provided no concealment when in action. Approximately 120 of these were built between 1899 and 1903, and at least 111 of these weapons were emplaced between 1899 and 1905. The gun's elevation was from -5° to +12°; at first it was traversed by pushing on a shoulder bar, and in 1904 was modified with a wheel-and-gear traversing system. Open illuminated night sights were initially issued; in 1899 the Warner and Swasey M1899 Type A 3.5× telescopic sight was provided.

Official correspondence between Major Louis R. Burgess, commander of the Artillery District of Mobile (Alabama), and senior Ordnance Corps officers began in December 1912. This brought up several deficiencies in the M1898 weapon, including the necessity of clamping the elevation and traverse changing the gun's elevation and interfering with tracking a moving target. The rubber eyepiece on the telescopic sight did not fully protect against injury when the weapon was fired; an injury to Sgt. Payne of the 164th Company was noted, with the remark "the lateral kick and vibration of the carriage upon recoil is destructive to the morale of the gun pointer". The lights provided for night firing also tended to become unscrewed, and the lamps for the sight's deflection scale were overly bright, apparently interfering with observation of the target. Major Burgess recommended switching to the barbette carriage M1903 and its firing lever system (as used on the 3-inch gun M1903), or modifying the masking parapet carriage with traverse and elevation gearing. In March 1913 the ordnance officers considered disabling the carriage in the up position by partially filling it with concrete. This had already been tested at Sandy Hook Proving Ground, and was gradually implemented for most M1898 carriages as the M1898MI carriage through mid-1917, though some were still unmodified in March 1919. The disabling of carriages had little negative impact; the weapon was small enough that the risk of observation from the sea was minimal.

Also in 1917, another serious deficiency appeared in the M1898: the piston rod (unclear if this was the recoil piston rod or the carriage raising piston) sometimes broke when fired, presenting a hazard to the gun crew and taking the gun out of service until repaired. The secretary of war recommended the use of a longer lanyard to fire the gun. Also, a new dual-purpose mount to allow antiaircraft fire was considered but never developed.

In March 1920 the ordnance and coast artillery leadership determined that the M1898 should be declared obsolete and removed from service. All of the M1898 guns and carriages were removed from service in 1920, with the carriages being scrapped. Except in a few cases, they were not directly replaced at the forts. In November 1931 the guns were declared obsolete, with many being donated to communities as war memorials and the rest scrapped. A number of these were presumably further donated to World War II scrap drives. At least 18 M1898 weapons survive as of 2016, along with four carriages under conservation.

An unusual emplacement for the M1898 guns was at Fort Mott, New Jersey, near Fort Delaware. Two guns were in a massive casemated emplacement named Battery Edwards, converted from an 1870s magazine. At this location it was determined that the minefields needed maximum protection.

=== M1902 ===
The M1902 was functionally similar to the M1898, but was manufactured by Bethlehem Steel and was on a non-retractable pedestal carriage. 60 of these weapons were built and emplaced 1903–1910. It was not the same weapon as the 3-inch M1902 field gun.

=== M1903 ===
The M1903 was a slight improvement on the M1902 with the bore lengthened from 50 calibers to 55 calibers for increased range. References vary as to whether the bore was lengthened or not, but the increase in overall length supports that it was. The weapon was manufactured by Watervliet Arsenal and was on a non-retractable pedestal carriage. 101 of these weapons were emplaced 1904–1917.

=== Basis for anti-aircraft guns ===
The 3-inch gun M1917 was a World War I-era US-made anti-aircraft gun based on the 3-inch gun M1903. It was designed for a fixed mounting and remained in service, primarily at Coast Artillery installations, through World War II. It was determined that the weapon was too heavy and had too much recoil for mobile mountings, so a new weapon based on the barrel of the lighter and less powerful 3-inch gun M1898 was developed, designated the 3-inch gun M1918. This was the standard US anti-aircraft gun until partially replaced by the 3-inch gun M3 in 1930; some M1918 guns saw action in early World War II. There is some controversy as to whether any seacoast guns were actually converted into anti-aircraft guns in the development of these weapons.

=== Replacement ===
As part of an across-the-board modernization, all types of 3-inch seacoast guns (with some exceptions, usually as examination batteries) were replaced by the 90 mm gun M1 in 1940–44 during World War II, usually in new locations. The new weapons were called Anti Motor Torpedo Boat (AMTB) guns. As they were replaced, most of the 3-inch guns were scrapped, along with almost all older Coast Artillery weapons. Almost all remaining weapons, including the new 90 mm guns, were scrapped shortly after the war ended in 1945–48.

== Where used ==
The 3-inch guns M1898, M1902, and M1903 were used at most of the coastal forts that were built under the recommendations of the Endicott Board and Taft Board. A total of 272 were emplaced worldwide 1899–1917. The number of guns in each battery varied from one to four (six in one case), but was most commonly two. The number of batteries in a fort also varied; many forts had only one 3-inch gun battery, while some had as many as four.

== Design and construction ==
=== 3-inch gun M1903 ===
The gun barrel is of the built-up type. The jacket fits over the rear end of the tube and projects beyond it. The breech bushing is screwed into the end of the jacket and the breech mechanism is assembled into the bushing. The breech bushing bears interrupted threads for the breechblock.

=== Breech mechanism ===
The function of the breech mechanism is to close the breech, and thereby hold the cartridge case in place. The breechblock is the main part of the mechanism. It closes the breech and is hinged so that it can be swung open for loading. It is moved by an operating lever. The lever and breechblock are connected by an operating bar, operating in a T-slot in the breechblock carrier. Thus connected, complete motion of the operating lever to the right will cause the breechblock to rotate and to be swung clear of the breech recess. Swinging the operating lever fully to the right engages cam surfaces of the breechblock carrier and extractor, causing the extractor to eject the empty cartridge case.

=== Firing mechanism ===
The firing mechanism is known as the continuous pull, percussion type; that is, no cocking of the firing pin is required other than a pull on the lanyard or trigger shaft.

=== Pedestal carriage M1903 ===
The gun carriage consists of a pedestal, bolted rigidly to the concrete emplacement, and of a gun-supporting structure, which rests on the pedestal and is capable of traversing upon it. The pedestal is the foundation piece of the gun carriage. On the M1903 carriage the pivot yoke is mounted in the pedestal and rests upon a ring of ball bearings on the base of the pedestal. The entire weight of the gun and top part of the carriage rests upon this ring of ball bearings. The bushings for the pivot yoke form two supports against the thrust of firing. At the upper end of the pivot yoke, on either side, trunnion bearings are provided for the cradle trunnions. The shield and shield supports are bolted to the pivot yoke. The opening for the gun in the shield is prolonged underneath to allow for the removal of the piston and springs from the recoil cylinder.

The carriage consists of recoil and counterrecoil mechanism, elevation mechanism and traversing mechanism. In addition, the M1903 carriage has a range drum.

A recoil cylinder checks the recoil of the gun, and a spring inside the recoil cylinder returns the gun to battery.

On the M1903 carriage a friction band is provided and is adjusted so as to allow a certain amount of friction between itself and the traversing rack.

== Gun crew ==
A gun battery consists of one or more gun emplacements, and is under the command of the battery commander. The battery commander is assisted by a battery executive and an assistant battery executive. These positions are filled by officers.

Each gun in an emplacement is manned by a gun section consisting of a gun squad of 15 (war strength) or 12 (peace strength) enlisted men including one noncommissioned officer, the chief of section, and an ammunition squad of 9 (war strength) or 6 (peace strength) enlisted men including one noncommissioned officer, the chief of ammunition.

== Ammunition ==
The ammunition for this gun is fixed and of a weight that can be handled entirely by hand. The ammunition is brought from the magazine to the gun and held ready for loading. To load, push the shell home into the breech recess of the gun with a moderately quick motion of the hand.

Ammunition for the 3-inch gun M1903 is issued in the form of fixed complete rounds. The term "fixed" signifies that the propelling charge is fixed (not adjustable) and that the round is loaded into the gun as a unit. The propelling charge is assembled loosely in the cartridge case which is crimped rigidly to the projectile. A complete round of ammunition comprises all of the components necessary to fire one round.

Dependent upon the type of projectile, ammunition for these guns is classified as high explosive, target practice, blank, or drill. The high explosive projectile contains a high explosive filler. The target practice projectile contains no explosive; it consists of either a solid projectile (designated shot) or a heavy-walled projectile with an empty base cavity. The blank ammunition has a black powder (low explosive) charge in the cartridge case and no projectile. The drill ammunition consists of completely inert cartridge which simulates the service ammunition.

All projectiles are painted to prevent rust and corrosion and by the color to provide a ready means of identification as to type. The projectiles of the ammunition described herein are painted as follows:

3-inch Gun M1903
Round	Color	Marking
High explosive	Yellow	black
Practice (Projectile is inert.)	Black	White
Drill or dummy (Round is inert)	Black	White

Note that the above color scheme is not wholly in agreement with the basic color scheme, described in TM 9-1900, practice projectiles being generally painted blue.

== Specifications ==
Specifications from TM 9-421

3-inch Gun M1903
Length, total over-all	175 in (4,445 mm)
Length of bore	50 calibers
Maximum diameter of chamber	4.31 in (109.47 mm)
Weight, including breech mechanism	2,690 lb (1,220 kg)
Type of construction	Built-up
Rifling:Twist	R.H. increasing from 1–50 at origin to 1–25
Number of grooves	24
Width of groove	0.2927 in (7.43 mm)
Depth of groove	0.03 in (0.76 mm)
Width of land	0.10 in (2.54 mm)
Type of breechblock	Slotted screw
Type of breech mechanism	Lever pull
Number of handles to operate	1
Power	Hand
Type of firing mechanism	Continuous pull
Muzzle velocity, maximum	2,800 ft (853 m) per second
Range, maximum:
(Using Shell, H. E., M42 and M42A1)	10,943 yd (10,006 m)
(Using Shell, H. E., 15 lb, M1915)	11,328 yd (10,358 m)
(Using Shell, H.E., MK1)	9,177 yd (8,391 m)
Life of gun (full charge)	2,500 rounds
Rate of fire (normal)	12 rounds per minute
Rate of fire (maximum)	30 rounds per minute
Carriage, 3-inch M1903
Type	Pedestal
Total weight	3,310 lb (1,501 kg)
Elevating mechanism:
Type	Screw
Power	Hand
Speed	Variable
Maximum elevation	+16 degrees
Minimum elevation	-10 degrees
Traversing mechanism:
Type of bearing	Ball
Mean diameter of roller path	3.3 in (83.8 mm)
Maximum traverse	360 degrees
Pedestal, outer flange diameter	42 in (1,067 mm)

Traverse dependent upon construction and emplacement

== Surviving examples ==
At least 23 3-inch seacoast guns, four mountings, and two training dummies survive:

- Two 3-inch guns M1902M1 (#6 and #7 Bethlehem) at Battery Irwin, Fort Monroe, VA
- Two 3-inch guns M1903 (#11 and #12) at Battery Trevor, Fort Casey, Coupeville, WA (guns moved in the 1960s from Battery Flake, Fort Wint, Grande Island, Subic Bay Philippines)
- One 3-inch gun M1903 (#17) at Battery Wansboro, Fort Flagler, Nordland, WA (gun moved in the 1960s from Battery Jewell, Fort Wint, Grande Island, Subic Bay Philippines)
- One 3-inch gun M1898M1 (#120 Driggs-Seabury), Central Park, West Rutland, Vermont
- One 3-inch gun M1898M1 (#75 Driggs-Seabury), Town Hall, Lacey Road, Forked River, New Jersey
- One 3-inch gun M1898M1, Valhalla Firehouse, Valhalla, NY
- One 3-inch gun M1898M1 (#122 Driggs-Seabury), Pulaski Square, Cleveland, OH
- One 3-inch gun M1898M1, Mount Pleasant Cemetery, Elbridge, New York
- One 3-inch gun M1898M1, Copper Street Cemetery, Vernon, NY
- Three 3-inch guns M1898M1, (#27, 28, 85 Driggs-Seabury), Valley Forge Military Academy and College, Wayne, PA
- One 3-inch gun M1898M1 (#92 Driggs-Seabury), Town Hall, Brighton, NY
- Two 3-inch guns M1898M1 (#37 and #38 Driggs-Seabury), American Legion post, Penfield, NY
- Two 3-inch guns M1898M1 (#11 and #118 Driggs-Seabury), Schell Memorial Cemetery, Boyertown, PA
- One 3-inch gun M1898M1 (#60 Driggs-Seabury), Route 22, Harrisburg, PA
- One 3-inch gun M1898M1 (#88 Driggs-Seabury), Orange, MA
- One 3-inch gun M1898M1 (#39 Driggs-Seabury), American Legion Post 397, Shrewsbury, MA
- One 3-inch gun M1898M1 (Unk. mfr.), Oregon Military Museum (closed since 2009, plans to re-open), Camp Withycombe, Clackamas, OR
- Four 3-inch masking parapet mounts M1898, FL Historical Resources Conservation Laboratory, Tallahassee, Florida (discovered at Fort Taylor, Key West, FL)
- One training dummy M1911 (#2 Watervliet) on barbette carriage M1912 (#1 Cowdrey Machine), U.S. Army Ordnance Training and Heritage Center, Fort Gregg-Adams, VA
- One training dummy M1911 (#unk Watervliet) on barbette carriage M1912 (#unk Cowdrey Machine), Battery McCorkle, Fort Moultrie, Sullivan's Island, SC

== See also ==
- Seacoast defense in the United States
- United States Army Coast Artillery Corps
- 3-inch M1902 field gun
- 3-inch gun M1918
- 3"/50 caliber gun - US Navy equivalent
- List of U.S. Army weapons by supply catalog designation SNL E-2
