= Board of Fortifications =

American defensive evaluation boards

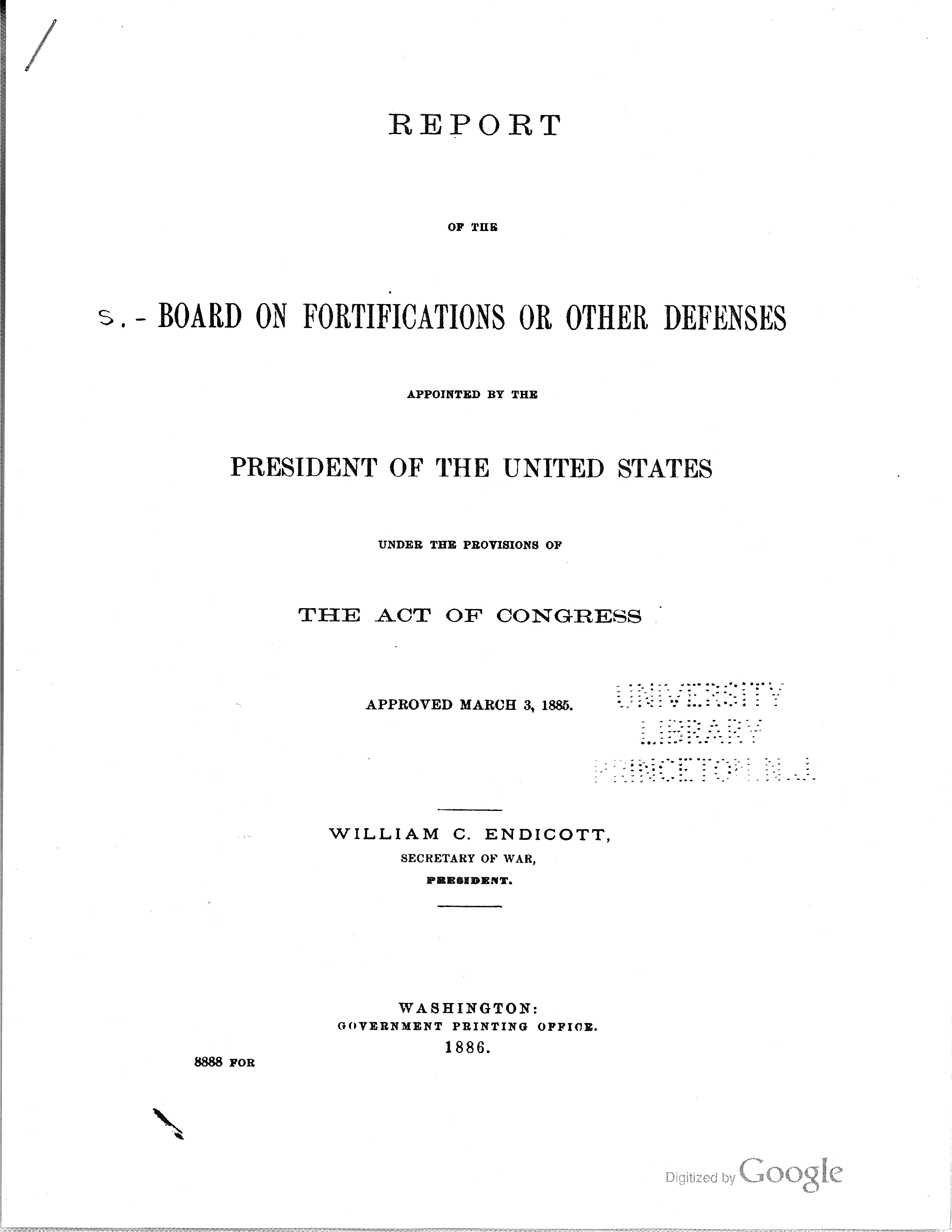
Board of Fortifications report, 1886

Several boards have been appointed by US presidents or Congress to evaluate the US defensive fortifications, primarily coastal defenses near strategically important harbors on the US shores, its territories, and its protectorates.

== Endicott Board ==
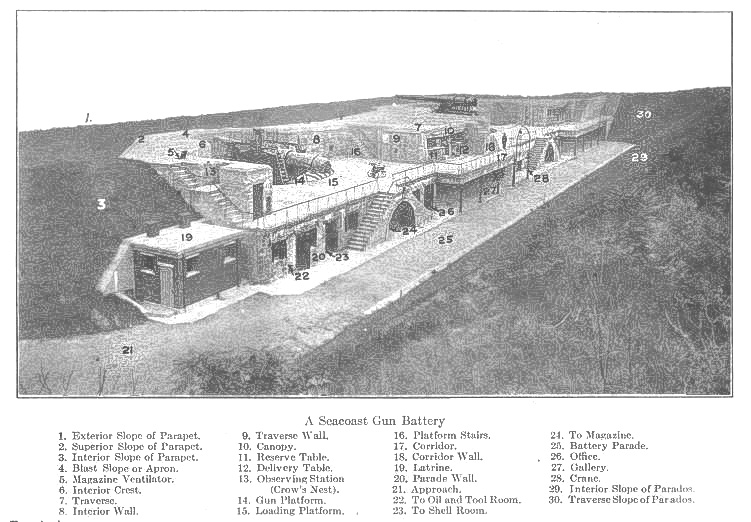
Endicott Period battery with two guns on disappearing carriages

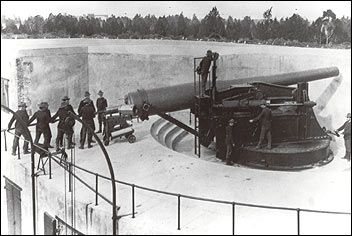
10-inch disappearing gun at Battery Granger, Fort Hancock, New Jersey

In 1885, US President Grover Cleveland appointed a joint Army, Navy and civilian board, headed by Secretary of War William Crowninshield Endicott, known as the Board of Fortifications (now usually referred to simply as the Endicott Board). The findings of the Board in its 1886 report illustrated a grim picture of neglect of America's coast defenses and recommended a massive $127 million construction program for a series of new forts with breech-loading cannons, mortars, floating batteries, and submarine mines for some 29 locations on the US coast. Coast Artillery fortifications built between 1885 and 1905 are often referred to as Endicott Period fortifications.

The first board consisted of the following officers and civilians:

- William C. Endicott, Secretary of War, president of the Board
- Brigadier-General Stephen V. Benet, Chief of Ordnance
- Brigadier-General John Newton, Chief of Engineers
- Lieutenant-Colonel Henry L. Abbot, Corps of Engineers
- Captain Charles S. Smith, Ordnance Department
- Commander W.T. Sampson, U.S. Navy
- Commander Caspar F. Goodrich, U.S Navy
- Mr. Joseph Morgan, jr.
- Mr. Erastus Corning

Prior efforts at harbor defense construction had ceased in the 1870s. Since that time the design and construction of heavy ordnance had advanced rapidly, including the development of superior breech-loading and longer-range cannon, making U.S. harbor defenses obsolete. In 1883, the Navy had begun a new construction program with an emphasis on offensive rather than defensive warships, and many foreign powers were building more heavily armored warships with larger guns. These factors combined to create a need for improved coastal defense systems.

The Endicott Era Defenses were constructed, in large part, during the years of 1890–1910 and some remained in use until 1945. Endicott Era Forts ushered the transition from mortar to concrete as a building material in response to the massive technological discoveries in arms and ordnance brought on by the American Civil War. Masonry walls shrouding hordes of smooth-bore cannon could no longer serve as a primary coastal defense mechanism, thus the Endicott Era Defenses were born.

Endicott Era Forts were constructed with concrete walls that concealed large, breech-loading rifled cannons mounted on "disappearing carriages". These disappearing carriages allowed the new, rifled cannons to be raised above the walls, aimed, and fired, and then quickly moved back underneath the walls, becoming invisible from the sea. The fact that these cannons were "breech loading" is also not to be overlooked as a significant technological advancement, as it allowed for a much more rapid, accurate, and safe manipulation of artillery by its crew. This became even more important as warships of the era (such as the Spanish battleship Pelayo) were armored with steel plates, increasing the necessity of accurate, sustained fire in anti-ship warfare. These larger guns were complemented by a variety of other ordnance best explained by describing the armament of Fort Hancock, one of the main forts of the Harbor Defenses of Southern New York, part of which was the prototype by which all other Endicott Era forts were constructed.

Fort Hancock's Endicott Era Defenses:

Dynamite Gun Battery: (3) 15" dynamite guns and (1) 8" dynamite gun

Battery Potter: (2) 12" disappearing guns. (This unique gun lift battery and the Mortar Battery were the first prototype concrete gun batteries of the Endicott System)

Battery Granger: (2) 10" counterweight disappearing guns

Nine-Gun Battery Consisted of Batteries:

- Alexander: (2) 12" counterweight disappearing guns
- Richardson: (2) 12" counterweight disappearing guns
- Bloomfield: (2) 12" counterweight disappearing guns
- Halleck: (3) 10" counterweight disappearing guns

Mortar Battery Consisted of Batteries:

- McCook: (8) 12" Mortars
- Reynolds: (8) 12" Mortars

Fort Hancock was also equipped with several batteries of rapid fire guns, tasked with protecting the underwater minefields from smaller, swifter-moving vehicles. The rapid-fire gun batteries were:

Battery Engle: (1) 5" gun on pedestal mounts

Battery Morris: (4) 3" guns on pedestal mounts

Battery Urmston: (4) 15-pounders and (2) 3" guns on pedestal mounts

Battery Peck: (2) 6" guns on pedestal mounts

Battery Gunnison: (2) 6" counterweight disappearing guns

In addition to submarine nets and searchlights, Fort Hancock, and other Forts of the Endicott System, also had a hidden, unseen weapon that harnessed the newfound power of the age: an underwater controlled minefield system that utilized a mine casemate on Sandy Hook from where underwater mines could be detonated at will via electrical cables to destroy warships. This marked the first instance of concrete and electricity being used together in defenses.

An easily overlooked aspect of the Endicott Era Defenses, especially with the necessary highlighting of the breech-loading rifled artillery mounted on disappearing carriages, are the mortars. At Fort Hancock, Battery Potter's (2) 12" guns mounted on disappearing carriages and the Mortar Battery, together formed the model for other Endicott Era Forts. The reason is because the mortars were: 1) voluminous 2) before the establishment of the Coast Artillery Corps in 1907 (see below) they operated in the Abbot-Quad design, which very nicely complemented the capabilities of the larger, rifled guns. The Abbot-Quad design called for mortars to be fired in 4-16 gun salvos, in shotgun-like patterns designed to overcome the shortcomings of range-finding techniques of the time. This mode of fire resulted in clusters of mortar fire raining from above, with a much steeper arch than other artillery shells, which rained ½ ton mortar shells down onto the often poorly armored decks of enemy ships, which served to incite panic as well as material destruction. Of the Endicott Era Defenses armaments, the mortars exceeded all but the 12" M1888 (disappearing carriage) guns in range and, although pursuant to the Abbot-Quad design they were not intended to operate as such, they did have a 360 degree field of fire providing great versatility.

In 1907, the Coast Artillery Corps was created from the heavy artillery units which previously manned the forts. This vastly increased garrisons and catalyzed the installation of electrical plants at various forts. Other technological improvements at all forts included meteorological stations and telephone communications. All of this served as the capstone of the Endicott Era defenses, soon to be further advanced in the Taft Era.

== Taft Board ==
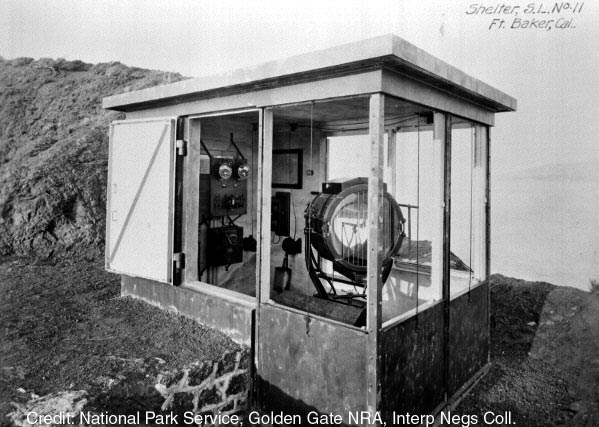
Fire control searchlight at Fort Baker, California

In 1905, after the experiences of the Spanish–American War, President Theodore Roosevelt appointed a new board, under Secretary of War William Howard Taft. They updated some standards and reviewed the progress on the Endicott Board's program. Most of the changes recommended by the Taft Board were technical, such as adding more searchlights, electrification (lighting, communications, and projectile handling), and more sophisticated optical aiming techniques. The Board also recommended fortifications in territories acquired from Spain (Cuba and the Philippines), as well as Hawaii, and a few other sites. Defenses in Panama were authorized by the Spooner Act of 1902. The Taft program fortifications differed slightly in battery construction and had fewer guns at a given location than those of the Endicott program. Since Japan was known to be planning the Fusō-class battleships armed with 14-inch guns, during the Taft program's implementation the 14-inch gun M1907 and similar models were developed and deployed in the Philippines, Panama, Hawaii, and Los Angeles.

== World War I and later ==
By the time of the First World War, many of the Endicott and Taft era forts had become obsolete due to the increased range and accuracy of naval weaponry and the advent of aircraft. In the 1920s and 1930s, most U.S. coast defense facilities were put on "maintenance" status, a type of "mothballing." In the late 1930s and early 1940s, a new program of construction added huge 16-inch gun batteries, as well as rapid-firing 6-inch and 90 mm guns (for use against motor torpedo boats) to many harbors' defenses, and large fields of submarine mines were still being deployed as well. As the new weapons were deployed, almost all of the older weapons were scrapped. As it became clearer that the U.S. was unlikely to face seaborne attack, these defenses were largely discontinued by 1945, and were decommissioned altogether after 1946.

== Endicott–Taft forts at war ==
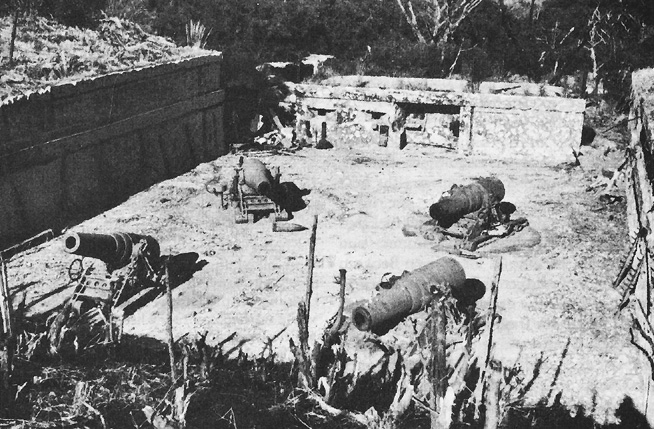
Battery Way following the Battle of Corregidor (1945)

The only Endicott era fort to come under direct enemy fire was Fort Stevens at the mouth of Columbia River in Oregon. On the night of June 20, 1942, the Japanese submarine I-25 surfaced off the coast and proceeded to shell Fort Stevens in the vicinity of Battery Russell. There were no U.S. casualties and damage to the fort was negligible. The battery commander made the decision not to return fire.

Several Taft era fortifications in the Philippines were attacked and captured by Imperial Japanese forces within a few months of the U.S. entry into World War II. Fort Mills, Fort Hughes, Fort Drum (El Fraile Island), and Fort Frank guarding the entrance to Manila Bay were subjected to a three-month siege that ended when U.S. forces surrendered on May 6, 1942. All four forts were recaptured by U.S. forces in early 1945. At no point was any of the Taft-era weaponry used against the targets for which they were designed, namely armored ships.

== Preserved forts and surviving weaponry ==
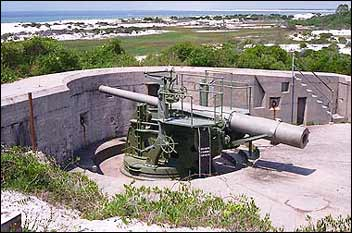
Preserved 6-inch disappearing gun at Battery Cooper, Fort Pickens

Several Endicott-Taft era forts have been preserved in the United States, though most of the period weaponry was dismantled and scrapped in the 1940s and 1950s. Fort Casey, Fort Flagler, and Fort Worden on the Puget Sound in Washington State are now state parks, their extensive concrete gun emplacements, as well as many supporting structures, have been preserved and are now open to the public. Fort Winfield Scott at the Presidio in San Francisco contains several Endicott-Taft era emplacements in various states of preservation. Fort Winfield Scott is part of the Golden Gate National Recreation Area. Only a few examples of Endicott-Taft era weaponry survive to this day in the United States.

- Battery Worth at Fort Casey contains two 10-inch M1895MI guns on disappearing carriages that were salvaged from Fort Wint in the Philippines in the 1960s.
- Battery Laidley at Fort De Soto just outside the city of St. Petersburg, Florida still possesses four 12-inch M1890-M1 mortars that were originally mounted in 1902.
- Battery Cooper at Fort Pickens near Pensacola, Florida contains one 6-inch M1905 gun on a disappearing carriage.
- Battery Chamberlin in San Francisco contains one 6-inch M1905 gun on a disappearing carriage.
- Battery New Peck (formerly Battery Gunnison) at Fort Hancock, New Jersey contains two 6-inch M1900 rifles on M1900 pedestal mounts. Of all the gun emplacements in the United States, it is the only one to have been extensively restored as a true Coast Artillery battery.

== Table of guns by caliber and carriage types ==
The following table of Endicott Era carriages is summarized from American Seacoast Defenses, edited by Mark Berhow, with pages referenced from the rows. The units column reflects the lower of the original emplacements or the carriages built, since some emplacements were not armed and some carriages not used. Carriage models after 1905 are not included in the Endicott Era table. Wikipedia links to articles on the associated guns have been added. "Balanced pillar" and "masking parapet" carriages are functionally equivalent to disappearing carriages.

Model	Carriage	Tube	Caliber	Units	Page	Gun Type(s)
M1901	disappearing	rifle	12 inch	13	150	12-inch gun M1895, M1900
M1897	disappearing	rifle	12 inch	35	148	12-inch gun M1895
M1897	altered gun lift	rifle	12 inch	3	146	12-inch gun M1888
M1896	mortar	mortar	12 inch	308	140	12-inch coast defense mortar M1890, M1912
M1896	disappearing	rifle	12 inch	27	138	12-inch gun M1888, M1895
M1892	barbette	rifle	12 inch	28	136	12-inch gun M1888
M1891	mortar	mortar	12 inch	86	134	12-inch coast defense mortar M1886
M1888	gun lift	rifle	12 inch	2	130	12-inch gun M1888
M1901	disappearing	rifle	10 inch	16	128	10-inch gun M1895, M1900
M1896	disappearing ARF	rifle	10 inch	3	126	10-inch gun M1888
M1896	disappearing	rifle	10 inch	74	124	10-inch gun M1888, M1895
M1894	disappearing	rifle	10 inch	35	122	10-inch gun M1888
M1893	barbette	rifle	10 inch	9	120	10-inch gun M1888
M1896	disappearing	rifle	8 inch	38	110	8-inch M1888
M1894	disappearing	rifle	8 inch	26	108	8-inch M1888
M1892	barbette	rifle	8 inch	9	106	8-inch M1888
M1905	disappearing	rifle	6 inch	33	100	6-inch gun M1905, M1908
M1903	disappearing	rifle	6 inch	90	98	6-inch gun M1900, M1903, M1905
M1900	pedestal	rifle	6 inch	44	96	6-inch gun M1900
M1898	disappearing	rifle	6 inch	29	94	6-inch gun M1897
Armstrong	pedestal	rifle	6 inch	8	92	6-inch Armstrong gun
M1903	pedestal	rifle	5 inch	20	90	5-inch gun M1900
M1896	balanced pillar	rifle	5 inch	32	88	5-inch gun M1897
Armstrong	pedestal	rifle	4.72 inch	34	86	4.72-inch Armstrong gun
Army/Navy	pedestal	rifle	4 inch	4	84	4-inch Driggs-Schroeder Navy gun
M1903	pedestal	rifle	3 inch	101	74	3-inch gun M1903
M1902	pedestal	rifle	3 inch	60	72	3-inch gun M1902
M1898	masking parapet	rifle	3 inch	111	70	3-inch gun M1898

== See also ==
- Seacoast defense in the United States
- List of coastal fortifications of the United States of America
