= George F. Moore (United States Army officer) =

United States Army general

George Fleming Moore
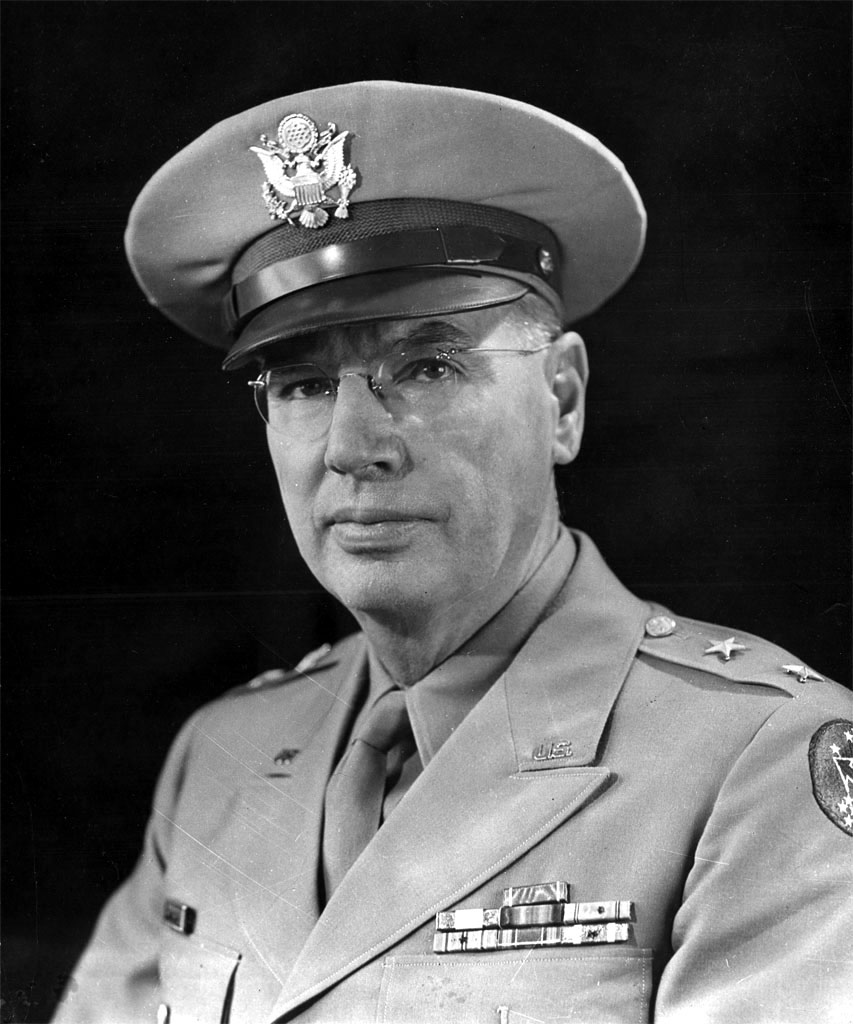
- Major General George Fleming Moore
- Born: July 31, 1887; Austin, Texas
- Died: December 2, 1949 (aged 62); Hillsborough, California
- Burial place: Golden Gate National Cemetery, San Bruno, California
- Education: A&M College of Texas
- Spouse: Lucile Griffith
- Relatives: John Marks Moore (father); George Fleming Moore (grandfather)
- Military career
- Allegiance: United States of America
- Branch: United States Army
- Service years: 1909–1949
- Rank: Major General
- Service number: O-2677
- Unit: Coast Artillery
- Commands: Philippines-Ryukyu Area; United States Army Pacific; Harbor Defenses of Manila and Subic Bays
- Conflicts: World War I World War II: Battle of Bataan
- Awards: Distinguished Service Cross; Distinguished Service Medal (2)

George Fleming Moore (July 31, 1887 – December 2, 1949) was a highly decorated officer of the United States Army with the rank of major general. He commanded the Harbor Defenses of Manila and Subic Bays and the Philippine Coast Artillery during the Battle of Bataan and was captured by Japanese on May 6, 1942, spending the remainder of the war in captivity.

For his service in the Philippines, Moore was decorated with Distinguished Service Cross, the United States Army's second highest military decoration for soldiers who display extraordinary heroism in combat with an armed enemy force.

Upon his return from the captivity, Moore remained on active duty and held several important assignments including command of United States Army Pacific, Philippines-Ryukyu Area or Deputy Commander, Sixth U.S. Army before retiring in late 1949. He never completely recovered from his time in captivity, and committed suicide on December 2, 1949.

== Early life and education ==
George Fleming Moore was born on July 31, 1887, in Austin, Texas, as the son of John Marks Moore and Mary Estelle Grace Moore.

He graduated from the A&M College of Texas with a Bachelor of Science degree in Civil Engineering in 1908.

He received a commission as second lieutenant in the Coast Artillery Corps on September 25, 1909. He was assigned to 63rd Company of Coast Artillery at Fort Worden, Washington. Upon his promotion to first lieutenant in May 1912, he assumed command of the company.

In early November 1913, Moore was transferred to Fort Flagler, Washington and assumed command of 26th Company of Coast Artillery stationed there. He was ordered to the Army Coast Artillery School at Fort Monroe, Virginia in early 1915, and completed instruction there as Distinguished Graduate in November that year. Moore then joined 35th Company of Coast Artillery at Fort Monroe before being transferred to the Narragansett Bay, where he assumed command of 97th Company of Coast Artillery.

Following the United States entry into World War I, Moore was promoted to captain and temporarily transferred to the 19th Field Artillery Regiment as commanding officer of the supply company. He was promoted to the temporary rank of major of Ordnance Corps in May 1918 and transferred to the Manufacturing Division within Office of the Chief of Ordnance under Major General Clarence C. Williams. Moore served in Washington, D.C. for the remainder of the war, and received a temporary promotion to lieutenant colonel in October 1918.

In May 1920, Moore was reverted to his peacetime rank of captain, and transferred to the Army Coast Artillery School at Fort Monroe, Virginia. He was promoted to major in July 1920 and assumed duty as an instructor in the Department of Engineering at that School. He remained at Fort Monroe until mid-September 1923, when he received transfer orders to the Philippines. He was stationed at Fort Mills as commanding officer, 1st Battalion, 59th Coast Artillery until June 1924, when he assumed command of recently created 1st Battalion, 92nd Coast Artillery. His unit was made of Philippine Scouts, who were generally Filipinos and Filipino-Americans assigned to the United States Army Philippine Department.

Upon return to the United States in February 1926, Moore assumed duty as commanding officer, 1st Battalion, 12th Coast Artillery at Fort Monroe, Virginia, a unit which served within the Harbor Defenses of the Chesapeake. However, he served with the 12th Coast Artillery only until September, when he entered the Advanced Course at the Army Coast Artillery School located at Fort Monroe. Moore graduated in June 1927 and entered the Army Command and General Staff School at Fort Leavenworth, Kansas.

He graduated in September 1928 and returned to the Philippines for duty as an intelligence officer and assistant executive officer, 60th Coast Artillery (anti-aircraft) at Fort Mills. While in that capacity, he held additional duty on the staff of Harbor Defenses of Manila and Subic Bays Command.

In September 1930, Moore returned to the United States and joined the Office of the Chief of Coast Artillery in Washington, D.C. as chief of Personal Section under Major General John W. Gulick. His tour of duty ended in September 1933 when he was chosen for instruction at the Army War College. Following the graduation in June 1934, Moore was promoted to lieutenant colonel, transferred to Fort Monroe, and appointed executive officer, 3rd Coast Artillery District under Brigadier General Joseph P. Tracy. He was responsible for the coastal defense of harbors and operationally significant maritime areas of Maryland and Virginia.

In early August 1937, Moore was ordered back to his alma mater, A&M College of Texas in College Station, Texas for duty as professor of Military Science and Tactics and head of College Military Staff. While in this capacity, he was promoted to colonel in October 1938.

== World War II ==
Upon completing his tour of duty at Texas A&M, Moore was transferred to Hawaii, where he served as commanding officer, Harbor Defense of Fort Ruger within Hawaiian Department until November 1940, when he was ordered to the Philippines.

He was subsequently appointed commanding officer of the Harbor Defenses of Manila and Subic Bays. Upon his promotion to brigadier general in early 1941, he assumed additional duty as commanding general, Philippine Coast Artillery Command. His command headquarters was located at Fort Mills, Corregidor and included roughly 5,000 men and the fortified islands of Cabbalo (Fort Hughes), El Frile (Fort Drum) and Carabao (Fort Frank) at the entrance to Manila Bay and the Grande Island (Fort Wint) at the entrance to the Subic Bay. While in this capacity, Moore was responsible for the preparation and conduct of the sea, air, and land defense of the islands' bastions.

Following the Japanese invasion of the Philippines, Moore was promoted to the temporary rank of major general and directed his units defending Manila and Subic Bay. He was decorated with the Distinguished Service Cross, the United States Army's second highest military decoration for soldiers who display extraordinary heroism in combat with an armed enemy force.

His citation contains the following:

"The President of the United States of America, authorized by Act of Congress, July 9, 1918, takes pleasure in presenting the Distinguished Service Cross to Major General George Fleming Moore (ASN: 0-2677), United States Army, for extraordinary heroism in connection with military operations against an armed enemy while serving with the U.S. Army Forces in the Far East (USAFFE), as Commander of the Philippine Coast Artillery Command, while in charge of the Harbor Defenses at Manila and Subic Bays, Philippine Islands, during the months of March and April 1942. Major General Moore displayed great gallantry in continually visiting the most exposed elements in his command, and repeatedly passed from one echelon to another during sustained hostile attacks, giving encouragement, directing operations, and by his courage and example inspiring the heroic efforts of his command. The splendid efficiency and dogged determination of this garrison was largely based on his efficiency, tenacity, and individual courage. Major General Moore's extraordinary heroism, personal bravery and zealous devotion to duty exemplify the highest traditions of the military forces of the United States and reflect great credit upon himself and the United States Army."}

During General Douglas MacArthur's escape from the Philippines on March 11, 1942, on Patrol torpedo boat PT-41, Moore was summoned to the Corregidor's North Dock. There, he received a farewell from MacArthur, who told him, "keep the flag flying. I'm coming back."

MacArthur also cautioned Moore that in case of the ultimate fall of Corregidor, he was to make sure that the armament was destroyed to such an extent that it could not be used against an American effort to recapture the Philippines.

On May 6, 1942, Commander of Allied Forces in the Philippines, Lieutenant General Jonathan M. Wainwright, surrendered the Corregidor garrison at about 1:30 p.m., leading himself and Moore to be captured by the Japanese. Before that, Moore ordered his troops the destruction procedures to be executed on coast artillery guns to prevent their use by the enemy, as he had been instructed by MacArthur. He spent the remainder of the war as a POW in Manchuria until being liberated in August 1945. Moore was awarded the Distinguished Service Medal for his service in the Philippines while in captivity.

== Postwar service ==
Following his liberation, Moore spent several months in the Walter Reed Army Hospital in Washington, D.C. before assuming temporary duty at Fort Monroe, Virginia. For his service while in Japanese captivity, he was decorated with a second Distinguished Service Medal.

Moore was transferred to Hawaii in early February 1946 and assumed duty as commanding general, Artillery of the Hawaiian Department in Honolulu. He remained in that capacity for a month, before assuming temporary duty as commanding general, U.S. Army Pacific. While in this capacity, he was responsible for the defense of Hawaii, Marshalls, Gilberts, Marianas, Volcanoes, Western Carolines, New Caledonia and Guadalcanal in the Solomons.

Upon arrival of new Commanding General John E. Hull in July, Moore resumed his duties with the Hawaiian Department and served in this capacity until late November that year, when he was transferred to Manila as commanding general, Philippines-Ryukyu Area. This command was created on December 1, 1946, as the military government of the Ryukyu Islands with Army command in the Philippines.

Shortly after his arrival to Manila, Moore had to face an increasing pilferage at Army supply depots in the Philippines. He launched an investigation to halt these black market activities. By May 1947, he reported to the supreme headquarters in Tokyo that 145 U.S. Army personnel, including 13 officers and three civil service employees, had been found guilty of theft or black-marketing offenses in the Philippines over a 15-month period from January 1946 to April 1947. For his service in the Philippines-Ryukyu, he was decorated with Army Commendation Medal.

In July 1948, he returned to the United States and joined the headquarters of the Sixth U.S. Army in San Francisco, California. He assumed duty as deputy commanding general under General Mark W. Clark, and held additional duty as deputy commanding general of Unification of Facilities and Service of Presidio of San Francisco.

Moore retired from active duty on August 1, 1949, after 40 years of commissioned service, and settled in Hillsborough, California.

== Death ==
Moore's health never completely recovered from his time in Japanese captivity. In his last years of life, he feared his mind was falling. During the night of December 2, 1949, he decided to commit suicide. He waited until his wife Lucile was asleep, then drove his car to an isolated field west of Hillsborough near Skyline Boulevard. He parked his car in the middle of an open field, walked 25 feet away, and shot himself to the right temple by his Smith & Wesson Army Service .380 automatic pistol.

His body was found a few hours later when Sgt. A. J. Binder of the Hillsborough Police Department was making a routine patrol over Black Mountain Road. Moore was still holding his service pistol. A note written by Moore explaining the reasons for his suicide was found on his bed at his home. He was buried at Golden Gate National Cemetery, San Bruno, California.

== Family ==
Moore was married to Lucile Griffith (March 10, 1892 – April 5, 1972), daughter of John Williams Griffith and Mary Elizabeth (née Fox) Griffith of Port Townsend, Washington. They had one daughter, Anne (later Mrs. Burton R. Browne).

Moore's father was John Marks Moore, who was a member of the Texas House of Representatives and the secretary of state of Texas. His paternal grandfather and namesake, George Fleming Moore, was the first chief justice of the Texas Supreme Court.

== Awards and honors ==
In 1947, President of the Philippines, Manuel A. Roxas, recognized Moore's service in the Philippines by presenting him with several decorations of his government, including the Philippine Legion of Honor, Distinguished Conduct Star and Distinguished Service Star.

Moore Hall, a former residence hall at Texas A&M University, was named in his honor. The General George F. Moore Outstanding Unit Award, endowed by Gerald and Susan Sullivan, was established in 1946 to recognize the outstanding company, squadron, or battery in the Corps of Cadets at Texas A&M University.

=== Ribbon bar ===
Here is the ribbon bar of Major General Moore:

1st Row	Distinguished Service Cross	Army Distinguished Service Medal with Oak Leaf Cluster	Army Commendation Medal
2nd Row	World War I Victory Medal	American Defense Service Medal with "Foreign Service" clasp	Asiatic-Pacific Campaign Medal w/ one campaign star
3rd Row	World War II Victory Medal	Army of Occupation Medal	Philippine Legion of Honor
4th Row	Distinguished Conduct Star (Philippines)	Distinguished Service Star (Philippines)	Philippine Defense Medal with bronze star
Presidential Unit Citation with two Oak Leaf Clusters

== See also ==
- Jonathan M. Wainwright
- Edward P. King
- Samuel L. Howard
- George M. Parker
