= Battery Way =

Battery of mortars on the island of Corregidor

- Fort Mills, Corregidor Island
- Part of Harbor Defenses of Manila and Subic Bays
- Corregidor, Philippines
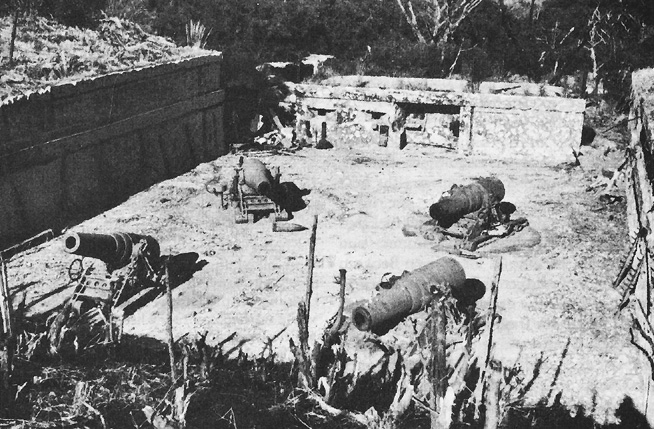
- The ruins of Battery Way following the Battle of Corregidor (1945)

Location
- Coordinates: 14°23′00.32″N 120°34′22.22″E

Site history
- Built: 1909-1914
- Built by: United States Army
- Battles/wars: Battle of Corregidor (1942); Battle of Manila (1945)

Battery Way was a battery of four 12-inch mortars located on the island of Corregidor. Battery Way was one of two (Battery Geary the other) mortar batteries at Fort Mills that, with Fort Hughes, Fort Drum, Fort Frank and Fort Wint formed the Harbor Defenses of Manila and Subic Bays. Battery Way was named for Lt. Henry N. Way of the 4th U.S. Artillery.

== Construction and design ==
Battery Way was constructed as part of the fortifications program initiated by the Taft Board. Constructed between 1908 and 1914, it was the only single-pit mortar battery built as part of the program. Its four coast defense mortars, M1890MI guns on M1896MI carriages, were designed to loft armor-piercing shells in a high trajectory onto the decks of warships threatening Manila Bay. Advances in naval gunnery and ship design rendered these weapons mostly obsolete by the end of World War I.

== World War II ==
Battery Way played a very limited role during the Philippines Campaign in the spring of 1942, only becoming active in the last week of the battle. The battery had been out of service for several years, but three of the four mortars were returned to service with a crew from Battery E, 60th Coast Artillery (AA), recently evacuated from Bataan, by 28 April. These were fired for the first time on that day against Japanese positions on nearby Bataan. Its exposure to Japanese artillery, air attack, and its limited supply of high explosive shells greatly diminished its effectiveness. By the time of the Japanese landings on Corregidor island on 5–6 May 1942, only one mortar tube of Battery Way remained serviceable, the other two having been damaged beyond repair by Japanese artillery.

The battery was manned by the Japanese after the fall of Corregidor in 1942. The guns were permanently damaged during the retaking of Corregidor by U.S. forces in early 1945.

== Post-war ==
Corregidor Island, its surviving fortifications, and associated war relics are presently maintained as a national park. Daytime and overnight tours are available. The entire island is now maintained by the Cavite Foundation Institute (CFI) of Cavite, Philippines, and the Department of Tourism. Aside from the tours, trekking, hiking, and swimming has become a part of visitors' activities.

== Battery Way in popular culture ==
- In an episode of the Filipino television show Strangebrew, Tado and Erning are looking for some batteries for Tado's flashlight when a ghost appears to them and tells them to go to Corregidor where there are many batteries (actually the Battery Way).

== Photo gallery ==
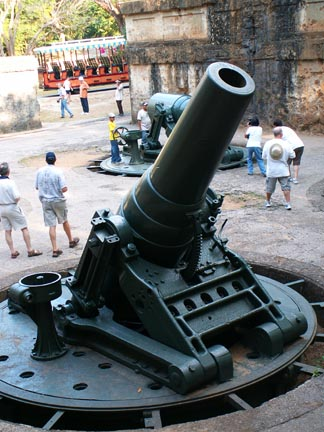
12-inch mortar

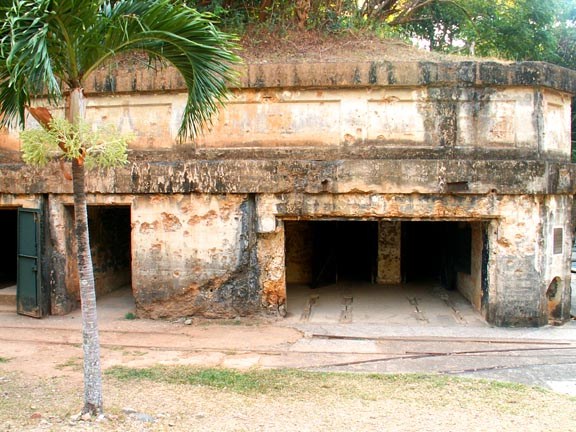
Ammunition magazine of Battery Way

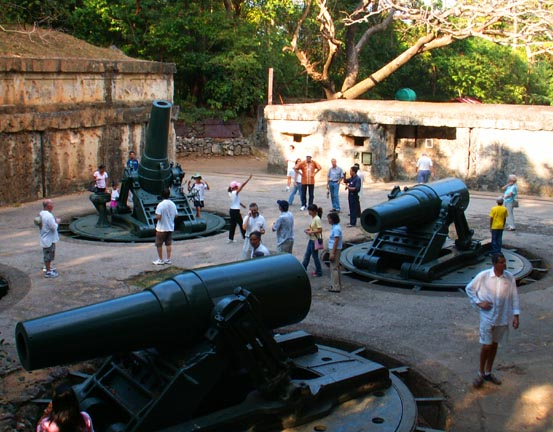
Three mortars and battery commander's station

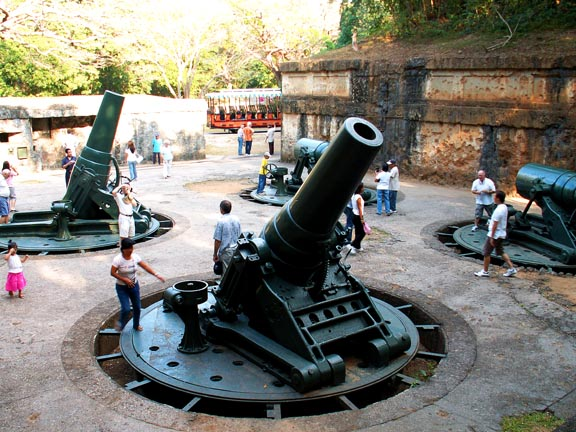
Battery Way View

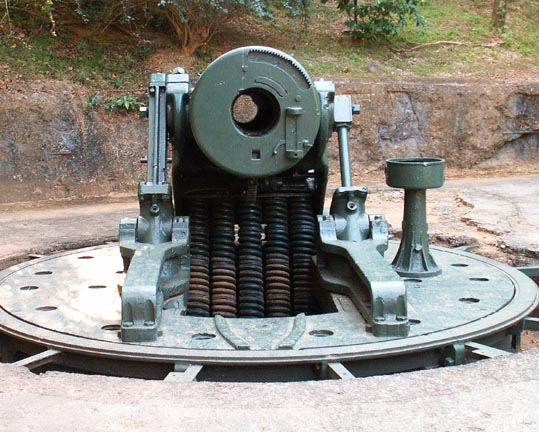
Open breech of a 12-inch mortar

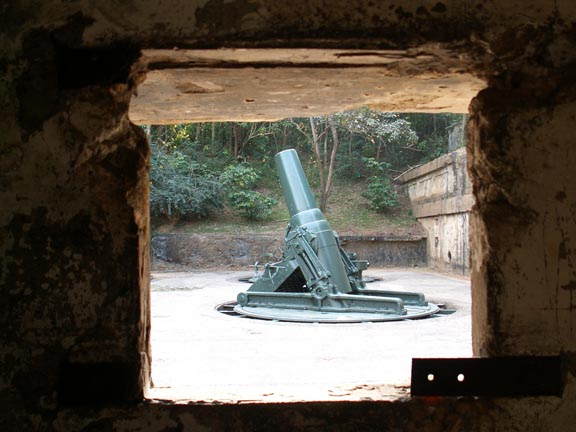
One of the mortars as viewed from the battery commander's station

== Sources ==
- Belote, James H. (1967). Corregidor, Saga of a Fortress. Harper&Row.
- Kaufmann, J.E.; Kaufmann, H.W. (2004). Fortress America: The Forts That Defended America, 1600 to the Present. Da Capo Press. ISBN 978-0-306-81550-8.
- Lewis, Emanuel Raymond (1993). Seacoast Fortifications of the United States: An Introductory History. Annapolis: US Naval Institute Press. ISBN 978-1-55750-502-6.
- McGovern, Terrance C. and Mark A Berhow American Defenses of Corregidor and Manila Bay 1898-1945. Osprey Publishing. ISBN 1-84176-427-2
- Morton, Louis (1953). The Fall of the Philippines. U.S. Army in World War II: The War in the Pacific. Washington, D.C.: United States Army Center of Military History. CMH Pub 5-2. Archived from the original on 2012-01-08. – full text
- Toland, John (1961). But Not in Shame. New American Library.
