= 59th Air Defense Artillery Regiment =

59th Coast Artillery Regiment
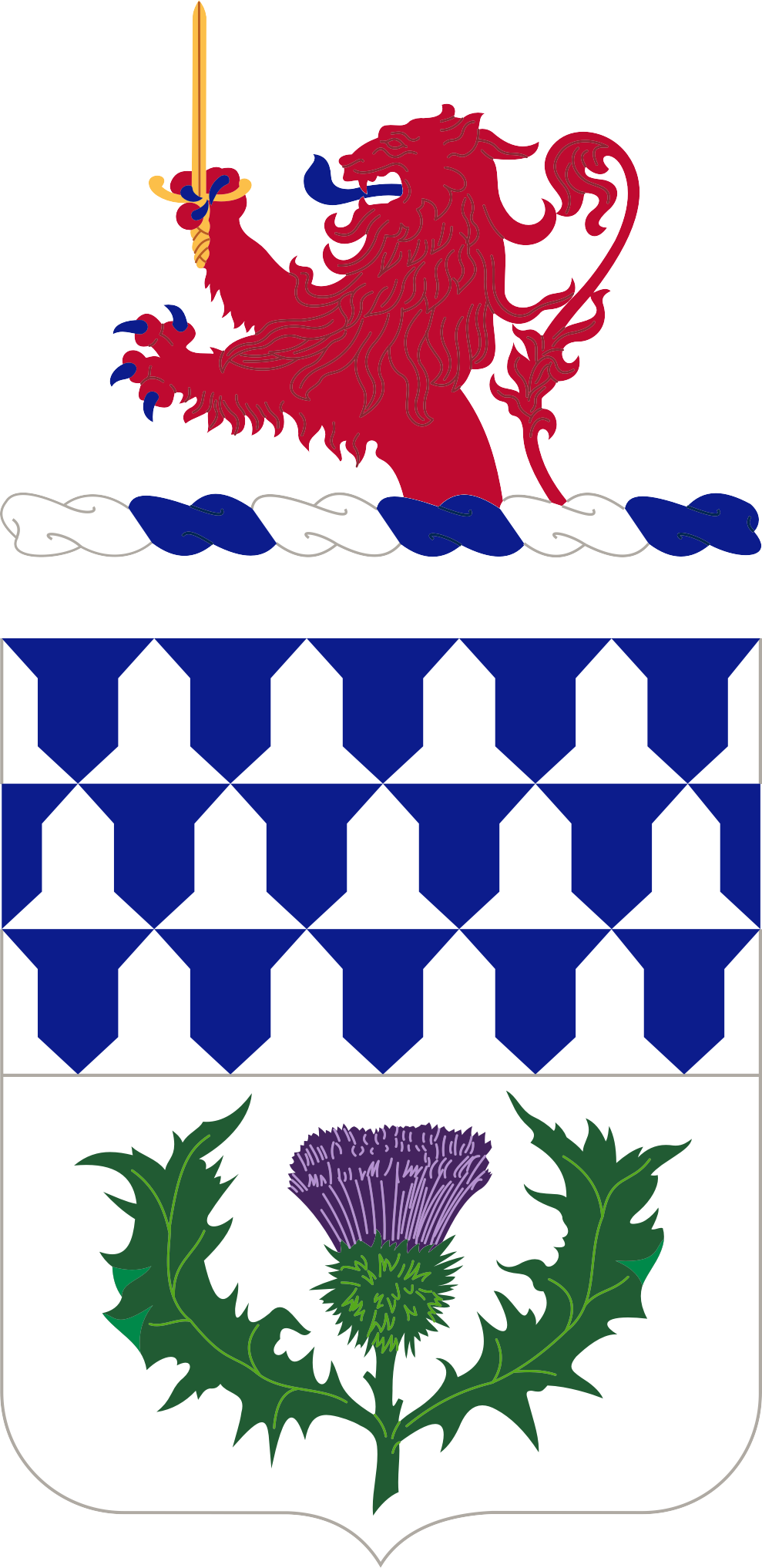
- Coat of arms
- Active: 1917-1946; 1948-1958; 1959-1992
- Country: United States
- Branch: Army
- Type: Air defense artillery
- Size: Regiment
- Motto: Defendimus
- Mascot: Oozlefinch
- Engagements: World War I; Battle of Corregidor
- Decorations: Presidential Unit Citation with two oak leaf clusters Philippine Republic Presidential Unit Citation

Commanders
- Notable commanders: Colonel Paul Bunker

The 59th Coast Artillery Regiment, later the 59th Air Defense Artillery Regiment, was a regiment in the United States Army. It served as a heavy artillery regiment in France in World War I, and was in the Battle of Corregidor, Philippine Islands, in World War II.

== History ==
=== World War I ===
Constituted 1 December 1917 in the Regular Army as the 59th Artillery (Coast Artillery Corps) (CAC) and organized 1 January 1918 at Fort Hamilton, New York from existing Regular Army and New York National Guard Companies of Coast Artillery. Moved to France March 1918, armed there with 24 British-made 8-inch howitzers, served with the 32nd Brigade (CAC) on the Western Front, including support of I and IV Army Corps. The regiment returned to the U.S. via the port of Hoboken, New Jersey, on 24 January 1919 aboard the USS Louisiana and was transferred to Camp Upton, New York, where the National Guard companies were demobilized. On 16 February 1919, the regiment was moved to Fort Winfield Scott, California, and on 6 October 1919, moved to Camp Lewis, Washington.

=== Interwar period ===
The 59th Coast Artillery was reorganized on 1 August 1921 as a 155 mm gun regiment. It was transferred to the Philippine Department on 13 July 1921 and embarked on the troopship USAT Sherman at Tacoma, Washington. It arrived on 13 August 1921 at Manila, Philippines. Concurrently, the regiment was transferred to the Middleside Barracks at Fort Mills, and assigned to the Harbor Defenses of Manila and Subic Bays.

It was relieved in September 1921 from the 31st Coast Artillery Brigade. All elements of the regiment except the Headquarters and Headquarters Battery and Batteries A and B were inactivated on 30 September 1922 at Fort Mills. Batteries G and H were organized on 11 October 1922 with Philippine Scouts personnel at Fort Mills. The regiment was redesignated on 30 June 1924 as the 59th Coast Artillery Regiment (Heavy Tractor), and concurrently Batteries C, D, E, and F were organized at Fort Mills. Concurrently, the Philippine Scout personnel were transferred to the 92nd Coast Artillery, and Batteries G and H inactivated. The crew of the U.S. Army mine planter Colonel George F.E. Harrison was assigned to the Headquarters Battery from 30 June 1924 to 31 August 1927.

The regiment was again redesignated on 28 April 1926 as the 59th Coast Artillery Regiment (Tractor Drawn). Although the 59th Coast Artillery was nominally designated as a tractor-drawn 155 mm gun regiment, its subordinate batteries were used to man the fixed harbor defense positions at Forts Mills, Hughes, Frank, and Drum in Manila Harbor and at Fort Wint in Subic Bay. It was awarded the U.S. Coast Artillery Association Trophy for Regular Army regiments for 1935, 1936, and 1937. The Headquarters and Headquarters Batteries of the subordinate battalions were activated on 20 May 1941 at Fort Mills.

=== World War II ===
During the Philippines campaign (1941–1942) the regiment garrisoned much of the Harbor Defenses of Manila and Subic Bays, along with the 91st and 92nd Coast Artillery of the Philippine Scouts. Its commander in World War II was Colonel Paul Bunker. It operated at least the following batteries, at Fort Mills, Corregidor unless otherwise noted:

- Battery A - Battery Hearn
- Battery B - Battery Crockett
- Battery C - Battery Wheeler
- Battery D - Battery Cheney
- Battery E - Fort Drum (El Fraile Island)
- Battery F - Battery Smith
- Battery G - Fort Hughes
- Battery H - Battery Geary
- Battery I (Antiaircraft) - Fort Hughes
- Battery K - Battery James

== Lineage ==
- (Service Battery; Headquarters Detachment and Combat train, 1st, 2nd and 3rd Battalions inactivated 30 September 1922 at Fort Mills, Corregidor, Philippine Islands, in the Harbor Defenses of Manila and Subic Bays. Batteries G, and H activated 11 October 1922 at Fort Mills). Redesignated 20 February 1924 as the 59th Coast Artillery (Tractor Drawn); Concurrently batteries C, D, E, and F activated at Fort Mills. In 1935 the regiment was reorganized and redesignated as Harbor Defense. Remainder of regiment activated 30 May 1941 at Fort Mills.
- Heavily engaged in the Battle of Corregidor and other engagements of the Philippines campaign (1941–1942); surrendered 6 May 1942 to Japanese forces on Corregidor Island, Philippine Islands.
- Inactivated 2 April 1946 at Fort Mills.
- Redesignated 26 December 1947 as the 59th Antiaircraft Artillery Automatic Weapons Battalion and activated 1 January 1948 at Fort Bliss, Texas.
- Redesignated 24 February 1953 as the 59th Antiaircraft Artillery Battalion. Inactivated 1 September 1958 at Fort Bliss.
- Reorganized and redesignated 31 July 1959 as the 59th Artillery, a parent regiment under the Combat Arms Regimental System.
- Redesignated 1 September 1971 as the 59th Air Defense Artillery. Inactivated in 1992.

== Distinctive unit insignia ==
- Description

A gold color metal and enamel device 1 1/8 in (2.86 cm) in height overall consisting of a shield blazoned: Per fess vair and Argent, in base a thistle Proper. Attached above from a wreath Argent and Azure a demi-lion rampant Gules grasping in dexter claw a sword Or. Attached above and to the sides of the shield a Gold scroll inscribed "defendimus" in Red letters.

- Symbolism

The vair on the shield is from the arms of the Coast Defenses of Southern New York, the thistle is one of the emblems of Lorraine and is borne on the arms of Nancy not far from Saint-Mihiel. The crest is taken from the arms of St. Menehould in red for Artillery. The motto translates to "We Defend."

- Background

The distinctive unit insignia was originally approved for the 59th Artillery Regiment on 15 August 1930. It was redesignated for the 59th Antiaircraft Artillery Battalion (Automatic Weapons) on 23 November 1953. The insignia was redesignated for the 59th Artillery Regiment on 5 December 1958. It was redesignated effective 1 September 1971, for the 59th Air Defense Artillery Regiment.

== Coat of arms ==
=== Blazon ===
- Shield

Per fess vair and Argent, in base a thistle Proper.

- Crest

On a wreath Argent and Azure a demi-lion rampant Gules armed and langued of the second grasping in dexter claw a sword Or. Motto: DEFENDIMUS (We Defend).

=== Symbolism ===
- Shield

The vair on the shield is from the arms of the Coast Defenses of New York, the thistle is one of the emblems of Lorraine and is borne on the arms of Nancy not far from St. Mihiel.

- Crest

The crest it taken from the arms of St. Menehould in red for Artillery.

=== Background ===
The coat of arms was originally approved for the 59th Artillery Regiment on 1 April 1921. It was amended to correct the motto on 28 April 1927. It was redesignated for the 59th Antiaircraft Artillery Automatic Weapons Battalion on 21 April 1949. The insignia was redesignated for the 59th Antiaircraft Artillery Battalion (Automatic Weapons) on 23 November 1953. It was redesignated for the 59th Artillery Regiment on 5 December 1958. It was redesignated effective 1 September 1971, for the 59th Air Defense Artillery Regiment.

== Campaign streamers ==
World War I

- St Mihiel
- Meuse-Argonne
- Lorraine 1918

World War II

- Philippine Islands

== Decorations ==
- Presidential Unit Citation (Army), Streamer Embroidered BATAAN (59th CA cited for period 29 Dec. 1941- 28 Feb. 1942)
- Presidential Unit Citation (Army), Streamer Embroidered MANILA AND SUBIC BAYS (59th CA cited for period 14 March- 9 April 1942)
- Presidential Unit Citation (Army), Streamer Embroidered DEFENSE OF THE PHILIPPINES (59th CA cited for period 7 Dec. 1941- 10 May 1942)
- Philippine Presidential Unit Citation (7 DECEMBER 1941 TO 10 MAY 1942)

== See also ==
- Air Defense Artillery Branch
- Philippines campaign (1941–1942)
- Fort Drum (El Fraile Island)
- Seacoast defense in the United States
- United States Army Coast Artillery Corps
- Harbor Defense Command
