= Lourdes Reyes Besa =

Filipino philanthropist and social advocate

Lourdes "Lulu" Reyes Besa was a philanthropist and social advocate born in Jaro, Iloilo. She was raised in Manila, Philippines by her parents Judge Ponciano Reyes and Luz Jugo Reyes. As president of the Chaplains’ Aid Association (1942–45), Lulu headed the Crusades for Charity and brought medicines to American and Filipino POWs in Japanese-run internment camps in the Philippines. For her service, she was awarded the Medal of Freedom twice — on August 11, 1947, and September 24, 1947. Major General George F. Moore, commander of the Harbor Defenses of Manila and Subic Bays during the Japanese invasion in 1941, praised her as “one of the outstanding heroines of World War II."

In 1946, Lourdes co-founded the YLAC (Young Ladies’ Association of Charity) with Aurora Quezon. She later became president of the organization, which built faith-based elementary schools that provided education throughout the Philippines. In 1953, Lulu Reyes Besa received the Ateneo University’s Ozanam Award for her social action achievements. That same year, Lulu raised money for the construction of the National Shrine of Our Mother of Perpetual Help, in Baclaran, Pasay.

In recognition of her civil service, she received the Fleur de Lis Award in 1962 from her alma mater St. Paul's College of Manila (now St. Paul University). Additionally, she was honored with the Papal Award Order of the Holy Sepulcher for her charitable contributions to works with the Catholic church and the religious community. Lulu Reyes Besa lived in Tarlac, Tarlac throughout her married life with Gualberto S. Besa (+) and their daughters, Elizabeth Ann and Maria Isabel, until her death on March 14, 1981.
