= Paul Bunker =

American football player and soldier (1881–1943)

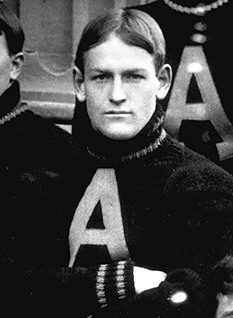

Profile
- Position: Halfback/Tackle

Personal information
- Born: May 7, 1881; Alpena, Michigan, U.S.
- Died: March 16, 1943 (aged 61); Formosa
- Listed height: 5 ft 11 in (1.80 m)
- Listed weight: 186 lb (84 kg)

Career information
- College: Army (1901–1902)

Awards and highlights
- Distinguished Service Medal, 1944 (posthumous); 2× Consensus All-American (1901, 1902)
- College Football Hall of Fame

Paul Delmont Bunker (May 7, 1881 – March 16, 1943) was an American football player and soldier. Bunker attended the U.S. Military Academy and became the first football player at West Point to be selected as a first-team All-American by Walter Camp. Bunker was chosen as an All-American at the tackle position in 1901 and repeated as an All-American in 1902, but as a halfback. He served in the U.S. Army for 40 years and was in command of the coastal artillery forces in the Battle of Corregidor. On the fall of Corregidor, Bunker became a prisoner of war. He died of starvation and disease in a Japanese prison camp in 1943 after losing 70 pounds at the age of 61. His posthumously published journal, Paul Bunker's Diary, became a best-seller. He was elected to the College Football Hall of Fame in 1969.

== U.S. Military Academy ==
=== All-American football player ===
Born in Alpena, Michigan, Bunker enrolled at the U.S. Military Academy at West Point, New York. At West Point, Bunker played at the tackle and halfback positions on the academy's football team from 1899-1902. One writer summarized Bunker's football career at West Point as follows:

A steel-chested, tow-haired, rugged tackle tipping the scales well over 215 pounds, Bunker made the cadet varsity as a plebe in 1899 and played without relief throughout the 1900, '01 and '02 grid campaigns. ... He was not the colorful elusive runner so prominent in football today, but depended on bull strength and a pair of piston-like legs that consistently sent him through the center of the line for three, four and five yards at a clip.

At West Point, Bunker was a classmate of Gen. Douglas MacArthur. MacArthur also served as the manager of the Army football team in 1902 when Bunker was at his peak. Bunker was selected by Walter Camp as a member of the 1901 and 1902 College Football All-America Teams. Bunker is one of a handful of athletes to win All-America honors at two different positions. He was selected as an All-American tackle in 1901 and as a halfback in 1902.

In 2008, Sports Illustrated sought to identify the college football players who would have likely won the Heisman Trophy as the best player in the sport during each of the years before the award's inception in 1935. Sports Illustrated selected Bunker as the retroactive Heisman Trophy winner for 1902.

=== Hazing investigation ===
In 1901, following the death of Oscar Booz, the U.S. Congress appointed a committee to investigate hazing at the U.S. Military Academy. Upperclassmen in the academy were accused of engaging in dangerous hazing activities with the first-year students, known as "plebes." Bunker, well known to the public for his accomplishments in football, became one of the subjects of the investigation. Some of the plebes told the Congressional committee conducting the investigation that Bunker had forced them to consume tabasco sauce. Bunker acknowledged having braced some of the plebes, but denied ever having given more than fifteen drops of sauce to any one. Bunker testified that his hazing activities were confined to bracing, "making men sing out their wash lists to popular airs, ride broomsticks, stand on their heads and charge sparrows with fixed bayonets." The investigation led to a ban on all hazing at the academy and was the subject of the 1999 book, "Bullies and Cowards: The West Point Hazing Scandal, 1898-1901."

== Military career ==
After graduating from the Military Academy in 1903, Bunker went on to a 40-year career in the United States Army Coast Artillery Corps. In 1915, Bunker was assigned to a position with a coast artillery regiment at Fort Mills on Corregidor Island in the Philippines. Bunker later served as commander of Fort Amador in Panama 1919–1921. In 1925, he graduated from the Command and General Staff School. In 1927, Bunker was charged with setting up an impregnable defense for the city of New York during a tour of duty at Fort Totten in Willets Point, New York. In 1937, he was assigned to a coast artillery unit at Fort MacArthur in San Pedro, Los Angeles, California.

== Capture and death in Japanese prison camp ==
In 1940, Bunker, then a colonel, returned to the Philippines and assumed command the 59th Coast Artillery Regiment (United States) at Fort Hughes in Manila Bay, soon transferring to Fort Mills on Corregidor. There, Bunker was reunited with his West Point classmate, Gen. Douglas MacArthur, and was involved in the tragic sinking of the ferry SS Corregidor in which more than 1,000, mostly Filipinos, lost their lives: Bunker reportedly refused to deactivate the electrically controlled minefield the ship was violating in its run to bring to safety evacuees from Manila to Mindanao, including Philippine legislators and military personnel.

Following the Japanese military offensive against the Philippines, President Roosevelt ordered MacArthur to evacuate the islands. MacArthur reluctantly left, promising to send reinforcements that never came. In his autobiography, MacArthur recalled one of his last memories on leaving the Philippines was of Bunker:

On the dock I could see the men staring at me. I had lost 25 pounds living on the same diet as the soldiers, and I must have looked gaunt and ghastly standing there in my old war-stained clothes - no bemedaled commander of inspiring presence. ... Through the shattered ruins, my eyes sought 'Topside,' where the deep roar of heavy guns still growled defiance, with their red blasts tearing the growing darkness asunder. Up there, in command, was my classmate, Paul Bunker. Forty years had passed since Bunker had twice been selected by Walter Camp for the All American team. I could shut my eyes and see again that blond head racing, tearing, plunging - 210 pounds of irresistible power. I could almost hear Quarterback Charley Daly's shrill voice barking, 'Bunker back.' He and many others up there were old, old friends, bound by ties of deepest friendship.

Bunker remained in command of the coastal artillery in Manila Bay during the Battle of Corregidor. On May 5, 1942, the battle came to an end when the half-starved U.S. forces commanded by Gen. Wainwright surrendered after an heroic last-ditch stand. Bunker, at age 61, became a prisoner of war and died of starvation and disease in a Japanese prison camp at Karenko, Taiwan. Fellow prisoners recalled that Bunker went from 220 pounds down to 150 pounds prior to his death.

== Preservation of the U.S. flag from Corregidor ==
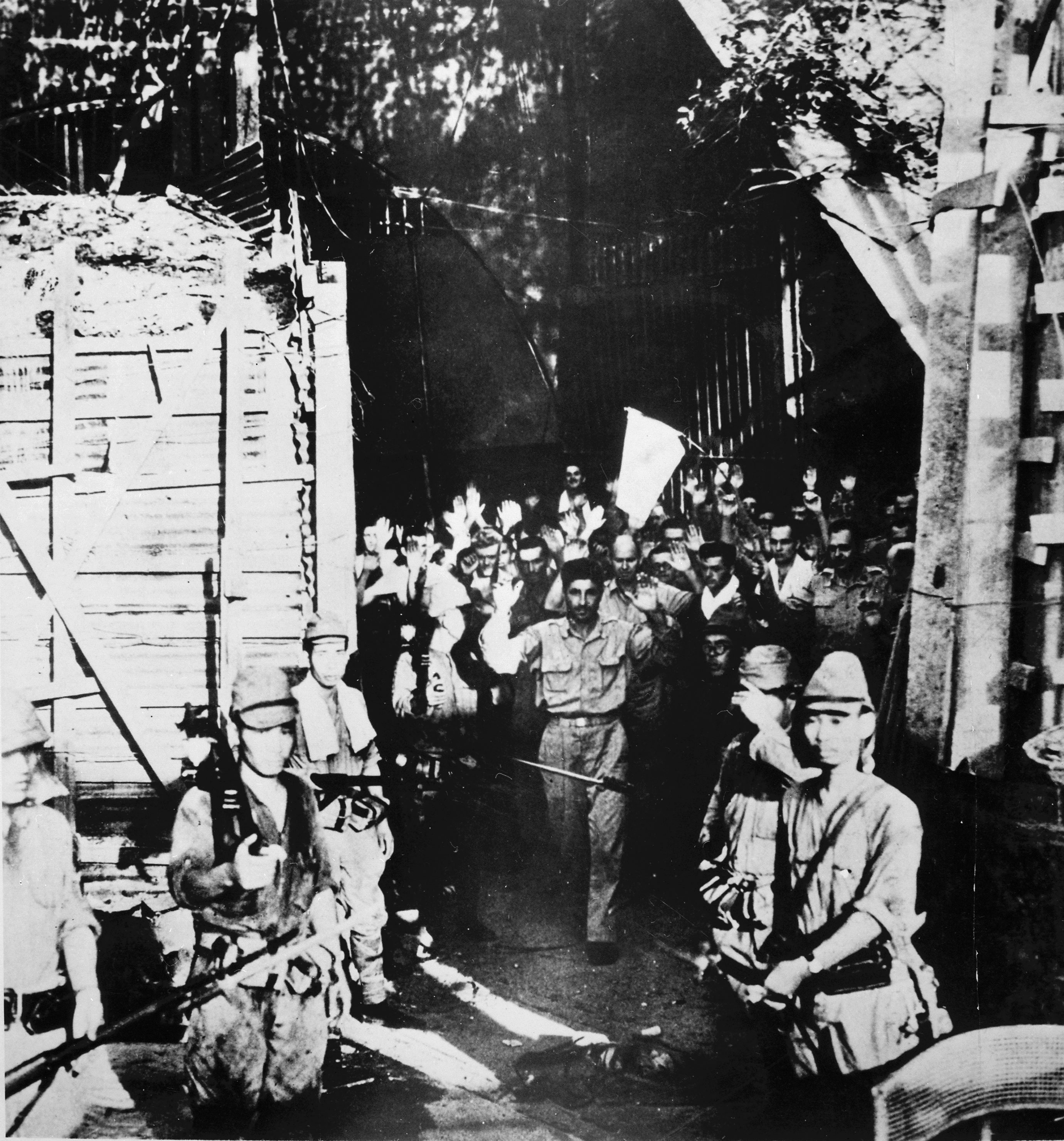
Surrender of U.S. forces at Corregidor.

In May 1942, when Gen. Wainwright decided to surrender at Corregidor, he ordered Bunker to lower the U.S. flag and burn it to prevent its falling into the hands of the Japanese forces. Wainwright later recalled, "Promptly at noon this May 6, 1942, I ordered the white flag run up and our firing ceased. It was with the sickest of feelings that I gave the white-flag-raising order to Colonel Paul D. Bunker." Instead of burning the entire flag, Bunker cut off a piece and concealed it under a patch on his shirt. Before he died in the Japanese prison camp, Bunker sent for Colonel Delbert Ausmus, cut the flag remnant into two pieces and gave one of the pieces to Ausmus. He told Colonel Ausmus he did not expect to survive the prison camp and that it was Ausmus' duty to take his piece of the flag to the Secretary of War. Ausmus concealed the remnant in his shirt cuff, and shortly after the war ended, Ausmus delivered it to Secretary Patterson. In November 1945, Ausmus described the circumstances under which he received the remnant from Bunker:

He was taken to Billibid prison in Manila and came down with pneumonia. While he was in the hospital Col. Paul D. Bunker of Taunton, Mass., was brought in suffering from seriously infected blisters on his feet and blood poisoning in one leg. On June 10, Bunker watching carefully 'to see that there were no Japs near,' swore him to secrecy, Ausmus continued, and 'said he wanted to turn something over to me to deliver to the Secretary of War.' From beneath a false patch set into the left pocket of his shirt Bunker took a bit of red cloth. Solemnly he gave Ausmus part of it and put the rest back.

While giving one piece of the flag to Ausmus, he held onto another piece until the time of his death. Gen. Wainwright later recalled the circumstances of Bunker's death in the prison camp, still holding onto the remnant: "He must have suffered ... constant pain of hunger ... I sat with him for a part of the last two hours of his life ... [He was] cremated in the rags in which he had carefully sewn a bit of the American flag he had pulled down in Corregidor."

Ausmus did deliver it to the Secretary of War who unveiled it during a speech on the event of Flag Day in June 1946. The remnant of the U.S. flag from Corregidor saved by Bunker and Ausmus is on display in the West Point museum.

== Posthumous honors ==
In 1944, Bunker was posthumously awarded the Distinguished Service Medal for exceptionally meritorious service at Corregidor. The citation read:

His courageous and incessent [sic] devotion to duty in directing the activities of his batteries and in supervising the immediate repair of damage inflicted by Enemy bombardment was outstanding. Colonel Bunker's outstanding leadership maintained superior morale and efficiency in his command through the campaign.

Bunker's 190-page diary of his time on Corregidor was published posthumously under the title Paul Bunker's War and became a best-seller.

In June 1946, one of the U.S. Army's 16-inch coastal artillery batteries located at Fort MacArthur was renamed Battery Paul D. Bunker, BCN-127 to honor Bunker's memory.

His remains were interred with full military honors at the West Point Cemetery on April 8, 1948.

Bunker Road, which is carried through the Baker–Barry Tunnel between Forts Baker and Barry in what is now the Golden Gate National Recreation Area, is named for Col. Bunker.

An intersection in Boston, Massachusetts near the Fort Point Channel was named as Paul Bunker Square at some time after World War II.

He was posthumously inducted into the College Football Hall of Fame in 1969.

== Awards ==
- Distinguished Service Medal (posthumous)
- Prisoner of War Medal (posthumous)
- World War I Victory Medal
- American Defense Service Medal
- Asiatic-Pacific Campaign Medal (posthumous)
- World War II Victory Medal (posthumous)
- Philippine Defense Medal (posthumous)

== Personal ==
Bunker married Leila Landon Beehler, the daughter of Navy Commodore William Henry Beehler. They had two sons, a daughter and six grandchildren. Their eldest son Paul Delmont Bunker Jr. was a 1932 West Point graduate and Army Air Corps officer who died in a 1938 plane crash. Their other son William Beehler Bunker was a 1934 West Point graduate who attained the rank of lieutenant general.
