= 92nd Coast Artillery (United States) =

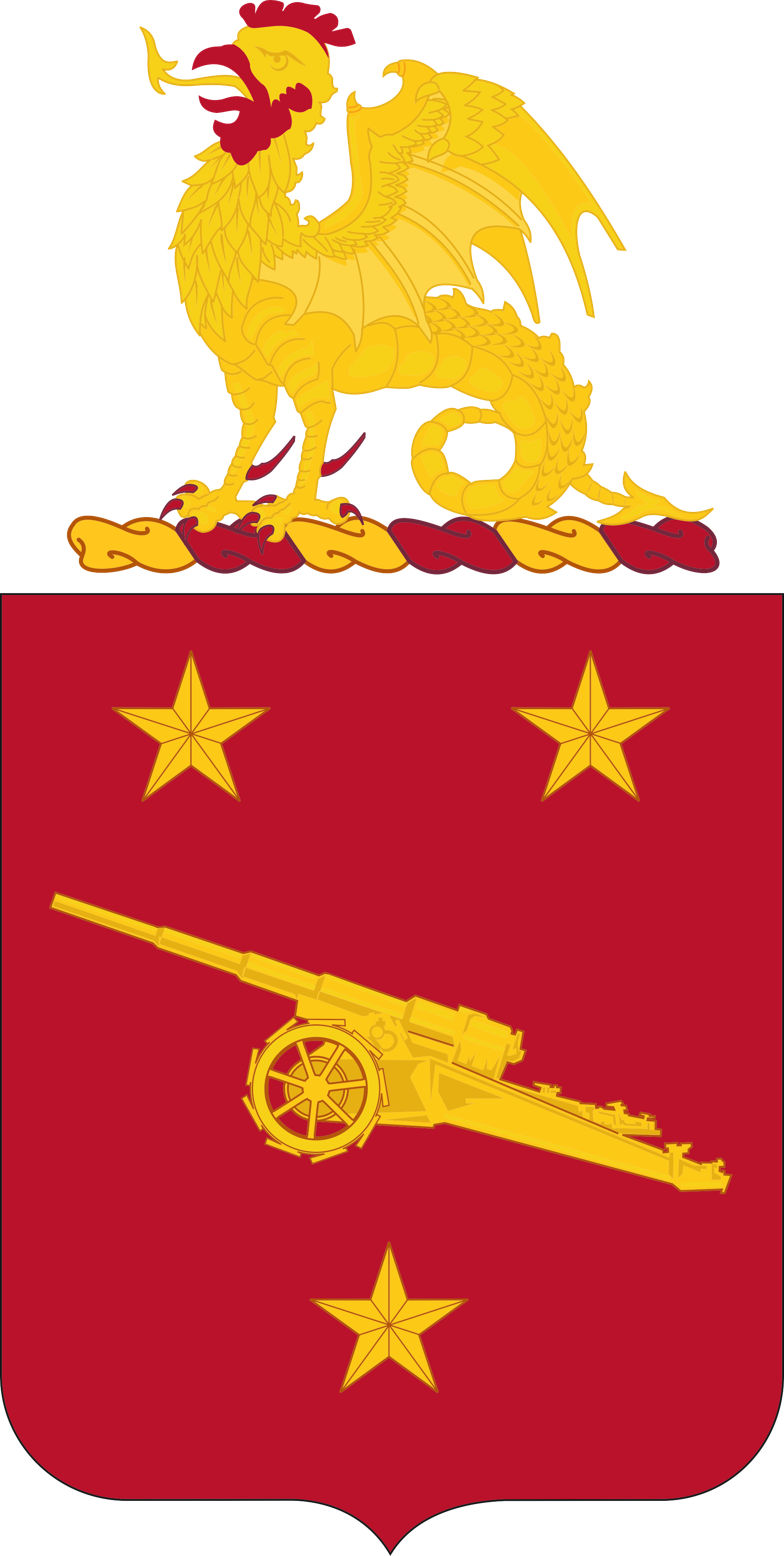
- Coat of arms
- Active: 1924-1942
- Country: United States
- Branch: Army
- Type: Coast artillery
- Garrison/HQ: Fort Mills
- Motto: "Always Ready"
- Colors: Scarlet
- Mascot: Oozlefinch

Commanders
- Notable commanders: Colonel Octave De Carre

The 92nd Coast Artillery Regiment was a Coast Artillery Corps regiment in the United States Army, part of the Philippine Scouts. It was a Regular Army unit composed primarily of Filipino enlisted men and US officers.

== History ==
The regiment was constituted February 1924 as 92nd CA (HD) Regt (PS) and organized 7-1-24 at Fort Mills by redesignating 278th, 280th, 283rd, 287th, 288th, 275th, & 289th Cos, (PS)(organized 12-18-22) as HHB and Btrys A-F. During the Philippines campaign (1941–1942) the regiment was equipped primarily with Canon de 155mm GPF tractor drawn guns. It manned the following batteries, at Fort Mills, Corregidor unless otherwise noted:

- A Battery (Fort Wint) Beach defense
- B Battery
- C Battery Kysor
- D Battery Levagood
- E Battery Ordnance Point
- F Battery Frank North (Fort Frank)
- G Battery Monja

1st Battalion (Batteries A & B), 2nd Battalion (Batteries C & D), manned fixed and mobile seacoast guns. 3rd Bn (Bilibid Guard Bn) provided guard for the post stockade and guard details for Bilibid convict work gangs on Corregidor and other fortified islands. Redesignated TD regiment 1935. Btrys G and H activated 4-28-41 at Ft. Mills and regiment reorganized. The 1st Battalion composed of Batteries A-D; 2nd Battalion composed of Batteries E & F (Guard Bn) and 3rd Battalion to be composed of Batteries G & H. Organization of Battery H not complete when World War II started and personnel merged into other components of regiment. Regiment surrendered 5-6-42 after the end of the Battle of Corregidor, disbanded 6-28-50.

== Distinctive unit insignia ==
- Description

A Gold color metal and enamel device 1 1/4 inches (3.2 cm) in height overall consisting of a shield blazoned: Gules, a 155-mm gun with carriage Proper between three mullets Or. Above the shield from a wreath Or and Gules, a cockatrice Or, armed, jelloped and crested Gules. Attached below the shield a Red scroll inscribed “ALWAYS READY” in Gold letters.

- Symbolism

The shield is red for Artillery. The gun represents the arm or weapon, and the three mullets are taken from the Philippine flag. The unit being allocated to the Philippine Islands, uses a cockatrice for a crest. Corregidor Island is symbolized by a fighting cock; the island is surrounded by the China Sea, and China is usually symbolized by a dragon; therefore, the cockatrice - half cock and half dragon - is symbolic of the location of the organization in the Philippines.

- Background

The distinctive unit insignia was approved on 10 December 1937. It was rescinded/canceled on 14 March 1975.

== Coat of arms ==
- Blazon
  - Shield: Gules, a 155-mm gun with carriage Proper between three mullets Or.
  - Crest: On a wreath of the colors Or and Gules, a cockatrice Or, armed, jelloped and crested Gules.
  - Motto: ALWAYS READY.
- Symbolism
  - Shield: The shield is red for Artillery. The gun represents the arm or weapon, and the three mullets are taken from the Philippine flag.
  - Crest: The unit being allocated to the Philippine Islands, uses a cockatrice for a crest. Corregidor Island is symbolized by a fighting cock; the island is surrounded by the China Sea, and China is usually symbolized by a dragon; therefore, the cockatrice - half cock and half dragon - is symbolic of the location of the organization in the Philippines.
- Background: The coat of arms was approved on 22 March 1927. It was rescinded/canceled on 14 March 1975.

== Decorations ==
- Presidential Unit Citation with 2 Bronze Oak Leaf clusters
- Prisoner of War Medal (World War II only)
