= 60th Air Defense Artillery Regiment =

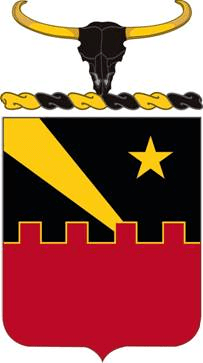
- Coat of arms
- Active: 1917 – Present
- Country: United States
- Branch: Army
- Type: Air defense artillery
- Motto: "Coelis Imperamus" (We Rule The Heavens)
- Engagements: World War II: Battle of Bataan; Battle of Corregidor
- Decorations: Presidential Unit Citation with two oak leaf clusters Meritorious Unit Commendation; Philippine Republic Presidential Unit Citation

Insignia
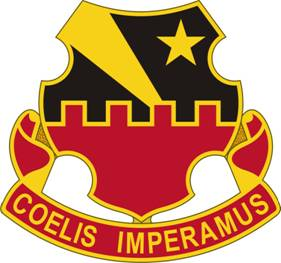
- Distinctive unit insignia

The 60th Air Defense Artillery Regiment is an air defense unit of the United States Army.

== History ==
=== World War I ===
The regiment was constituted on 23 December 1917 in the Regular Army as the 60th Artillery, Coast Artillery Corps and organized at Fort Monroe, Virginia, comprising Regular Army companies and National Guard companies from Virginia and the District of Columbia. The regiment was sent to France to fight with the American Expeditionary Forces on the Western Front in World War I, participating in the Battle of Saint-Mihiel and the Meuse-Argonne Offensive armed with 24 155 mm GPF guns. One of the leaders of the artillery was Colonel Elmer J.Wallace. Almost six weeks into the Meuse-Argonne Offensive, he was badly wounded by gunshot and later died in hospital. He is notably the only colonel part of the Coast Artillery Corps during WW1 that was killed in battle. It was demobilized on 24 February 1919 at Fort Washington, with its National Guard companies reverting to state control.

=== Interwar period and World War II ===
The regiment was reconstituted on 26 October 1922 in the Regular Army as the 60th Artillery Battalion, Antiaircraft and organized at Fort Crockett, Texas. It was expanded, reorganized, and redesignated as the 60th Coast Artillery, with 1st Battalion organized at Fort William McKinley in Manila, Philippine Islands. The regimental headquarters was activated at the fort on 31 August 1925, with the 1st Battalion, without Batteries A and B, being simultaneously inactivated, and Battery E activated at the fort. On 1 April 1929, 1st Battalion and Battery F were activated at Fort Mills on Corregidor. The rest of the regiment was activated at Fort Mills on 30 May 1941.

It was part of USAFFE's Harbor Defenses of Manila and Subic Bays, under the Philippine Coast Artillery Command. The 60th was to provide air defense over Manila Bay and the southern tip of the Bataan Peninsula, and was equipped with 3-inch guns (an older model with a vertical range of 8,200 m), 37mm Guns, .50-caliber machine guns, and 60-inch (1.5 m) Sperry searchlights. A battery, with a platoon of searchlights, was located at Fort Wint, in Subic Bay. Following the Attack on Pearl Harbor on 7 December of that year, the Japanese invaded the Philippines. The regiment served in the Battle of Bataan and the Battle of Corregidor, and surrendered to the Japanese at the end of the latter on 6 May 1942. However, the 60th was not officially inactivated until 2 April 1946.

=== Cold War and parent regiment ===
On 1 August 1946, it was redesignated as the 60th Antiaircraft Artillery Automatic Weapons Battalion and activated at Fort Bliss, Texas. It was redesignated as the 60th Antiaircraft Artillery Battalion Automatic Weapons Battalion, Mobile on 7 December 1949, and became simply the 60th Antiaircraft Artillery Battalion on 27 July 1950. The 60th was again inactivated on 17 June 1957 at Southampton, England. On 31 July 1959, it was reorganized and redesignated as the 60th Artillery, a parent regiment under the Combat Arms Regimental System. The regiment was redesignated as the 60th Air Defense Artillery on 1 September 1971.

==== Battery B and 1st Battalion ====
The unit that became Battery B was constituted on 8 March 1898 in the Regular Army as Battery G, 7th Regiment of Artillery, and organized on 29 March at Fort Slocum. On 13 February 1901, it was reorganized and redesignated as the 77th Company, Coast Artillery, Artillery Corps. It became the 77th Company, Coast Artillery Corps on 2 February 1907, and was redesignated as the 3d Company, Fort Barrancas on 6 July 1916. It became the 3d Company, Coast Defenses of Pensacola on 31 August 1917, and was disbanded at Pensacola on 30 November 1919.

On 1 June 1922, the company was reconstituted in the Regular Army, and at the same time consolidated with the active 3rd Company, Coast Defenses of Key West (organized at Key West on 9 August 1921) to become the 77th Company, Coast Artillery Corps. On 26 October 1922, it was reorganized and redesignated as Battery B, 60th Artillery Battalion (Antiaircraft). The battery served with the unit, surrendering with it at Corregidor, and was inactivated along with the rest of the regiment in 1946. The battery was reactivated at Fort Bliss with the 60th Battalion in 1946, and inactivated at Southampton with it on 17 June 1957.

On 12 August 1958, it was redesignated as the Headquarters and Headquarters Battery, 1st Missile Battalion, 60th Artillery, with its organic elements simultaneously constituted. The battalion was activated on 1 September 1958 at Gary, and dropped the Missile designation on 20 December 1965. It was redesignated on 1 September 1971 as the 1st Battalion, 60th Air Defense Artillery, before being inactivated on 30 September 1974 at Munster, Indiana.

==== Battery C and 2nd Battalion ====
The unit that became Battery C was constituted on 8 March 1898 as Battery K, 7th Regiment of Artillery, and organized on 29 March at Fort Slocum. On 13 February 1901, it was reorganized and redesignated as the 80th Company, Coast Artillery, Artillery Corps. On 2 February 1907, it transferred to the new Coast Artillery Corps. It became the 1st Company, Key West Barracks on 6 July 1916, and transferred to the Coast Defenses of Key West on 31 August 1917. It became 80th Company of the CAC again on 1 June 1922. On 26 October, it was consolidated with Battery C, 60th Artillery (Coast Artillery Corps) to become Battery C, 60th Artillery Battalion (Anti-Aircraft). It served with the regiment and was inactivated on 31 August 1925 at Fort William McKinley. Reactivated on 1 April 1929 at Fort Mills, it surrendered on Corregidor and was inactivated along with the rest of the 60th. The battery was reactivated at Fort Bliss with the 60th Battalion in 1946, and inactivated at Southampton with it on 17 June 1957.

On 12 August 1958, it was redesignated as the Headquarters and Headquarters Battery, 2nd Missile Battalion, 60th Artillery, with its organic elements simultaneously constituted. The battalion was activated on 1 September 1958 at Nike Missile Base C-54 (Orland Park, Illinois), as a Nike Ajax missile-equipped unit, part of the Chicago-Gary Defense Area. Battery A was at Base C-49 (Homewood), Battery C at Base C-46 (Munster), and Battery D at Base C-84 (near Barrington). It later became a Nike-Hercules unit, after which Battery D moved to Base C-61 (Lemont). The battalion inactivated at Base C-54 on 15 December 1961.

On 12 January 1970, it was activated at Fort Bliss as the 2nd Battalion, 60th Artillery (60th Air Defense Artillery from 1 September 1971). After training at Fort Bliss, the battalion was deployed to Europe in the summer of 1970, part of the 32d US Army Air Defense Command. It became part of the 108th Air Defense Artillery Group in 1974, which became the 108th Air Defense Artillery Brigade in 1982. Armed with the short range M167A1 towed Vulcan Air Defense System and long range MIM-72 Chaparral surface-to-air missile launcher, the battalion provided airbase defense for Ramstein Air Base. It included three firing batteries, each with four firing platoons (two Vulcan and two Chaparral), eight Vulcans, and eight Chaparrals.

A Battery was initially located at Husterhoeh Kaserne and Zweibrücken Air Base, and eventually was completely relocated to the latter. Headquarters & Headquarters Battery, the 92d Ordnance Detachment, and B Battery were located at Ramstein, while C Battery at Daenner Kaserne defended the Kaiserslautern Army Depot. On 8 January 1985, the battalion was relieved from its assignment to the 108th Brigade and transferred to the 94th Air Defense Artillery Brigade, swapping places with the 94th's 2nd Battalion, 62d Air Defense Artillery.

== Heraldic items ==
=== Coat of arms ===
- Blazon
  - Shield: Per fess embattled Sable and Gules fimbriated Or a pile in bend of the third the lower portion obscured by the second tincture, in sinister chief a mullet of the third.
  - Crest: On a wreath of the colors Or and Sable a carabao skull Sable horned Or.
  - Motto: Coelis Imperamus (We Rule The Heavens).
- Symbolism
  - Shield:The shield is divided horizontally into two parts, the dividing line being embattled to represent defense. The lower half is red for Artillery; the upper half bears the colors of black and gold, significant of the Orient where the unit had its pioneer service. A searchlight beam pierces the darkness of this portion of the shield signifying the never ending vigilance which this organization exercises in searching for enemy aircraft. The star has a double significance. It is symbolic of the state of Texas, the Lone Star State, where the unit was reorganized after World War I, and its battleground in the heavens.
  - Crest The carabao horns are symbolic of service in the Philippine Islands where the 60th Battalion, Coast Artillery Corps served.
- Background: The coat of arms was originally approved for the 60th Coast Artillery Regiment on 1924-05-21. It was amended to change the blazon of the shield and correct the motto on 1924-10-03. It was redesignated for the 60th Antiaircraft Artillery Automatic Weapons Battalion and amended to correct the description on 1949-11-16. The insignia was redesignated for the 60th Antiaircraft Artillery Battalion (Automatic Weapons) on 1954-09-08. It was redesignated for the 60th Artillery Regiment on 1958-12-15. It was redesignated for the 60th Air Defense Artillery Regiment effective 1971-09-01.

=== Distinctive unit insignia ===
- Description: A Gold color metal and enamel device 1 1/8 inches (2.9 cm) in height overall blazoned as follows: Per fess embattled Sable and Gules fimbriated Or a pile in bend of the third the lower portion obscured by the second tincture, in sinister chief a mullet of the third. Attached below and to the sides a Red scroll inscribed "COELIS IMPERAMUS" in Gold letters.
- Symbolism: The insignia is divided horizontally into two parts, the dividing line being embattled to represent defense. The lower half is red for Artillery; the upper half bears the colors of black and gold, significant of the Orient where the unit had its pioneer service. A searchlight beam pierces the darkness of this portion, signifying the never ending vigilance which this organization exercises in searching for enemy aircraft. The star has a double significance. It is symbolic of the state of Texas, the Lone Star State, where the unit was reorganized after World War I, and its battleground in the heavens. The motto translates to "We Rule the Heavens".
- Background: The distinctive unit insignia was originally approved for the 60th Coast Artillery Regiment on 1924-05-31. It was amended to correct the motto on 1924-10-03. It was redesignated for the 60th Antiaircraft Artillery Automatic Weapons Battalion and amended to correct the description on 1949-11-16. The insignia was redesignated for the 60th Antiaircraft Artillery Battalion (Automatic Weapons) on 1954-09-08. It was redesignated for the 60th Artillery Regiment on 1958-12-15. It was redesignated for the 60th Air Defense Artillery Regiment effective 1971-09-01.

== Campaign streamers ==
World War I

- St. Mihiel
- Meuse-Argonne

World War II

- Philippine Islands

== Decorations ==
- Presidential Unit Citation (Army) Streamer Embroidered BATAAN
- Presidential Unit Citation (Army) Streamer Embroidered MANILA AND SUBIC BAYS
- Presidential Unit Citation (Army) Streamer Embroidered DEFENSE OF THE PHILIPPINES
- Meritorious Unit Commendation Streamer embroidered VIETNAM 1967-1968
- Philippine Presidential Unit Citation Streamer Embroidered 7 December 1941 TO 10 May 1942

== See also ==
- 200th Coast Artillery (AA) Regiment
- Military History of the Philippines
- Military History of the United States
