= Fort Frank =

WW2-era fort in the Philippines

Coordinates: 14°16′00″N 120°36′52″E

- Carabao Island, Philippines
- Part of Harbor Defenses of Manila and Subic Bays
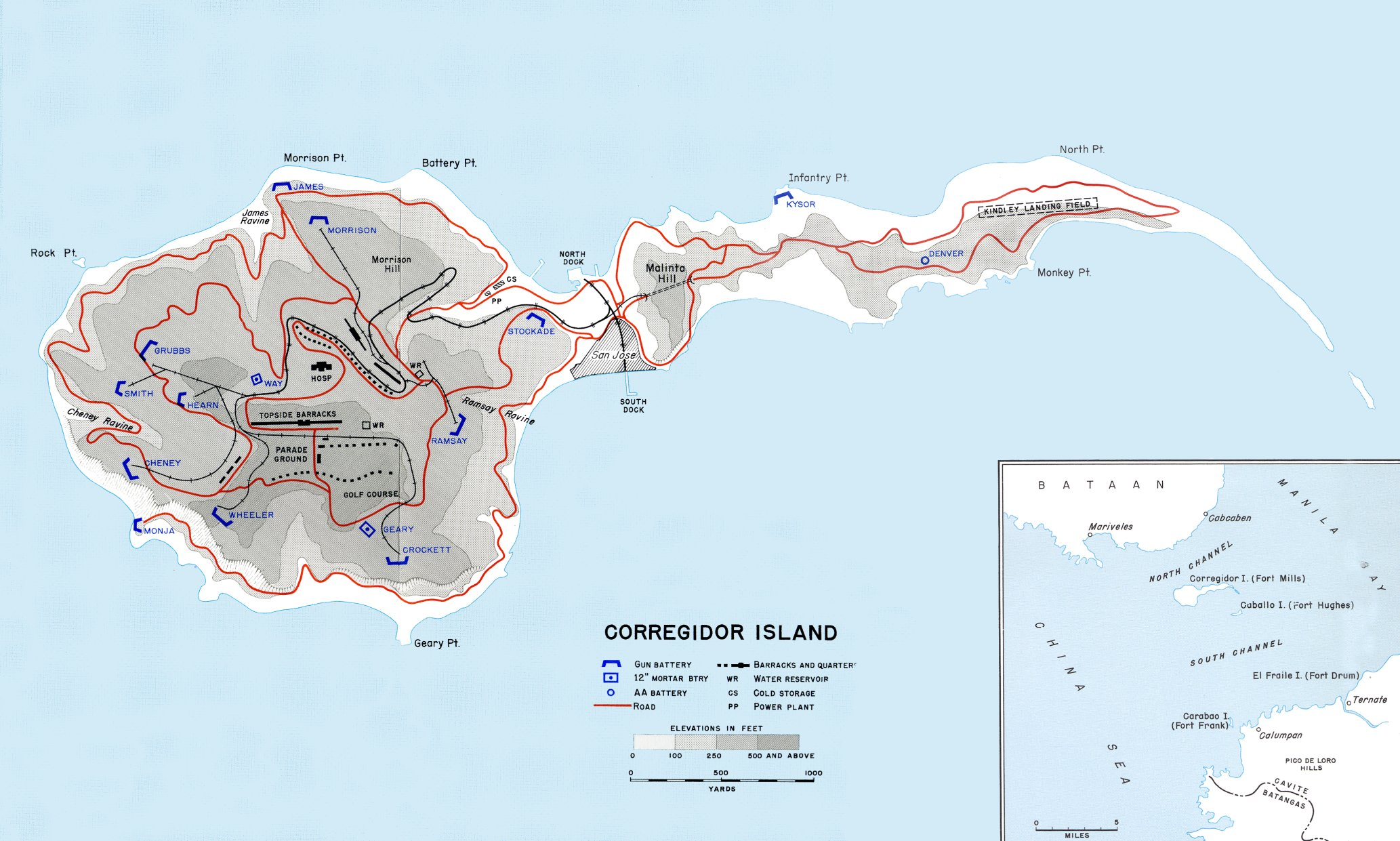
- Manila Bay forts in WWII (inset)

Site information
- Controlled by: United States

Site history
- Built: completed 1913
- Built by: United States Army Corps of Engineers
- Battles/wars: Philippines campaign (1941–1942)

Garrison information
- Garrison: 91st Coast Artillery; 92nd Coast Artillery; 60th Coast Artillery (AA)

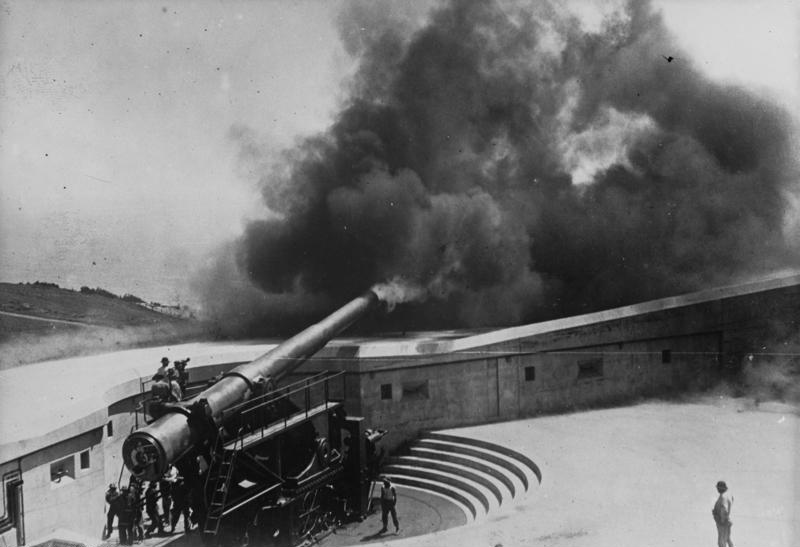
14-inch (356 mm) M1910 gun fires at Fort MacArthur, San Pedro, California.

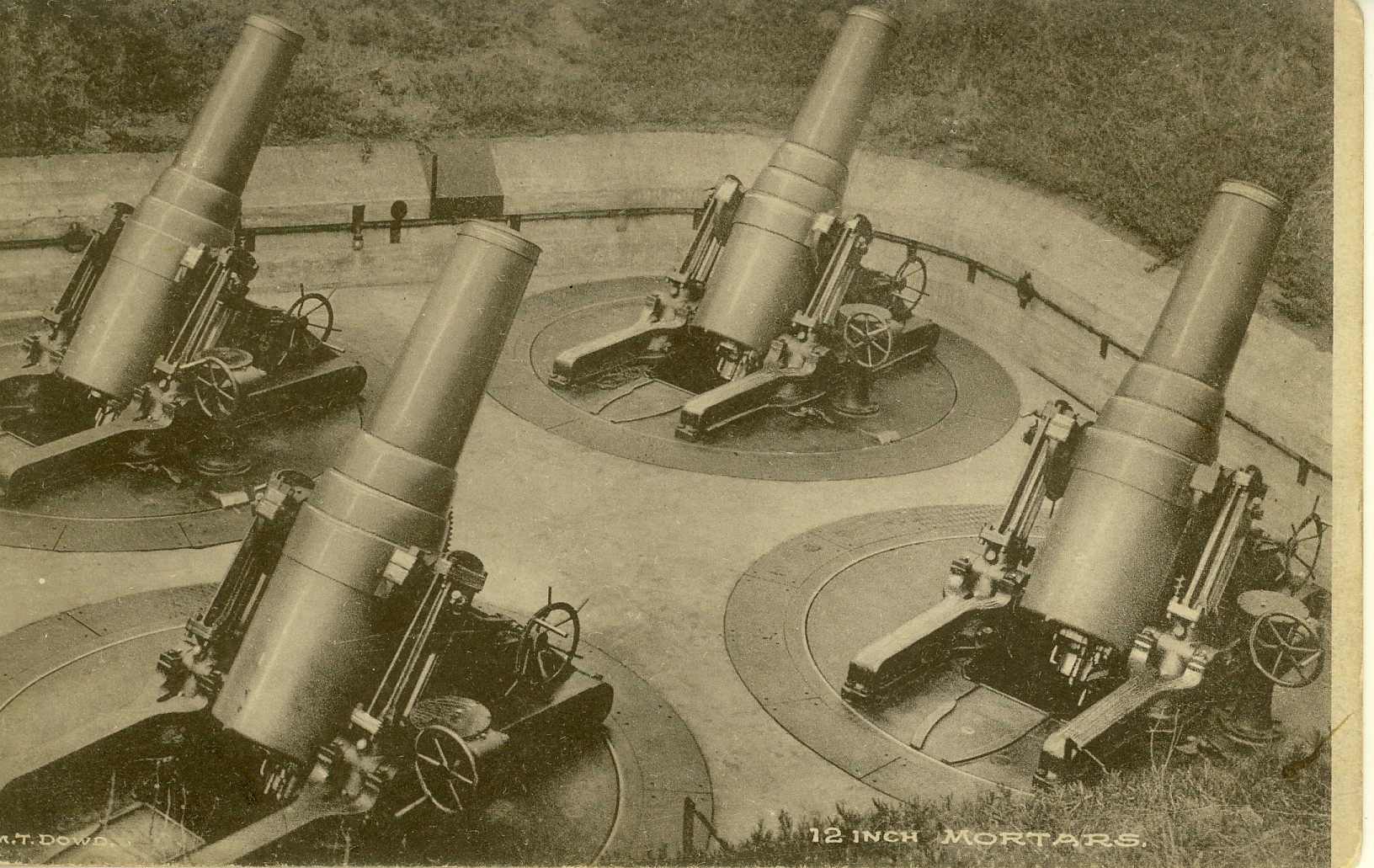
12-inch (305 mm) mortars, similar to those of Battery Koehler.

Fort Frank (Carabao Island, the Philippines) was one of the defense forts at the entrance to Manila Bay established by the United States. The entire island was designated as Fort Frank, in honor of Brigadier General Royal T. Frank, as part of the Harbor Defenses of Manila and Subic Bays built by the Philippine Department of the US Army in the early 1900s.

== Geography ==
Carabao Island is located near the southern end of the entrance to Manila Bay about 0.5 miles (0.80 km) off the coast of Maragondon in the province of Cavite. The long, narrow island is surrounded by sheer cliffs over 100 feet (30 m). The whole island and fort has an area of 44.5 acres (18.0 ha) with the highest elevation at 185 feet (56 m).

== History ==
=== Construction ===
The establishment of the islands of Manila Bay as military reservations was requested by the US Army and enacted by Executive Order of President Theodore Roosevelt on 11 April 1902.

All but two of the fort's batteries were completed in 1913. These included Batteries Greer and Crofton, each with one 14-inch (356 mm) gun M1910 on a disappearing carriage. Battery Koehler had eight 12-inch (305 mm) mortars, and Battery Hoyle had two 3-inch (76 mm) seacoast guns on pedestal mounts. Circa 1940 Battery Hoyle was disarmed (one gun went to defend the "stern" of Fort Drum), and Battery Frank (or Frank North) was added, with four Panama mounts for 155 mm (6.1 in) mobile guns. In 1941 the antiaircraft Battery Ermita was added, with four 3-inch (76 mm) AA guns on mobile mounts. Three 75 mm (2.95 in) field guns (possibly the 75 mm (2.95 in) gun M1917 also used by a Philippine Scouts regiment) for beach defense were also on the island.

Battery Greer was named for Col. John E. Greer, an Ordnance Corps officer. Battery Crofton was named for Captain William Crofton, an infantry officer. Battery Koehler was named for 1st Lt. Edgar F. Koehler, killed in the Philippine–American War. Battery Hoyle was named for Brigadier General Eli D. Hoyle, a Spanish–American War veteran who was an administrator in World War I.

Battery Ermita was probably named for the district in Manila. Battery Frank North was possibly named for Major Frank North, commander of the Pawnee Scouts.

=== World War II ===
Aerial photograph from April 12, 1945 taken during the American operation to retake the island

The fort's design included little protection against air and high-angle artillery attack except camouflage. Also, most of its heavy ammunition was armor-piercing, intended for use against battleships, rather than the high explosive type that would be more useful against enemy troops and artillery.

Fort Frank was heavily engaged in the Japanese invasion of the Philippines. On 31 January 1942 the fort's mortar battery bombarded mainland positions in the Pico de Loro Hills that the Japanese were emplacing artillery in. The 75 mm guns were also able to engage mainland targets. The Japanese began bombarding Fort Drum and Fort Frank on 6 February 1942. Fort Frank was vulnerable in another way: its normal water supply was from a dam's reservoir on the Japanese-held mainland. On 16 February the Japanese discovered this and removed part of the pipeline near the dam. Although the fort also had a distillation plant to provide fresh water, this consumed fuel that was also needed for the gun batteries' generators that powered the ammunition hoists. The fort's commander ordered the distillation plant started, but also directed a 15-man team to attempt to restore the pipeline on the 19th. They successfully engaged a Japanese patrol but could not get to the pipeline. Eventually another party repaired the pipeline on 9 March. On 20 March 1942, thirty-four soldiers were killed by Japanese artillery when a round ricocheted into a tunnel at Battery Crofton.

Fort Frank was surrendered, along with all other US forces in the Philippines, on 6 May 1942, after destruction procedures were executed on its guns to prevent their use by the enemy.

During their occupation the Japanese were reportedly able to repair the 14 in (356 mm) gun of Battery Crofton and add three 100 mm (3.94 in) guns. In April 1945, during the American liberation of the Philippines, Fort Frank was heavily bombarded with 1,000 lb (450 kg) bombs and napalm (among other ordnance) in preparation for recapture. On 16 April 1945 the 1st Battalion, 151st Infantry Regiment and Co. C, 113th Engineer Battalion landed on Fort Frank to find that the Japanese had successfully evacuated the island.

== See also ==
- Harbor Defenses of Manila and Subic Bays
- Military History of the Philippines
- Military History of the United States
- List of islands in the Greater Manila Area
- List of islands of the Philippines
- Manila Bay
- Seacoast defense in the United States
- United States Army Coast Artillery Corps
