= Fort Wint =

WW2-era fort in the Philippines

- Part of Harbor Defenses of Manila and Subic Bays
- Grande Island, Olongapo City, Philippines
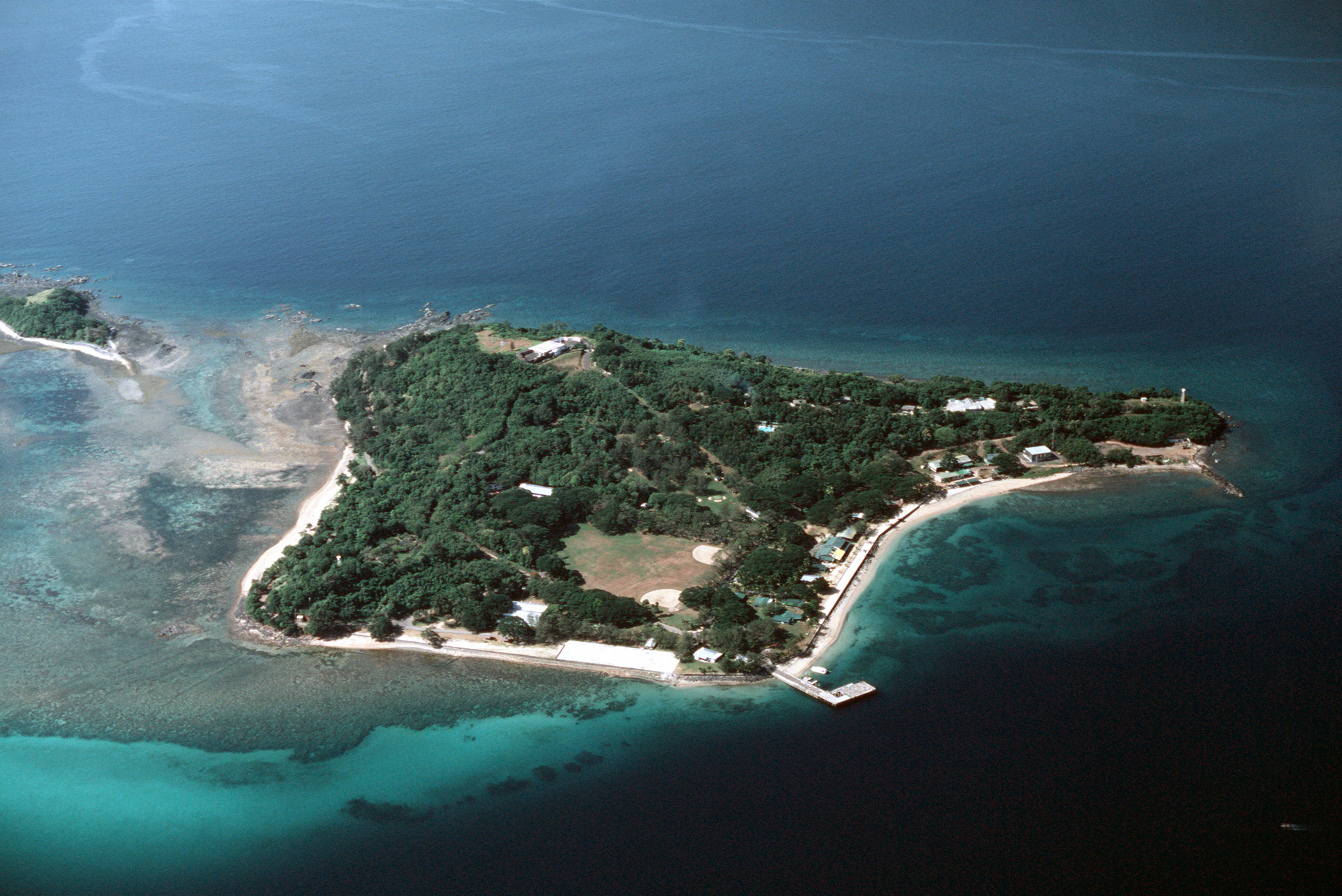
- Fort Wint

Site information
- Controlled by: United States

Location
- Coordinates: 14°46′10.77″N 120°13′40.30″E

Site history
- Built: completed 1910
- Battles/wars: Philippines campaign (1941–1942); Philippines Campaign (1944–1945)

Garrison information
- Garrison: 91st Coast Artillery (Philippine Scouts); 92nd Coast Artillery (PS); 60th Coast Artillery (AA); 2nd Coast Artillery (Philippine Army)

Fort Wint was part of the harbor defenses of Manila and Subic Bays built by the Philippine Department of the United States Army between 1907 and 1920 in response to recommendations of the Taft Board prior to the non-fortification clause of the Washington Naval Treaty. Fort Wint was located on Grande Island at the entrance of Subic Bay, approximately 35 miles (56 km) north of Manila Bay. The fort was named for Brigadier General Theodore J. Wint. As specified in the National Defense Act of 1935, this was one of the locations where coastal artillery training was conducted. A battery of the 60th Coast Artillery (AA) was stationed here.

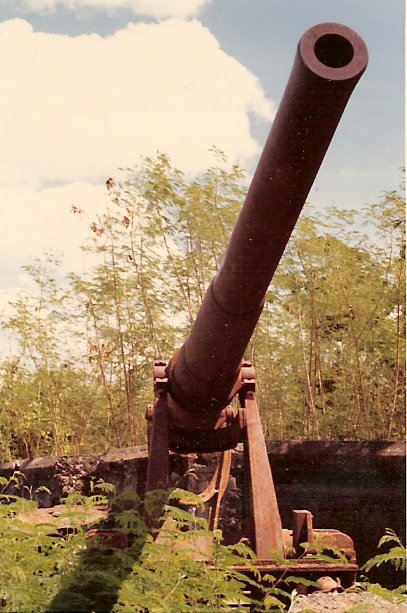
Splinter-damaged 6-inch (15-cm) United States M1905 disappearing gun at Battery Hall, Fort Wint.

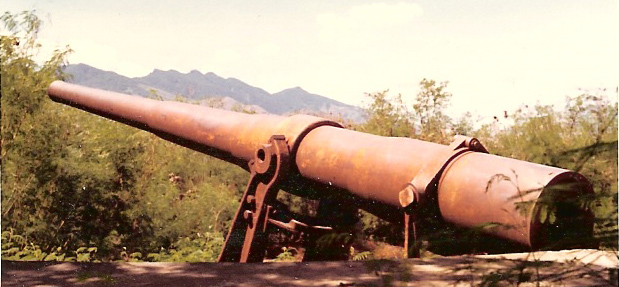
Buffington-Crozier carriage of the gun shown above.

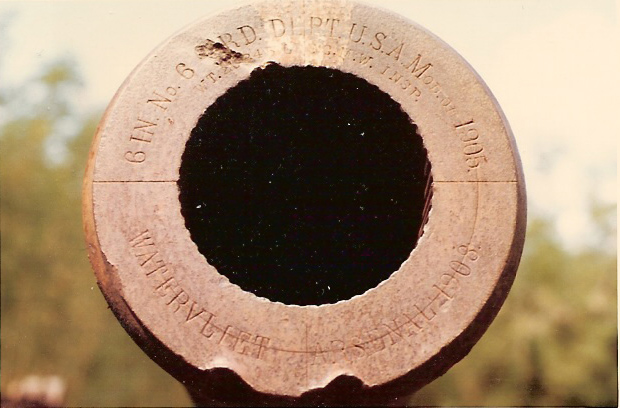
Identification engraving on the muzzle of the gun shown above.

== Armament ==
Fort Wint was armed with fourteen Taft-Endicott period coast artillery pieces mounted in five batteries. Battery Warwick contained the fort's most powerful weaponry, two 10-inch (254 mm) M1895 disappearing guns on Buffington-Crozier carriages. Batteries Hall and Woodruff each mounted two 6-inch (152 mm) M1905 guns, also on disappearing carriages. Batteries Flake and Jewell were armed with 3-inch (76 mm) M1903 guns on pedestal mounts. As with other forts of the same period, the weaponry of Fort Wint was obsolete at the outbreak of hostilities with Japan in 1941.

== World War II ==
In July 1941 minefields were laid at the entrance to Subic Bay. These included an Army controlled minefield operated from Fort Wint as well as naval mines, with the controlled Army mines in the ship channel, and naval mines to the sides of the channel. In December 1941 the bay entrance was ordered completely closed by Navy mines.

In the first week of January 1942, as Allied forces withdrew to the Bataan peninsula, Fort Wint was ordered abandoned and its crews reassigned to other American positions in Manila Bay. This was reportedly due to a mistake by the commander of the Northern Luzon Force. Consequently, the fort played no part in the subsequent siege of the island forts. Fort Wint was recaptured by U.S. forces in March 1945. The fort suffered substantial damage during the campaign to retake the Philippines .

== Post-war ==
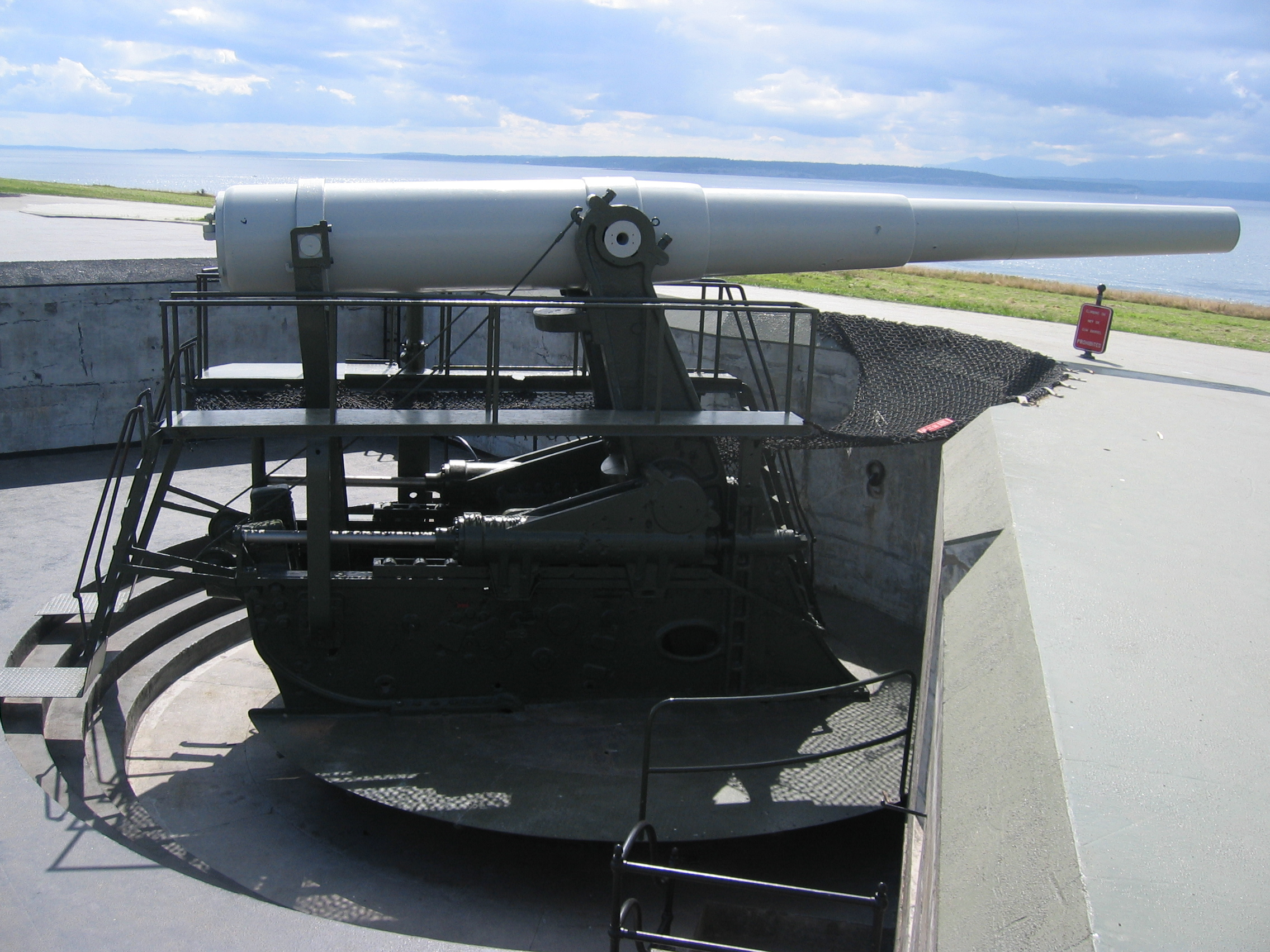
10-inch gun from Fort Wint, now at Fort Casey, Washington

Grande Island and the remains of Fort Wint were incorporated into the U.S. Naval Base Subic Bay. The two 10-inch (254 mm) disappearing guns of Battery Warwick were dismantled by the United States Navy in the 1960s and shipped to Fort Casey in Washington state for renovation and display. The four 3-inch (76 mm) guns of Batteries Flake and Jewell were removed and divided between Forts Flagler and Casey in Washington state where they remain on display. The 6-inch (152 mm) guns of Battery Hall remain in place (pictures right). Grand Island was operated for many decades after WW II by Subic Bay US Navy Special Services as an on base resort for US Military and Civilians stationed throughout the Philippines. It was accessible via a small landing craft type boat shuttle service at the pier adjacent to the Alava Carrier Pier in front of the HQ building at Naval Station Subic Bay.

During Operation New Life in 1975, thousands of South Vietnamese refugees were sheltered and processed on Grande Island after the fall of South Vietnam to North Vietnam on April 30. After the six-month rescue mission, Grande Island was rehabilitated and was restored to its Special Services resort configuration until 1991. At that time, the lease on US military bases expired, and the US bases were closed about the same time they were damaged by the eruption of Mount Pinatubo. Grande Island was restored as a resort after repairs following damage from the Mount Pinatubo eruption. It was restored by the civilian Philippine Subic Bay Free Port Zone Authority following the closure of the Subic Naval Base in 1992.

== See also ==
- U.S. Naval Base Subic Bay
- Geography of the Philippines
- List of islands of the Philippines
- Military History of the Philippines
- Military History of the United States
- Seacoast defense in the United States
- United States Army Coast Artillery Corps
