= 243rd Coast Artillery (United States) =

243rd Coast Artillery Regiment
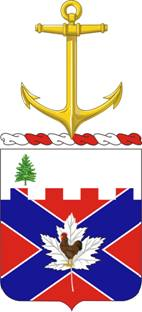
- Coat of arms
- Active: 1924 – 1944
- Country: United States
- Branch: Army
- Type: Coast artillery
- Role: Harbor defense
- Size: Regiment
- Part of: Harbor Defenses of Narragansett Bay
- Garrison/HQ: Fort Adams
- Motto: Game to the last
- Mascot: Oozlefinch

The 243rd Coast Artillery Regiment was a Coast Artillery Corps regiment in the Rhode Island National Guard. It garrisoned the Harbor Defenses of Narragansett Bay (HD Narragansett Bay), Rhode Island 1924–1944.

== History ==
The 243rd Coast Artillery was organized 29 May 1924 as the Rhode Island National Guard component of the Harbor Defenses of Narragansett Bay (HD Narragansett Bay), Rhode Island. The 10th Coast Artillery was the Regular Army component of those defenses. The 243rd's primary armory was the Cranston Street Armory in Providence, Rhode Island. In October 1944 the regiment was broken up into two battalions as part of an Army-wide reorganization.

== Lineage ==
Organized 11 July 1924 by redesignating the 243rd Artillery, Coast Artillery Corps, Rhode Island National Guard. The regiment's commander in 1928 was Colonel Cyril L. D. Wells.

On 16 September 1940, with World War II under way in Europe, the regiment was inducted into federal service in Providence, Rhode Island, with a public ceremony and a parade through the city. The regiment's commander in 1940 was Colonel Earl C. Webster. The regiment moved to Fort Adams in Newport on 22 September 1940, and deployed to forts in HD Narragansett Bay in the following months.

On 14 March 1941 the regimental headquarters relocated to Fort Getty in Jamestown.

In 1942 Battery Gray with two 16-inch (406 mm) guns was built at Fort Church in Little Compton, and in 1943 the similar Battery Hamilton was built at Fort Greene in Point Judith. These guns superseded all previous heavy artillery in Narragansett Bay, which was soon scrapped. New 6-inch (152 mm) gun batteries at Fort Greene, Fort Church, and Fort Burnside largely superseded the smaller weapons.

In June 1943 Battery D transferred to the 8th Coast Artillery in HD Portland, Maine as Battery I, 8th CA.

By 31 December 1943 the 243rd garrisoned the West Passage forts, primarily Fort Greene along with 6-inch guns at Fort Varnum and Fort Burnside, while the 10th CA garrisoned Fort Church on the Sakonnet River. The 243rd operated four Anti-Motor Torpedo Boat (AMTB) batteries of 90 mm guns at Fort Varnum and the older forts, while the 10th operated an AMTB battery at Brenton Point. The 10th CA operated both minefields, in the West Passage and East Passage.

On 22 February 1944 the 243rd's batteries were redeployed to garrison all 6-inch and AMTB batteries in HD Narragansett Bay, and the 3rd Battalion was demobilized. In March 1944 the 10th CA was withdrawn for inactivation, with assets transferred to HD Narragansett Bay.

On 7 October 1944 the regiment was broken up into the 188th and 189th Coast Artillery Battalions (both at Fort Adams), which were deactivated with remaining components transferred to HD Narragansett Bay on 1 April 1945.

The regiment's lineage traces back to the 1st Regiment Rhode Island Militia of the Revolutionary War. Subsequent units served in the Civil War and the Spanish–American War. Circa 1907 the Coast Artillery Corps (CAC), Rhode Island National Guard (RING) was organized. Some of Rhode Island's coast artillery companies served as elements of several heavy artillery regiments in France in World War I, including the 52nd Artillery (Coast Artillery Corps). On 14 June 1920 the RI NG coast artillery was reorganized as the 1st Coast Defense Command, RING. On 14 September 1923 this command was redesignated as the 243rd Artillery, CAC, and on 11 July 1924 became the 243rd Coast Artillery Regiment. As of 2018 the 243rd's lineage is carried by the 243rd Regiment (Regional Training Institute), Rhode Island Army National Guard, at Camp Varnum in Narragansett, Rhode Island.

== Distinctive unit insignia ==
- Shield

Gules, over all and on a saltire azure fimbriated argent a maple leaf of the last charged with a Rhode Island Red rooster proper; in dexter on a chief embattled of the third a pine tree vert.

- Motto

Game to the last.

== Coat of arms ==
- Shield
  - Gules, over all and on a saltire azure fimbriated argent a maple leaf of the last charged with a Rhode Island Red rooster proper; in dexter on a chief embattled of the third a pine tree vert.
- Crest
  - That for regiments of the Rhode Island National Guard: On a wreath of the colors (argent and gules) an anchor paleways or.
  - The anchor, the device of Rhode Island, is the symbol of stability.
- Motto
  - Game to the last.

== See also ==
- Seacoast defense in the United States
- United States Army Coast Artillery Corps
- Harbor Defense Command
