= Harbor Defense Command =

Type of U. S. military organization

A Harbor Defense Command was a military organization of the United States Army Coast Artillery Corps designated in 1925 from predecessor organizations dating from circa 1895. It consisted of the forts, controlled underwater minefields, and other coastal defenses of a particular harbor or river. Harbor Defense Commands, along with the similar Coast Artillery Corps, were disestablished in 1950.

== History ==
These commands originated as Artillery Districts, to control groups of forts constructed under the Endicott Program beginning in 1895. A 1909 reference shows that districts could include (depending on size) a Battle Command (later Fort Command), Fire Command, Mine Command, and Battery Commands. Mine planter vessels were also attached to these commands to plant and maintain controlled minefields. In 1913 the districts were redesignated as Coast Defense Commands, called "Coast Defenses of..." the area protected. At this time Coast Artillery Districts became regional commands, each controlling several Coast Defense Commands. Several of these commands were disarmed and disestablished between World War I and World War II, although minefield defenses may have been retained (references are unclear). Some of the disarmed commands were rearmed in World War II with "Panama mounts", circular concrete platforms for towed 155 mm guns. Some of these rearmed commands and other hastily armed areas were designated as "Temporary Harbor Defenses". In 1925 the Coast Defense Commands were redesignated as Harbor Defense Commands, called "Harbor Defenses of..." the area protected. After World War II all of these commands were disarmed within a few years, and they and the Coast Artillery Corps were disestablished in 1950.

== Harbor Defense Command areas ==
The major Harbor Defense Commands in the Continental United States (CONUS) were:

Name	State(s)	Forts	Years active in coast defense	Notes
The Kennebec	Maine	Fort Baldwin, Fort Popham	1899-1924	Probably merged with Coast Defenses of Portland prior to 1917 (not listed in Rinaldi WWI), rearmed with Panama mounts in World War II
Portland	Maine	Fort McKinley, Fort Lyon, Fort Levett, Fort Preble, Fort Williams, Peaks Island Military Reservation	1898–1948	
Portsmouth	New Hampshire, Maine	Fort Foster, Fort Constitution, Fort Stark, Fort Dearborn	1898–1948	
Boston	Massachusetts	Fort Ruckman, Fort Banks, Fort Heath, Fort Dawes, Fort Warren, Fort Standish, Fort Strong, Fort Andrews, Fort Duvall, Fort Revere, East Point Military Reservation	1896-1948	
New Bedford	Massachusetts	Fort Rodman	1899-1946	
Narragansett Bay	Rhode Island	Fort Adams, Fort Church, Fort Wetherill, Fort Getty, Fort Burnside, Fort Greble, Fort Kearny, Fort Varnum, Fort Greene	1898–1947	
Long Island Sound	New York, Rhode Island	Fort Mansfield, Fort H. G. Wright, Fort Michie, Fort Terry, Fort Tyler, Camp Hero	1900-1948	
Eastern New York	New York	Fort Slocum, Fort Schuyler, Fort Totten	1897-1935	Anti-aircraft training center in World War II
Southern New York	New York, New Jersey	Fort Tilden, Fort Hamilton, Fort Wadsworth, Fort Hancock, Sandy Hook Proving Ground, Highlands Military Reservation	1890-1948	Also separate Harbor Defenses of Sandy Hook since at least World War I, merged in World War II as Harbor Defenses of New York
Sandy Hook	New Jersey	Fort Hancock, Sandy Hook Proving Ground, Highlands Military Reservation	1915?-1942	Probably split from HD Southern New York 1915, merged with HD Southern New York in World War II as Harbor Defenses of New York
The Delaware	Delaware, New Jersey, Philadelphia	Fort Mott, Fort Delaware, Fort DuPont, Fort Saulsbury, Fort Miles, Cape May Military Reservation	1899-1948	
Baltimore	Maryland	Fort Howard, Fort Carroll, Fort Armistead, Fort Smallwood	1899-1927	
The Potomac	Maryland, Virginia	Fort Washington, Fort Hunt	1898–1929	
Chesapeake Bay	Virginia	Fort Monroe, Fort Wool, Fort John Custis, Fort Story	1897-1948	
Beaufort	North Carolina	Fort Macon	1941-1945	Temporary in World War II with 155 mm GPF guns
The Cape Fear	North Carolina	Fort Caswell	1899-1925	
Wilmington	North Carolina	Kure Beach Military Reservation	1940-1945	Temporary in World War II with Panama mounts
Charleston	South Carolina	Fort Moultrie, Fort Sumter	1898–1947	
Port Royal Sound	South Carolina	Fort Fremont	1897-1914	
Savannah	Georgia	Fort Screven, Fort Pulaski	1898–1928	rearmed with Panama mounts in World War II
Key West	Florida	Fort Taylor	1900-1946	
Tampa Bay	Florida	Fort Dade, Fort DeSoto	1899-1926	rearmed with Panama mounts in World War II
Pensacola	Florida	Fort Pickens, Fort McRee	1898–1947	
Mobile	Alabama	Fort Morgan, Fort Gaines	1898–1928	rearmed with Panama mounts in World War II
The Mississippi	Louisiana	Fort St. Philip, Fort Jackson	1898–1920	rearmed with Panama mounts in World War II as Temporary Harbor Defenses of New Orleans
Galveston	Texas	Fort Travis, Fort San Jacinto, Fort Crockett	1898–1946	
San Diego	California	Fort Rosecrans, Fort Emory	1900-1946	
Los Angeles	California	Fort MacArthur, White Point Military Reservation, Bolsa Chica Military Reservation	1917-1948	
San Francisco	California	Fort Funston, Fort Miley, Presidio of San Francisco, Fort Winfield Scott, Fort McDowell, Fort Baker, Fort Barry, Fort Cronkhite	1894-1948	
The Columbia	Oregon, Washington	Fort Stevens, Fort Columbia, Fort Canby	1898–1947	
Puget Sound	Washington	Fort Ward, Fort Whitman, Fort Flagler, Fort Casey, Fort Worden, Fort Ebey	1899-1943	
Cape Flattery	Washington	Camp Hayden, Cape Flattery Military Reservation	1942-1948	

The major Harbor Defense Commands in US territories were:

Name	Territory	Forts	Years active in coast defense	Notes
Honolulu	Hawaii	Fort Ruger, Fort DeRussy, Fort Armstrong	1910-1946	Coast Defenses of Oahu divided into Honolulu and Pearl Harbor in March 1921
Pearl Harbor	Hawaii	Fort Barrette, Fort Weaver, Fort Kamehameha	1914-1948	Coast Defenses of Oahu divided into Honolulu and Pearl Harbor in March 1921
Kaneohe Bay and the North Shore	Hawaii	Fort Hase	1940-1946	
Manila and Subic Bays	Philippines	Fort Mills, Fort Drum, Fort Frank, Fort Hughes, Fort Wint	1910-1942	
Cristobal	Panama Canal Zone	Fort Randolph, Fort De Lesseps, Fort Sherman	1912-1948	Atlantic side
Balboa	Panama Canal Zone	Fort Kobbe, Fort Amador, Fort Grant	1912-1948	Pacific side
Sitka	Alaska	Fort Babcock, Fort Peirce, Fort Rousseau	1944-1950	
Seward	Alaska	Fort McGilvray, Fort Bulkley	1941-1945	Only Panama mounts completed
Kodiak	Alaska	Fort J.H. Smith, Fort Tidball, Fort Abercrombie	1944-1950	
Dutch Harbor	Alaska	Fort Learnard, Fort Schwatka	1944-1950	
Vieques Sound	Puerto Rico/Virgin Islands	Fort Segarra, Fort Charles W. Bundy	1944-1948	Protected the approaches to Roosevelt Roads Naval Station
San Juan	Puerto Rico	Fort Amezquita, Fort Mascaro, Fort Brooke	1941-1948	

The Harbor Defense Commands established as a result of the 1940 Destroyers for Bases Agreement with the United Kingdom were:

Name	Territory	Forts	Years active in coast defense	Notes
Argentia and St. John's	Newfoundland	Fort McAndrew, Fort Pepperrell	1941–1946	Total of 25 battery sites across the country
Bermuda	Bermuda	Fort Victoria, Scaur Hill Fort, Tudor Hill	1941–1946	
Trinidad	Trinidad	Fort Read, Chacachacare Island	1941–1946	Only Panama mounts completed

== See also ==
- Seacoast defense in the United States
- List of coastal fortifications of the United States
- List of forts in the United States
