= Fort Kearny (Rhode Island) =

- Part of Harbor Defenses of Narragansett Bay
- Saunderstown, Narragansett, Rhode Island
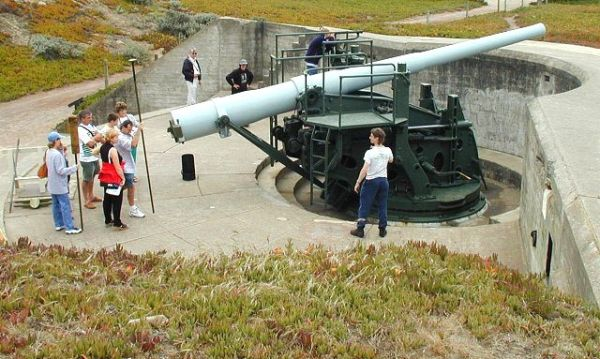
- 6-inch gun M1903 on disappearing carriage M1905 at Battery Chamberlin in San Francisco, similar to the guns at Fort Kearny.

Site information
- Type: Coastal Defense, later POW camp
- Owner: University of Rhode Island
- Controlled by: University of Rhode Island
- Condition: partly re-used, partly built on

Location
- Location in Rhode Island
- Coordinates: 41°29′26″N 71°25′22″W

Site history
- Built: 1908
- Built by: United States Army
- In use: 1908-1946
- Battles/wars: World War II

Fort Kearny was a coastal defense fort in the Saunderstown area of Narragansett, Rhode Island from 1901 to 1943. It was a prisoner-of-war camp for German prisoners in 1945. It is now the Narragansett Bay Campus of the University of Rhode Island. In many sources it is spelled Fort Kearney.

== History ==
Fort Kearny was built under the Endicott Program 1904-1908 as part of the Coast Defenses of Narragansett Bay. The fort is named for Major General Philip Kearny, killed in the American Civil War. It protected the West Passage of Narragansett Bay, along with Fort Getty in Jamestown and Fort Greble on Dutch Island. The fort was primarily armed with six 6-inch M1905 guns (152 mm) on disappearing carriages, four in Battery French and two in Battery Cram. Two 3-inch M1903 guns (76 mm) were also present in Battery Armistead. Battery French was named for William H. French, a general in the Civil War. Battery Cram was named for Thomas J. Cram, a topographical engineer in the Civil War. Battery Armistead was named for Captain Lewis G. A. Armistead, who was killed in the War of 1812.

The guns of Battery French were removed in 1917 for potential service on the Western Front; three of the guns were sent to France for use on field carriages, but sources indicate that none of the 6-inch gun regiments completed training before the Armistice and thus they did not see combat. The guns were not returned to Fort Kearny.

In World War II a large-scale modernization of coast defenses was implemented; in Narragansett Bay this was centered on Fort Church and Fort Greene. Fort Kearny was slated for disarmament once the new defenses were completed. In 1942 the 3-inch guns of Battery Armistead were relocated to Fort Varnum, and in 1943, with improved defenses completed, Fort Kearny's two remaining guns at Battery Cram were scrapped.

Fort Kearny was a prisoner-of-war camp in World War II, beginning in February 1945. It was the headquarters of a program to re-educate German prisoners with democratic values, one element of which was the German-language newspaper Der Ruf (The Call).

== Present ==
Fort Kearny is now the Narragansett Bay Campus of the University of Rhode Island. A small nuclear research reactor has been built on top of Battery French. Battery Cram and Battery Armistead have been refurbished as office space.

== See also ==
- Seacoast defense in the United States
- United States Army Coast Artillery Corps
