= 10th Coast Artillery (United States) =

10th Coast Artillery Regiment
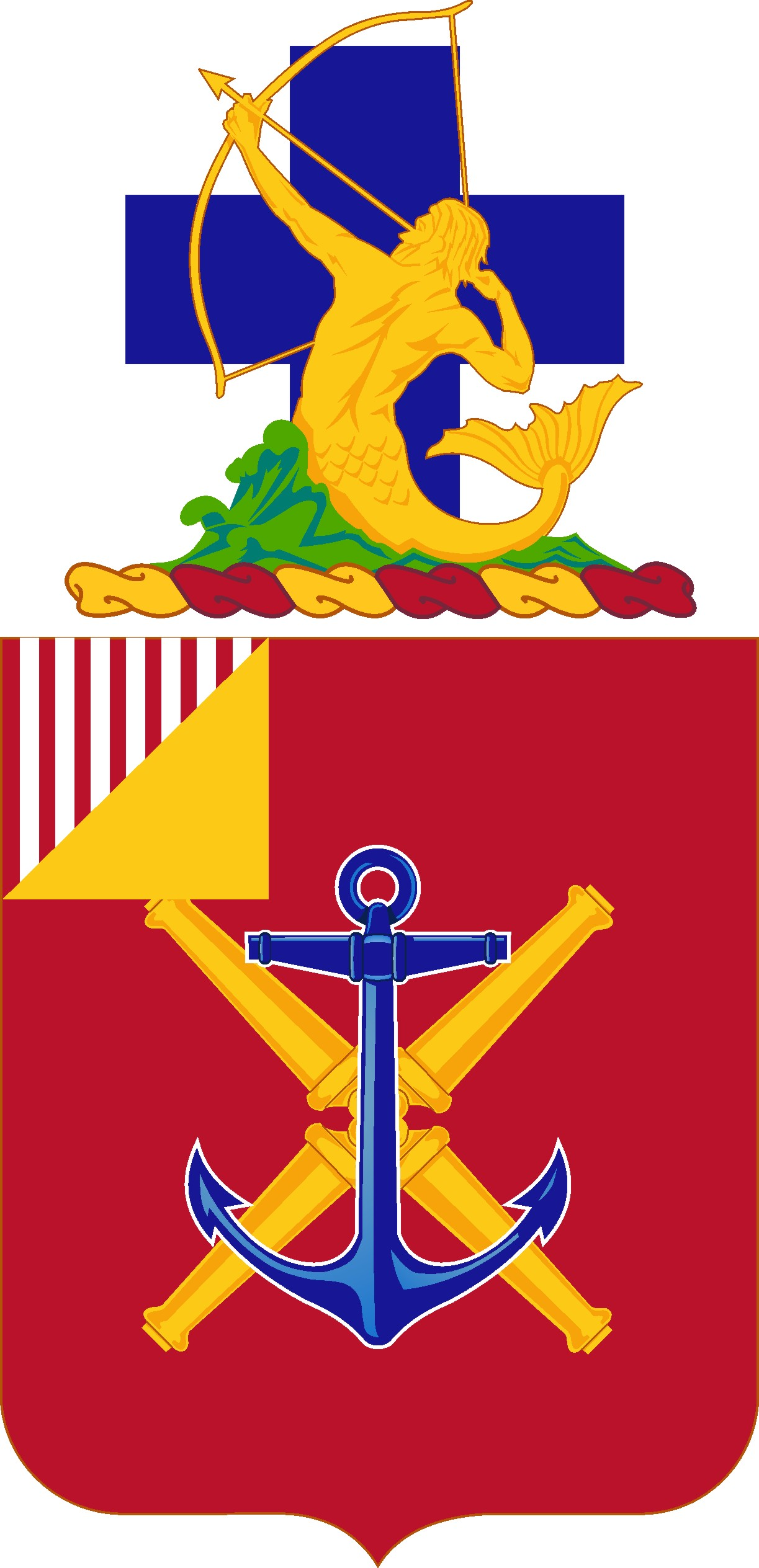
- Coat of arms
- Active: 1924 - 1944
- Country: United States
- Branch: Army
- Type: Coast artillery
- Role: Harbor defense
- Size: Regiment
- Part of: Harbor Defenses of Narragansett Bay
- Garrison/HQ: Fort Adams
- Motto: "Vaillant et Veillant"
- Mascot: Oozlefinch
- Engagements: War of 1812; Civil War; World War II

The 10th Coast Artillery Regiment was a Coast Artillery regiment in the United States Army. It primarily served as the Regular Army coast artillery component of the Harbor Defenses (HD) of Narragansett Bay, Rhode Island from 1924 through 1944, when it was relieved and disbanded as part of an Army-wide reorganization.

== Lineage ==
Constituted in the Regular Army on 27 February 1924 as 10th Coast Artillery (Harbor Defense), and organized on 1 July 1924 at Fort Adams by redesignating the following companies of the Coast Artillery Corps (CAC): 173rd, 52nd, 97th, 102nd, 110th, 129th, 147th, and 174th. (and 7th CA Band). Only Headquarters and Headquarters Battery (HHB) activated; provided caretaker detachments for HD Narragansett Bay and HD New Bedford. The 243rd Coast Artillery was the Rhode Island National Guard component of HD Narragansett Bay.

- 1st, 2nd, and 3rd Battalion and HHB constituted inactive components on 31 January 1935.
- Batteries A and B were activated at Fort Wetherill on 1 July 1939 and 1 September 1940.
- HHB provided a caretaker detachment at Fort Rodman, HD New Bedford, Massachusetts until the activation of the 23rd Coast Artillery Battalion on 1 February 1940.
- Batteries C, D, E, and F were activated on 10 February 1941 at Fort Adams. Battery C was assigned to Fort Greene. Batteries D, E, and F were assigned to Fort Church, RI.
- 1st and 2nd Battalions and HHB activated on 25 April 1941.
- Battery G was activated on 6 January 1941 at Fort Adams, as a searchlight (SL) battery.
- Battery E transferred to HD Portland (less personnel and equipment) and redesignated Battery L, 8th Coast Artillery on 26 July 1943.
- The 10th CA manned defenses in the eastern part of HD Narragansett Bay and all mine defenses in the bay.
- Regimental assets were transferred to HD Narragansett Bay and HHB 10th Coast Artillery was reassigned to Camp Forrest, TN 14 March 1944; inactivated on 10 April 1944.
- Disbanded 31 May 1944.

Unit lineage resumed as follows:

- HHB reconstituted in the Regular Army on 28 June 1950 as HHB, 10th Antiaircraft Artillery Group.
- HHB redesignated as HHB, 10th Artillery Group 20 March 1958 (see 10th Army Air & Missile Defense Command for further lineage).

== Distinctive unit insignia ==
- Description

A Gold color and metal enamel device 1 inch (2.54 cm) in height overall blazoned: On a wreath Or and Gules, a triton torque drawing a bow and arrow aimed bendwise Or, above a sea wave Vert (Transparent Sea Green) in front of a Latin cross couped Azure.

- Symbolism

The blue cross indicates the Civil War service of Battery E, 5th Artillery (now Battery E, 10th Coast Artillery). It served in the 3rd Division, 6th Army Corps during this conflict. The triton with bow and arrow symbolizes danger rising from the sea, against which the Coast Artillery in its forts must guard.

- Background

The distinctive unit insignia was originally approved for the 10th Coast Artillery Regiment on 27 February 1926. It was redesignated for the 10th Antiaircraft Artillery Automatic Weapons Battalion on 13 June 1952.

(note- according to Sawicki the Automatic Weapons Battalion was converted to a Missile Battalion on 5 December 1956 (Nike), and inactivated on 1 September 1958 at Fairchild Air Force Base, Spokane, Washington.)

== Coat of arms ==
=== Blazon ===
- Shield

Gules, four cannons saltirewise base to base Or above an anchor paleways Azure fimbriated Argent; augmented of a canton per bend sinister, paly of fifteen of the field and the fourth, base of the second.

- Crest

On a wreath Or and Gules, a triton torque drawing a bow and arrow aimed bendwise Or, above a sea wave Vert (Transparent Sea Green) in front of a Latin cross couped Azure. Motto VAILLANT ET VEILLANT (Valiant and Vigilant).

=== Symbolism ===
- Shield

The red of the shield signifies Artillery; the blue anchor is taken from the coat of arms of the old Coast Defenses of Narragansett Bay; the four cannons form the Roman numeral ten. Battery D, 10th Coast Artillery claims parentage from Battery C, 2nd Coast Artillery (formerly 14th Company, Coast Artillery Corps and Battery C, 2nd Artillery). As the 14th Company, CAC, this company was in the Coast Defenses of Narragansett Bay from 1907 through 1924. The latter has no coat of arms but the addition of a canton is made to indicate this parentage, but divided since one battery can claim this parentage. Battery C, 2nd Coast Artillery was part of the garrison of Fort McHenry and commanded by Captain Frederic Evans during its bombardment, on 13 September 1814, and this event is taken from the coat of arms of the 2nd Coast Artillery and depicted in the fifteen stripes in the canton.

- Crest

The blue cross indicates the Civil War service of Battery E, 5th Artillery (now Battery E, 10th Coast Artillery). It served in the 3rd Division, 6th Army Corps during this conflict. The triton with bow and arrow symbolizes danger rising from the sea, against which the Coast Artillery in its forts must guard.

=== Background ===
The coat of arms was originally approved for the 10th Coast Artillery on 27 February 1926. It was redesignated for the 10th Antiaircraft Artillery Automatic Weapons Battalion on 13 June 1952.

== Campaign streamers ==
none

== Decorations ==
none

== See also ==
- Distinctive unit insignia (U.S. Army)
- Seacoast defense in the United States
- United States Army Coast Artillery Corps
- Harbor Defense Command
