= Harbor Defenses of Narragansett Bay =

Coordinates: 41°28′30″N 71°20′28″W

- Active: 1895-1950
- Country: United States
- Branch: United States Army Coast Artillery Corps
- Type: Coast artillery
- Role: Harbor Defense Command
- Part of: First Army 1933–1941; Eastern Defense Command 1941–1945
- Garrison/HQ: Fort Adams, Newport, Rhode Island
- Motto: Hope
- Mascot: Oozlefinch

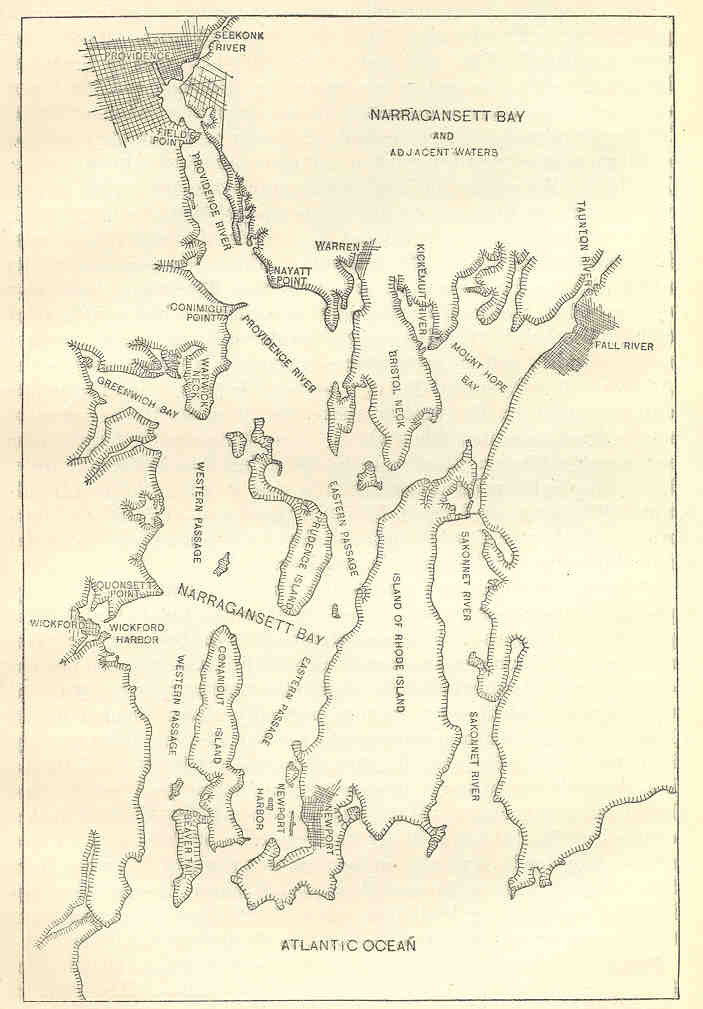
Map of Narragansett Bay.

The Harbor Defenses of Narragansett Bay was a United States Army Coast Artillery Corps harbor defense command. It coordinated the coast defenses of Narragansett Bay and Rhode Island from 1895 to 1950, beginning with the Endicott program. These included both coast artillery forts and underwater minefields. The command originated circa 1895 as an Artillery District, was renamed Coast Defenses of Narragansett Bay in 1913, and again renamed Harbor Defenses of Narragansett Bay in 1925.

== Geography ==
The southern part of Narragansett Bay is defined by the mainland to the east and west and by two large islands, Aquidneck Island to the east and Conanicut Island (which is also the town of Jamestown) to the west. Thus, the southern part of the bay is divided into three arms. The western arm is called the West Passage, between Conanicut Island and the mainland. The middle arm is called the East Passage, between Conanicut and Aquidneck Islands. Because the city of Newport and its sheltered harbor are on and defined by Aquidneck Island, the East Passage was the main area of fortification until the Endicott Period of the late 19th century. The eastern arm of the bay, between Aquidneck Island and the mainland, is called the Sakonnet River, although it is not geographically a river. The north end of it is too narrow and shallow for most vessels to pass, and thus it was not heavily fortified until World War II. The southwestern portion of Conanicut Island resembles a beaver, with the southern part called Beavertail and the northern part called Beaver Head.

== History ==
=== Early Rhode Island forts ===
==== Colonial period ====
Prior to the Revolution there was only one significant fort in Rhode Island: Fort Anne (later Fort George, eventually Fort Wolcott) on Goat Island in Newport harbor. The site was first fortified with an earthen battery in 1700, replaced by Fort Anne (named for the reigning Queen of England) in 1702. It was gradually enlarged until in 1727 it was described as a 50-gun stone fort, which in 1730 was renamed Fort George, after George II. In 1764 and 1769 two attacks on British ships by persons dissatisfied with British rule took place at and near the fort. In 1764 persons who believed HMS St John was carrying stolen goods from local merchants seized the unmanned Fort George and fired on the ship, which escaped. In 1769 HMS Liberty had seized two ships from Connecticut in the course of customs enforcement. The merchant captain whose ships had been seized led a mob which captured and burned the ship on Goat Island, near Fort George.

Another fortified site of the Colonial period was Brenton's Battery, on Brenton's Point in Newport, later the site of Fort Adams. This battery had four guns in 1641, and two guns in 1683. It was rebuilt in the 1750s.

==== Revolutionary War ====
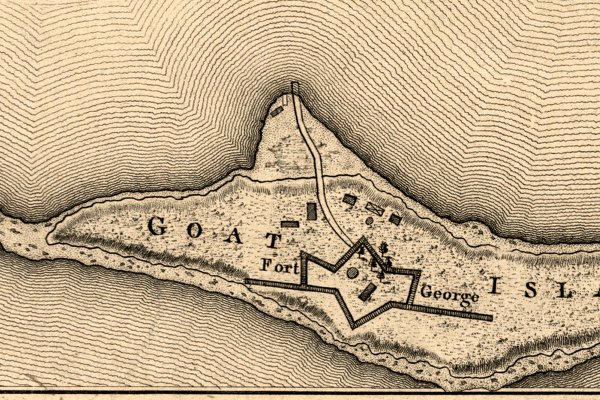
Fort George in 1777, from a map by Charles Blaskowitz.

In 1775 the American Revolution broke out. Fort George was seized by patriot forces and renamed Fort Liberty. In 1776 the fort was rearmed with 25 guns, a mix of 24- and 18-pounders, with a 50-man garrison under Captain Samuel Sweet. The patriots built at least two other batteries in Newport, one on Easton's Point at Battery Park, site of the later Fort Greene, and another at Castle Hill. The Easton's Point battery once forced the besieging HMS Scarborough to move away from the town. Another 12-gun battery was built on Conanicut Island across the bay from Newport, initially named the Dumpling Rock Battery or Fort Brown, after its commander, Abdiel Brown. This fort was also called Fort Conanicut after 1779. The patriots also fortified the bay's West Passage with the Beaver Tail Fort and the Conanicut Battery.

On 6, 10, and 14 April 1776, four guns at Brenton's Point manned by the Artillery Company of Newport drove off British ships attempting to attack Newport. Despite this, the British captured Newport on 8 December by assaulting the Beaver Tail Fort and Conanicut Battery in Jamestown, then sailing around the west and northeast parts of Conanicut Island to approach Newport from the north. They renamed the main fort as Fort George, and occupied the city for three years, building a barracks at Brenton's Point. The appearance of a French fleet off Newport in mid-1778 caused the British to scuttle some of their own ships in an attempt to block the harbor. Patriot forces attempted to recover Newport in August 1778, fighting the Battle of Rhode Island about seven miles north of the town, but were unsuccessful. However, the British abandoned Newport in October 1779, concentrating their forces in New York City. At this point Fort George was reoccupied by the patriots and became Fort Washington.

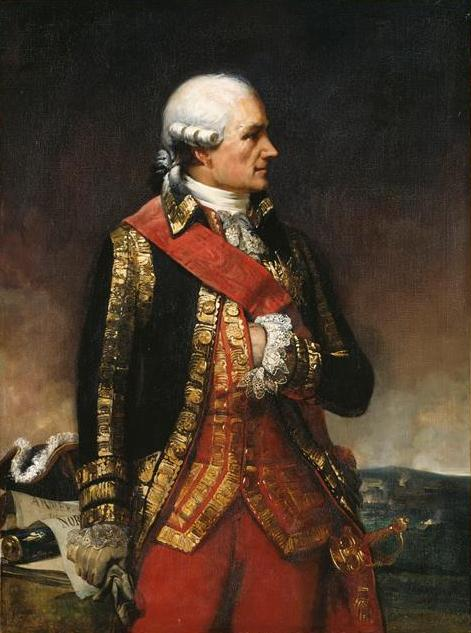
Jean-Baptiste Donatien de Vimeur, Comte de Rochambeau.

An expedition of 5,500 French troops under Count Rochambeau arrived in Newport by sea on 10 July 1780. They built Fort Chastellux (later known as Fort Harrison and Fort Denham) on high ground behind Goat Island (near King Avenue, later renamed Chastellux Avenue), not far from the current site of the Ida Lewis Yacht Club, and rebuilt and re-used the British barracks on Brenton's Point. A French map of this period reportedly shows a total of 39 forts and batteries in Newport and Middletown. A year later the French left Rhode Island to join Washington's forces north of New York City, eventually participating in the Yorktown campaign that effectively won the Revolution. Their overland route from Newport to Yorktown is marked today as the Washington–Rochambeau National Historic Trail.

==== 1783-War of 1812 ====
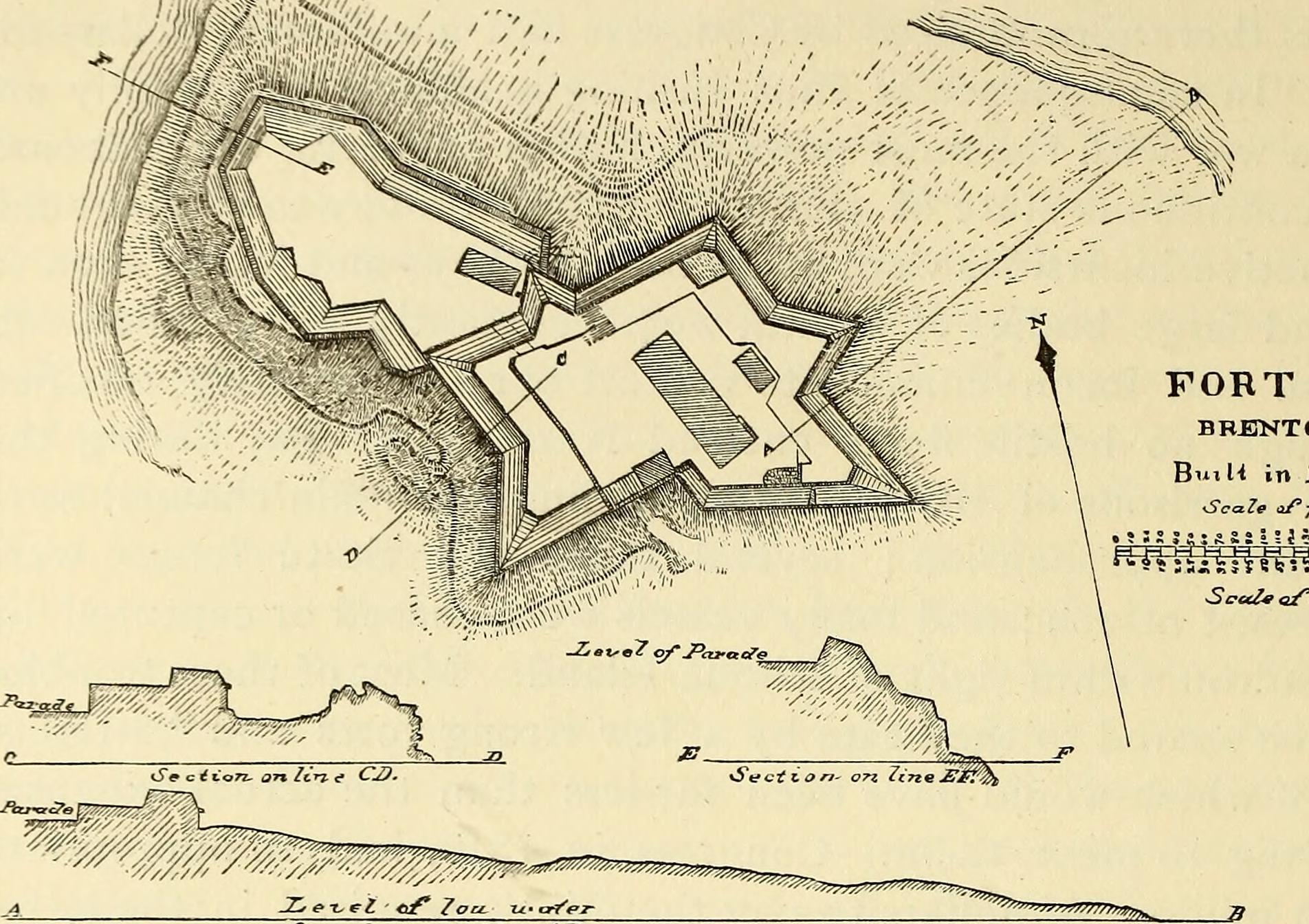
Plan of First System Fort Adams.

Newport received several new forts under the first system of US fortifications in the 1790s. By this time Newport was considered the most important coastal site in New England, with two companies of the Regular Army's Artillerists and Engineers stationed there. Its naturally well-protected harbor, if seized by an enemy, could serve as a base for land and sea attacks on Boston or New York. Major Louis Tousard, a French military engineer with the Corps of Artillerists and Engineers, designed all four of the new forts in the Newport area. The most significant was the first Fort Adams on Brenton's Point, on the site of the current Fort Adams, which mounted 17 guns. The other large fort was Fort Hamilton on Rose Island, northwest of the harbor and intended for 60 guns. However, construction on this fort was abandoned while still largely incomplete. Two smaller forts were a rebuilt Fort Dumpling on Conanicut Island with 8 guns, and the new Fort Greene on Easton's Point (also called North Point), mounting 12 guns on the site of the Revolutionary War battery. Fort Adams was completed in 1799, Fort Dumpling was completed in 1798, and Fort Greene was mostly complete when work was halted in 1800. In 1798 Fort Wolcott was renamed for the last time, after the recently deceased Oliver Wolcott, Governor of Connecticut and a general in the revolution. The fort was also refurbished with 38 guns.

Around 1806 a war scare with Great Britain prompted another round of fort construction that was later called the second system of US fortifications. In Rhode Island the improvements were modest, being limited to repairs at Fort Wolcott and Fort Adams. In the Secretary of War's report for 1811 Fort Dumpling was noted as incomplete, and Fort Greene was "in a state of ruin".

Rhode Island was not attacked in the War of 1812. State troops were mobilized to garrison Fort Adams and Fort Greene.

==== 1816-1890 ====
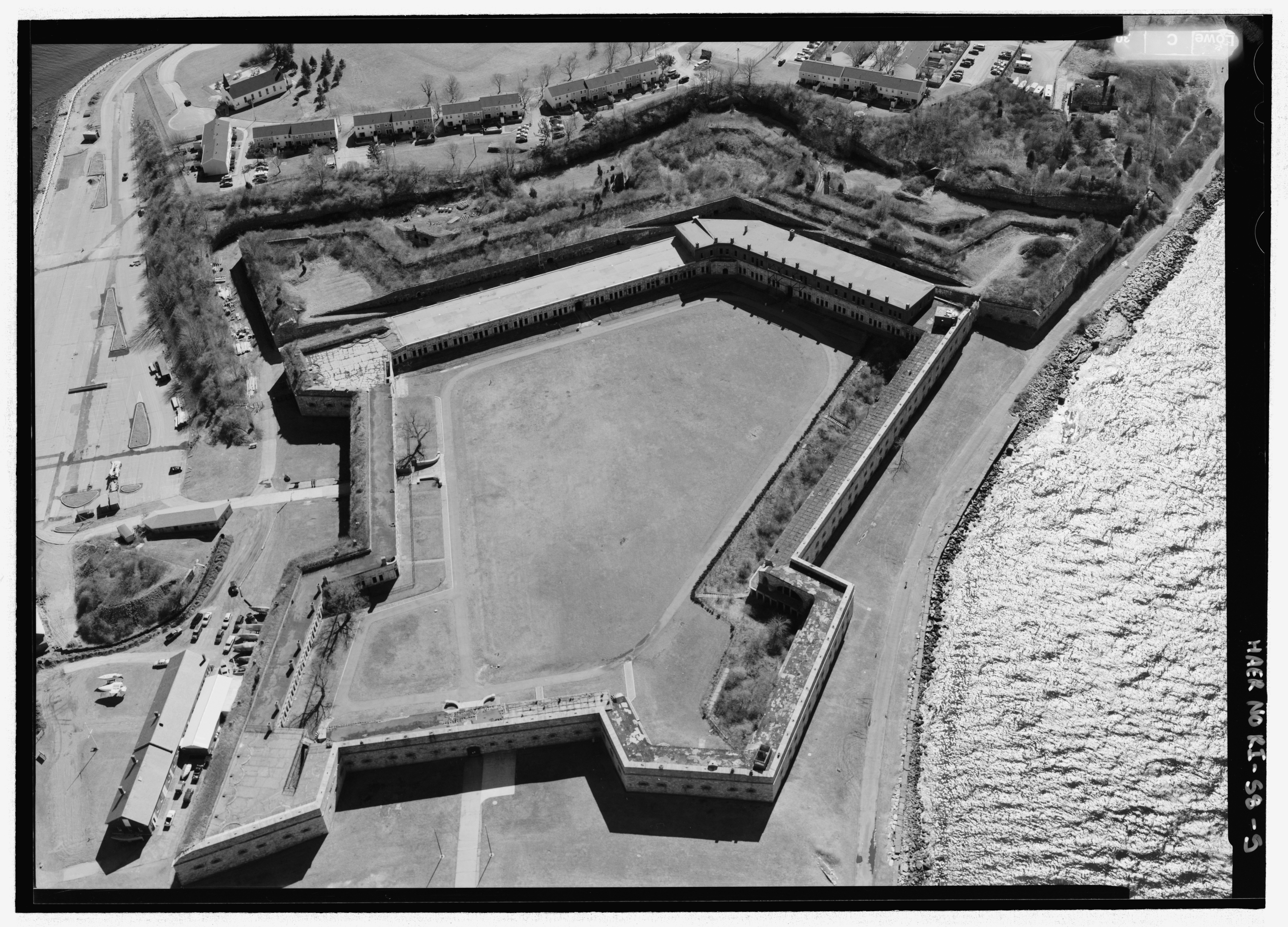
Aerial view of Fort Adams.

Although heavily fortified locations were not attacked in the War of 1812, the British managed to bypass or suppress the weak defenses at the mouth of Chesapeake Bay and burn Washington, DC. As a result, Congress approved a large-scale program of improved masonry forts, later called the third system of US fortifications, to replace the relatively small forts of the first and second systems. Newport was selected for one of the largest forts ever built in the United States, the new Fort Adams. Two other forts of the third system, Fort Monroe in Virginia and Fort Jefferson in Florida, were its only rivals in size in North America. Fort Adams' initial design was by French military engineer Simon Bernard, and the first 13 years of its construction were personally overseen by Joseph G. Totten of the Army Corps of Engineers, the foremost American fort designer. The fort was begun in 1825 and was first garrisoned in 1841, with construction continuing through 1858. A drawing in the National Archives shows that a similarly large fort in Jamestown on Conanicut Island, at the eventual location of Fort Wetherill, was considered but not approved. The new Fort Adams was unusual among American forts in having a tenaille and crownwork, plus a detached redoubt, protecting the fort on the landward side. These were designed to break up and channel an assault force, effectively forcing an attacker to resort to a long siege. In 1854 the fort was armed with 200 guns, and had positions for over 400. About 50 of these were 24-pounder flank howitzers, short-barreled guns for defense against an assault, mounted in casemates in the tenaille and redoubt.

Fort Wolcott went into caretaker status in 1836 and was never re-garrisoned; it was probably abandoned in the 1900s.

During the Civil War Fort Adams was an important mobilization center, and served as the home garrison of the 15th US Infantry Regiment. For a few months in 1861 it was also the US Naval Academy, which was transferred from Annapolis, Maryland to Newport due to the Confederate sympathies of Maryland. However, the academy soon moved to the Atlantic House hotel.

New defenses were also built on Dutch Island to guard the West Passage. An eight-gun battery was built and armed by the 14th Rhode Island Heavy Artillery (Colored) in 1863–64. A battery for eleven 10-inch Rodman guns was also built at the south end of the island; it extended in a north–south line and had wide arcs of fire on either side. However, it was vulnerable to flooding and was never armed.

The Civil War had shown that masonry forts were vulnerable to modern rifled cannon, particularly in the siege of Fort Pulaski near Savannah, Georgia in 1862. Also, the 15-inch (381 mm) smoothbore Rodman gun was introduced during the war. In the 1870s through 1890s Fort Adams was rearmed with eleven 15-inch Rodmans, thirteen 10-inch (254 mm) Rodmans in the original casemates, and four 100-pounder (6.4-inch (163 mm)) Parrott rifles in a set of casemates that pointed south towards potential attackers. New earth-protected positions were built for five of the 15-inch guns, two atop the southwest corner of the fort and three new positions south of the fort; the remainder were on the barbette tier atop the fort. Parrott rifles had shown an alarming tendency to burst when fired, so procurement was stopped shortly after the Civil War and they were deployed only in limited quantities.

In 1867-69 a battery for six 15-inch Rodman guns was built on Dutch Island and armed with five of the weapons. In 1870 a massive fort mounting forty 15-inch Rodman guns was proposed for Dutch Island, but funding for this was cut off in 1875, and within a few years nearly all coast defense funding was cut off nationwide.

In 1869 the Naval Torpedo Station was founded on Goat Island; this became the US Navy's primary research, development, and manufacturing center for torpedoes. In the 1880s the Naval Station Newport and the Naval War College were established on Coasters Harbor Island; the naval base and the adjacent anchorage grew in size and importance through World War II, making their protection increasingly important.

=== Endicott period ===
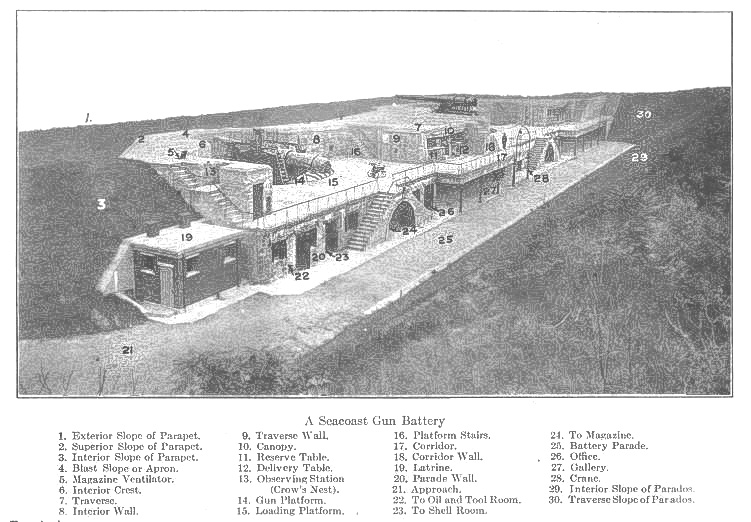
Typical US disappearing gun battery for two guns.

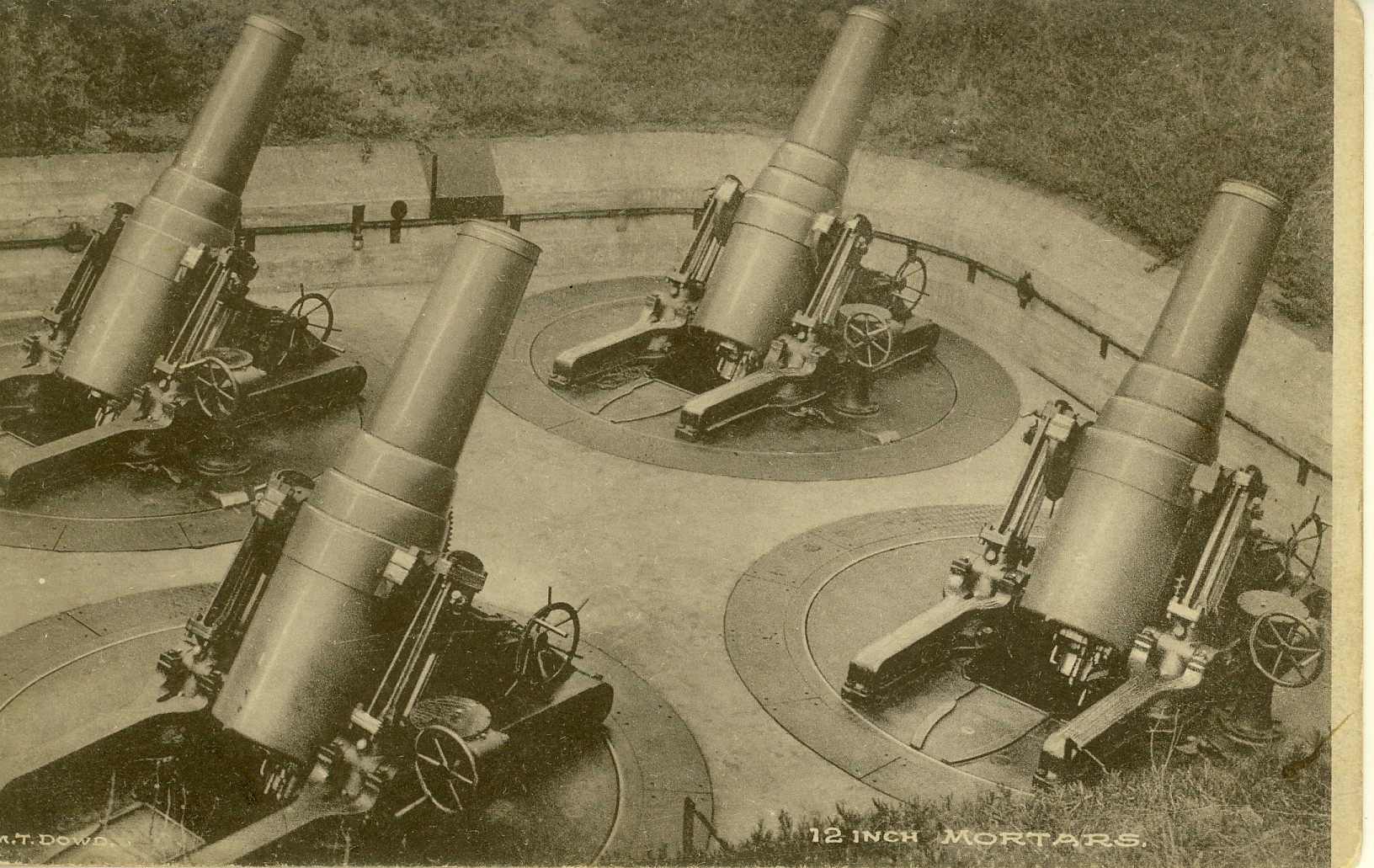
12-inch mortars at Fort Greble, Dutch Island.

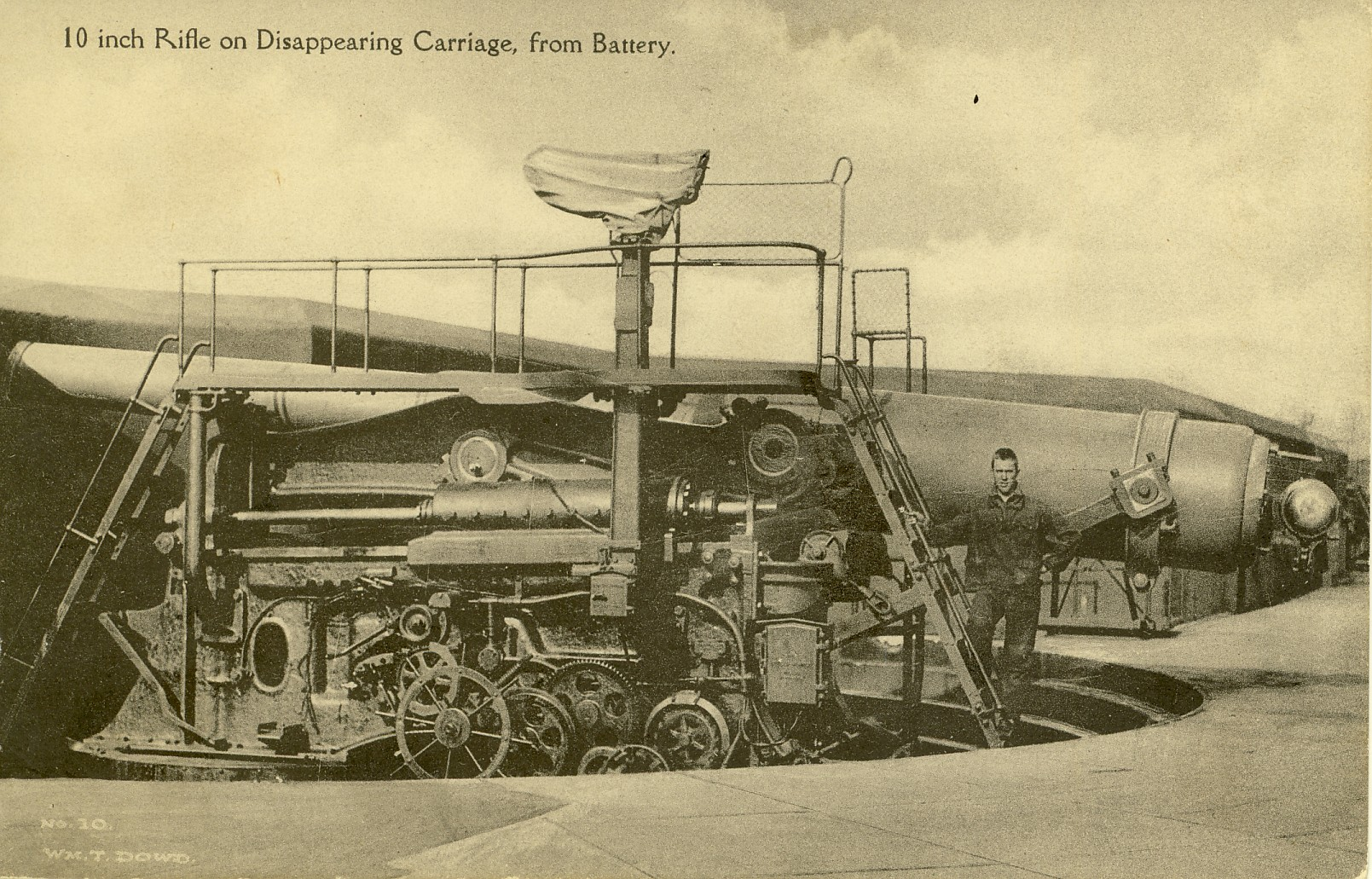
10-inch gun M1888 on disappearing carriage M1896, Fort Greble, Dutch Island.

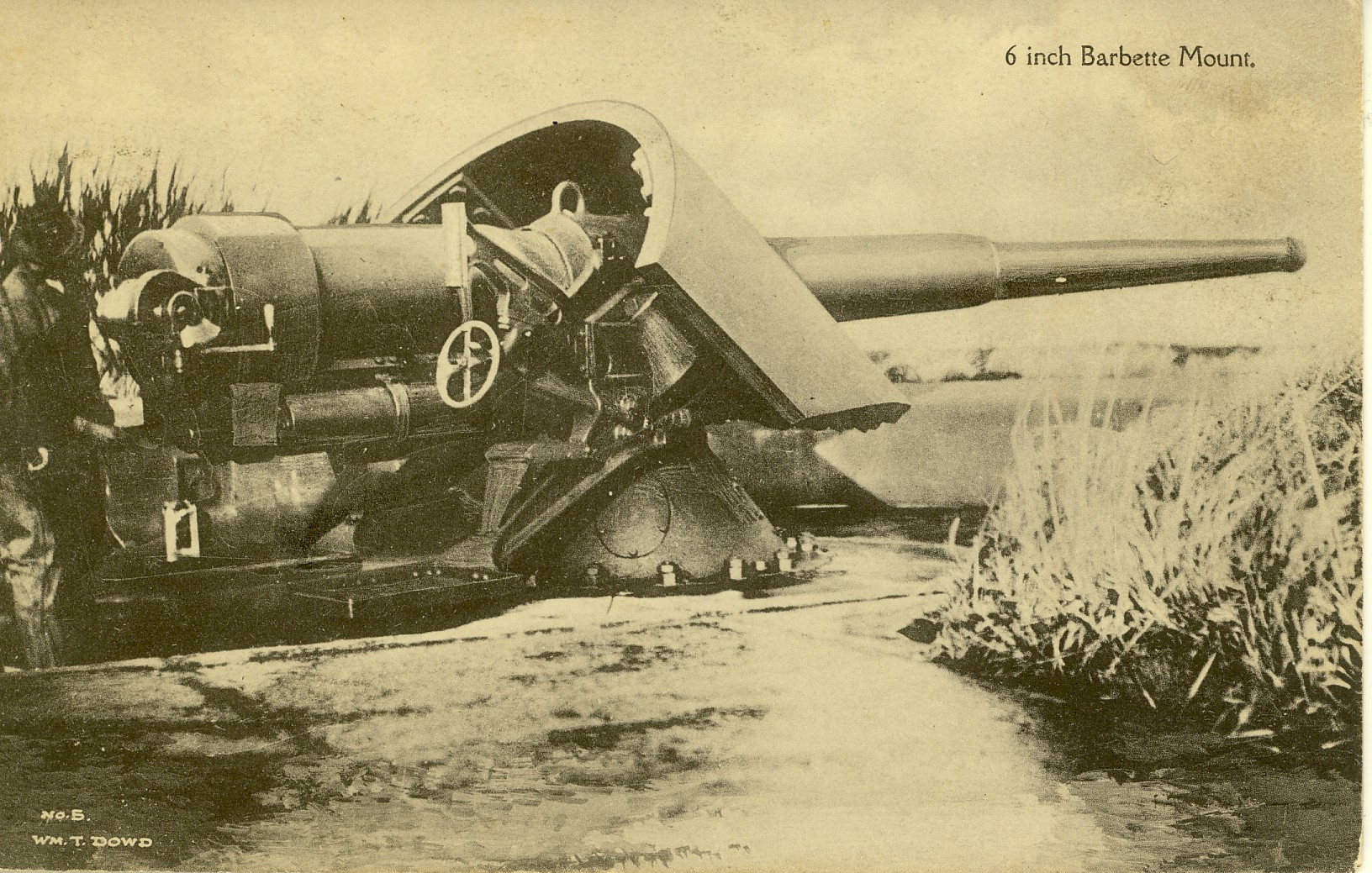
6-inch gun M1900 on pedestal mount M1900, probably at Fort Getty.

The Board of Fortifications was convened in 1885 under Secretary of War William Crowninshield Endicott to develop recommendations for a full replacement of existing coast defenses. Most of its recommendations were adopted, and construction began in 1897 on new forts to defend Narragansett Bay. Two underwater minefields in the East and West Passages also guarded the bay. The defenses of the East Passage were the new Fort Wetherill and new batteries at Fort Adams, south of the main fort. The West Passage was adequately defended for the first time with three new forts. These were Fort Getty on Beaver Head in Jamestown, Fort Greble on Dutch Island, and Fort Kearny in Saunderstown on the mainland, opposite Dutch Island. Fort Wetherill was the largest of the new forts in armament, and included the mine planting and storage facilities for the area.

Heavy weapons for the East Passage included four 12-inch (305 mm) guns at Fort Wetherill (two on barbette carriages, two on disappearing carriages), with three 10-inch (254 mm) disappearing guns there, along with sixteen 12-inch (305 mm) mortars and two 10-inch (254 mm) disappearing guns at Fort Adams. The West Passage had three 10-inch disappearing guns and eight 12-inch mortars at Fort Greble, with three 12-inch disappearing guns at Fort Getty. Medium caliber weapons in the initial design were five 6-inch (152 mm) guns at Fort Wetherill (two disappearing, two on pedestal mounts), three 6-inch disappearing guns at Fort Greble, and two 6-inch pedestal guns at Fort Getty, along with six 6-inch disappearing guns at Fort Kearny. Each fort had at least one battery of 3-inch (76 mm) guns to defend the minefields against minesweepers.

Generally, the heavy batteries were built first, followed by the 3-inch and then the 6-inch batteries. However, the Spanish–American War broke out in early 1898. Most of the Endicott batteries were still years from completion, and it was feared the Spanish fleet would bombard the US east coast. A number of batteries of medium-caliber rapid-fire guns were hastily built. Fort Adams received a one-gun battery with an 8-inch M1888 gun (203 mm) on a modified Rodman carriage, and a battery of two 4.72-inch (120 mm) Armstrong guns. Fort Getty received a single 6-inch (152 mm) Armstrong gun.

Another Endicott-program fort was built in Rhode Island, part of the Coast Defenses of Long Island Sound. This was Fort Mansfield, on Napatree Point in Westerly. The fort was intended to guard the strait between Westerly and Fishers Island. It was one of the smallest Endicott forts, with two 8-inch disappearing guns and four 5-inch guns. However, an exercise in 1907 showed that the nearby beach could be invaded in a sector the guns could not cover, thus the fort was vulnerable to capture. The fort was placed in caretaker status in 1909 and disarmed to provide guns for World War I in 1917. It was abandoned and sold in 1928.

The initial Endicott batteries were completed in 1907. Some of the Spanish–American War batteries were short-lived; Fort Getty lost its 6-inch Armstrong gun by 1900, along with Fort Adams' single 8-inch gun. However, in 1907 there was a re-alignment of 6-inch Armstrong guns. Fort Adams received a battery of three 6-inch Armstrong guns as a result. In 1913 these were transferred to Pearl Harbor, Hawaii.

=== World War I ===
The American entry into World War I brought many changes to the Coast Artillery and the Coast Defenses of Narragansett Bay (CD Narragansett Bay). Numerous temporary buildings were constructed at the forts to accommodate the wartime mobilization. As the only component of the Army with heavy artillery experience and significant manpower, the Coast Artillery was chosen to operate almost all US-manned heavy and railway artillery in that war. Stateside garrisons were drawn down to provide experienced gun crews on the Western Front; the first two regiments designated to operate French-made railway artillery in France (and their brigade headquarters) mobilized at Fort Adams along with other units. Some weapons were removed from forts with the intent of getting US-made artillery into the fight. 8-inch, 10-inch, and 12-inch guns and 12-inch mortars were converted to railway artillery, while 5-inch and 6-inch guns became field guns on wheeled carriages. 12-inch mortars were also removed to improve reload times by reducing the number of mortars in a pit from four to two. Few railway artillery pieces were mounted and few or none saw action before the Armistice. The remounted 5-inch and 6-inch guns were sent to France, but their units did not complete training in time to see action. The 5-inch guns were removed from service in 1920.

By this time, pedestal mounts for 6-inch guns were known to be superior to disappearing mounts, being able to more rapidly track targets with a faster rate of fire. Thus, most disappearing guns (except the M1897, shorter than the others) were dismounted for use as field guns, while most of the few pedestal guns dismounted were returned to the forts soon after the war. The removed 6-inch disappearing guns (primarily M1903 and M1905) were stored and many returned to service in World War II.

Fort Wetherill lost a 10-inch gun (transferred to Fort Greble) and its three 6-inch disappearing guns. Fort Adams' pair of 10-inch guns was dismounted in 1917, and after some delay transferred in 1919 to Fort Strong in the Harbor Defenses of Boston to replace guns removed there. Fort Greble lost a 10-inch gun (replaced by Fort Wetherill's gun in 1918) and its three 6-inch disappearing guns. Fort Kearny lost four of its six 6-inch disappearing guns. The mortar batteries at Fort Adams and Fort Greble were all halved in size (to eight and four mortars respectively) to improve the rate of fire.

A pair of 4.72-inch Armstrong guns, transferred from Fort Strong in Boston Harbor, were mounted at Sachuest Point in Middletown to guard the Sakonnet River from 1917 to 1919. A misspelling of Sachuest Point as "Sauchet Point" on the gun cards for these weapons led to their destination being lost; it is often assumed incorrectly that they were Fort Adams' guns of the same type.

As the Naval Torpedo Station expanded, Fort Wolcott was probably completely demolished in 1917–18.

References indicate the authorized strength of CD Narragansett Bay in World War I was 32 companies, including 14 from the Rhode Island National Guard.

=== Interwar ===
After World War I two- or three-gun antiaircraft batteries armed with M1917 3-inch (76 mm) guns on fixed mounts were built at Fort Adams, Fort Wetherill, and Fort Greble (at least). Fort Adams also had a pair of truck-mounted M1916 3-inch AA guns. Some of these weapons remained in service through early World War II, others were replaced by towed 3-inch guns in the 1930s.

In 1920 a number of weapons deployed in limited quantities, plus the 3-inch gun M1898, were declared obsolete and removed from the forts. These included all of the 4.72-inch Armstrong guns. One of the Sachuest Point guns is preserved as a memorial in Ansonia, Connecticut. Both of Fort Adams' guns survive: one is preserved as a memorial in Equality Park, Newport, RI; the other was initially at Westerly Armory, but was later traded to Fort Moultrie near Charleston, SC.

On 1 July 1924 the harbor defense garrisons completed the transition from a company-based organization to a regimental one, and on 9 June 1925 the commands were renamed from "Coast Defenses..." to "Harbor Defenses...". The 10th Coast Artillery was the Regular Army component of HD Narragansett Bay from 1 July 1924 through 25 February 1944, although only the regimental headquarters and headquarters battery was active from 1924 through 1939. The 243rd Coast Artillery was the Rhode Island National Guard component of HD Narragansett Bay from 11 July 1924 through 7 October 1944.

In 1936 Fort Wetherill's remaining pair of 10-inch guns were transferred to Fort H. G. Wright on Fishers Island, New York, to replace guns there.

=== World War II ===
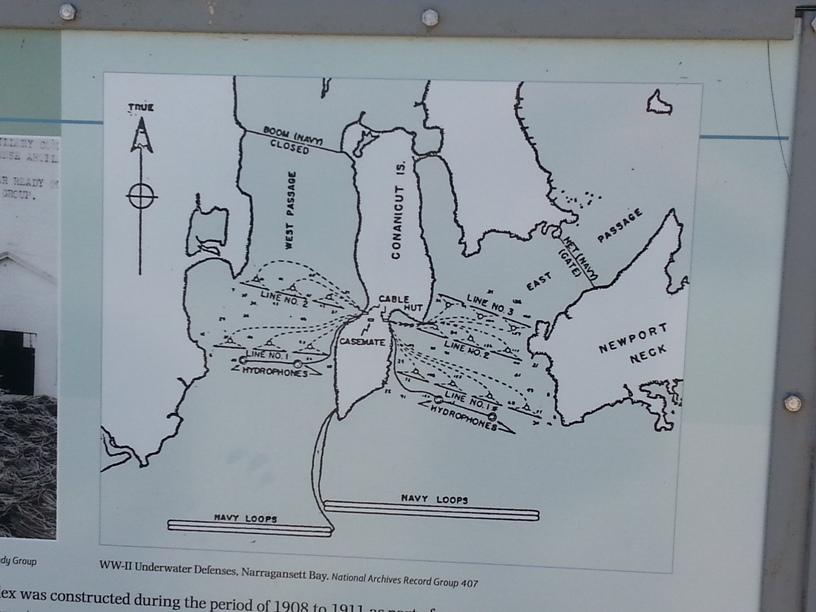
Map of Narragansett Bay mine, net, boom, and magnetic detection defenses in World War II, on a plaque at Fort Wetherill.

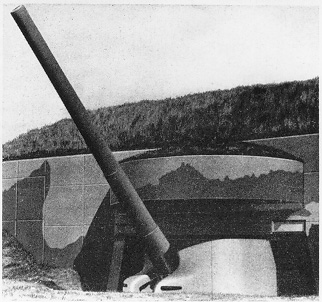
16-inch casemated gun, similar to those at Fort Church and Fort Greene.

Early in World War II numerous temporary buildings were again constructed to accommodate the rapid mobilization of men and equipment. Two batteries of the 10th Coast Artillery were activated on 1 July 1939 and 1 September 1940, followed by four more batteries on 10 February 1941. The 243rd Coast Artillery was activated on 16 September 1940. After the Fall of France in 1940 the Army decided to replace all existing heavy coast defense guns with 16-inch guns. HD Narragansett Bay became centered on Fort Church in Little Compton and Fort Greene in the Point Judith section of Narragansett. Fort Church was built 1939-1942 and Fort Greene's first 16-inch battery was completed in 1942. Each fort initially had a casemated battery of two 16-inch (406 mm) guns, Battery Gray a.k.a. Battery 107 at Fort Church and Battery Hamilton a.k.a. Battery 108 at Fort Greene. Another 16-inch battery, Battery 109 at Fort Greene, was also built but not armed. Two additional 16-inch batteries, Battery 110 and Battery 114, were proposed for Fort Burnside on Beavertail and the Oak's Inn Military Reservation in Misquamicut but were not built. Battery 114 would have been under the Harbor Defenses of Long Island Sound. Narragansett Bay was one area in which, as gun ranges increased, the fort locations moved seaward.

Fort Church also had a rare casemated battery of two 8-inch (203 mm) guns, known as Battery Reilly.

The 16-inch batteries were supplemented by new 6-inch (152 mm) batteries. These included heavy earth-covered concrete bunkers for ammunition and fire control, with the guns protected by open-back shields. The guns for these batteries were mostly the 6-inch guns removed in World War I for field service and stored since that war; a new 6-inch gun M1 of similar characteristics was developed when this supply of guns began to run out. Three of these batteries were built in HD Narragansett Bay: Battery 211 at Fort Greene, Battery 212 at Fort Church, and Battery 213 at Fort Burnside.

Four 155 mm (6.1 inch) batteries were emplaced in Rhode Island in 1942 to quickly provide some defense at key points. These had towed guns on "Panama mounts", circular concrete platforms to support the guns. Two guns were at Fort Church, four at what is now Brenton Point State Park in the southwest part of Newport, four guns at Fort Greene, and four at the Oak's Inn Military Reservation. The last battery was under the Harbor Defenses of Long Island Sound.

As the new defenses were built, in 1942-43 the vast majority of the older guns were scrapped. However, some of the 6-inch pedestal guns and 3-inch guns were retained in service through the end of the war, although most of these were relocated due to the new defenses shifting seaward. Fort Varnum was established as a result of this. This fort had two 6-inch pedestal guns from Fort Getty and emplacements intended for two 3-inch guns from Fort Kearny. However, the 3-inch guns were unserviceable and moved to storage; a 90 mm battery was placed there instead. Fort Wetherill retained its pair of 6-inch pedestal guns. Fort Burnside gained a pair of 3-inch guns from Fort Getty. All the original Endicott-era guns of Forts Adams, Getty, Greble, and Kearny were removed or scrapped by 1944.

Five 90 mm gun Anti-Motor Torpedo Boat (AMTB) batteries were built or deployed in the Narragansett Bay area. These had 90 mm dual-purpose (anti-surface and anti-aircraft) guns. Each battery was authorized two 90 mm guns on fixed mounts, two on towed mounts, and two single 37 mm guns, although the weapons on hand varied. AMTB 921 was at Fort Varnum and/or Fort Kearny with two fixed 90 mm guns and two 37 mm guns. AMTB 922 was at Fort Getty (the only armament there) with two fixed 90 mm guns. AMTB 923 was at Brenton Point near the 155 mm battery when completed in July 1943 and moved to Fort Wetherill in July 1944, with two fixed and two mobile 90 mm guns and two 37 mm guns. Along with the move in July 1944, the 37 mm guns in the AMTB batteries were upgraded to 40 mm Bofors guns. AMTB 924 was at Fort Wetherill with two mobile 90 mm guns. AMTB 925 was at Fort Adams with two mobile 90 mm guns.

The US Navy also participated in defending the Narragansett Bay area with net defenses and submarine-detecting indicator loops, including a station at Fort Burnside (Station 1H). Four 5-inch (127 mm) antiaircraft guns (probably the widely-available 5"/38 caliber gun) were emplaced on Rose Island in 1942, replaced by an Army battery of four 90 mm AA guns in 1943.

Following mobilization in 1940 HD Narragansett Bay was subordinate to First Army. On 24 December 1941 the Eastern Theater of Operations (renamed the Eastern Defense Command three months later) was established, with all east coast harbor defense commands subordinate to it, along with antiaircraft and fighter assets. This command was disestablished in 1946.

Unlike most of the eastern harbor defense commands, fire control towers in Rhode Island were low-profile. Many were two stories tall and disguised as seaside cottages, or were dug into rock outcroppings. In World War II an Army-Navy harbor entrance control post-harbor defense command post was built at Fort Burnside, resembling a seaside mansion.

The removal of most weapons and an Army-wide shift from a regimental to a battalion-based system meant organizational changes in Rhode Island's defenses. On 25 February 1944 the 10th Coast Artillery was effectively disestablished, and on 7 October 1944 the 243rd Coast Artillery was redesignated as the 188th and 189th Coast Artillery Battalions, which themselves were disestablished on 1 April 1945. Personnel from these units were absorbed by HD Narragansett Bay.

Some of the Rhode Island forts served as POW camps during World War II, including Fort Getty, Fort Greble, and Fort Kearny. The latter was the headquarters of a program to re-educate German prisoners with democratic values, one element of which was the German-language newspaper Der Ruf (The Call).

=== Post World War II ===
Following the war, it was soon determined that gun defenses were obsolete, and they were scrapped by the end of 1948, with remaining harbor defense functions turned over to the Navy. In 1950 the Coast Artillery Corps and all Army harbor defense commands were dissolved. Today the Air Defense Artillery carries the lineage of some Coast Artillery units. In Rhode Island the 243rd Regional Training Institute of the Rhode Island Army National Guard at Camp Varnum (formerly Fort Varnum) carries the lineage of the 243rd Coast Artillery. In the 1950s a ring of Nike missile sites was built around Providence, but none of the former coast defense sites were used. The Nike sites were deactivated circa 1972. From circa 1960 to 1974 NAVRADSTA Jamestown, a Navy radio facility, operated at the former Fort Burnside with a tower 600 feet (180 m) tall.

== Present ==
The accessibility, visibility, and state of preservation of Rhode Island's forts varies widely. Fort Adams is in Fort Adams State Park, but the fort is accessible only via guided tours in summer. The Endicott batteries are mostly fenced off. However, major efforts in 2016-2017 have removed overgrowth from much of the main fort, the redoubt, and some of the outlying batteries. Some of the officers' quarters from the Endicott era are preserved, notably the Eisenhower House. In town on the south side of the harbor is a memorial to Rochambeau's landing in Newport; the statue has a duplicate on the Avenue Pierre-Ier-de-Serbie (Peter I of Serbia) in Paris. Fort Wetherill is in Fort Wetherill State Park, in a variable state of preservation but mostly accessible. Parts of the batteries are fenced off or overgrown, but enough is accessible for a good idea of what they looked like. Much of the concrete is crumbling, possibly due to the salty air as well as the heavy graffiti applied. There are some interpretive plaques, especially around the mine support buildings, which are well-preserved. Fort Getty is a recreational vehicle campground with a significant entrance fee, and most of the batteries are buried. The Conanicut Battery is a public park with ruins dating from the British occupation. Fort Burnside is now Beavertail State Park; the 6-inch and 3-inch batteries can be viewed but are overgrown, and the park headquarters in the harbor entrance control post can be seen. Fort Greble is well-preserved but a boat is needed to get to Dutch Island.

The Artillery Company of Newport still exists as a reenactor club, and their 19th-century armory in Newport has a museum of weapons and uniforms from all eras of US history that is open to the public.

Fort Kearny is now the Narragansett Bay Campus of the University of Rhode Island; the batteries are well-preserved and some have been converted as offices. However, a nuclear research reactor has been built atop one battery. Fort Varnum is now Camp Varnum of the Rhode Island Army National Guard; it is well-preserved but not normally accessible to the public. It includes World War II gun emplacements and several fire control "cottages".

Fort Greene consisted of three separate reservations in Point Judith. The East Reservation is now the Fort Greene Army Reserve Center and has the 16-inch Battery Hamilton, but is not normally accessible to the public. The West Reservation is the campground of Fishermen's Memorial State Park, and includes the 16-inch Battery 109 and a Plotting, Switchboard, and Radio (PSR) bunker housing a plotting room as part of the Coast Artillery fire control system. It also has a fire control tower resembling a barn silo. Battery 109 is overgrown, although a path to the top of the bunker is maintained. The South Reservation is near Point Judith Light and is the seaside portion of the park. The actual Fishermen's Memorial is next to the ammunition bunker of Battery 211, and a path leads to the top of the bunker. A 6-inch gun platform is in front of the bunker, now separated from it by beach erosion. However, no interpretation of the park's military history is provided.

Most remains of Rhode Island's other forts have been demolished or buried. Parts of two bastions of Fort Hamilton on Rose Island remain, along with at least three World War II 5-inch gun emplacements. Fort Wolcott is completely demolished, but a plaque on Goat Island commemorates it. Fort Church's batteries are all buried or built on, and are on private property.

== Coat of arms ==
- Blazon
  - Shield: The shield is red on the upper half for artillery, and blue below taken from the arms of Rhode Island, which has a gold anchor on a blue shield. The dividing line between these two colors is embattled to show fortifications. On the red is the gold sundial-compass of Roger Williams (Date 1638), the founder of the Colony of Rhode Island and Providence Plantations. In the lower half is a gold fleur-de-lis, to commemorate the services of the French during the Revolution.
  - Crest: The crest is two gold crossed cannons supporting the anchor of Rhode Island in blue.
  - Motto: The motto of the state, Hope, is also used by the coast defenses.
- Symbolism: The anchor, the device of Rhode Island, is the symbol of stability.
- Background: The coat of arms was initially approved in 1919 for the Coast Defenses of Narragansett Bay.

== See also ==
- Seacoast defense in the United States
- Harbor Defense Command
- List of coastal fortifications of the United States
