= Fort Whitman =

Coordinates: 48°21′48.8″N 122°32′09.4″W

Fort Whitman (Washington) was an Endicott Board fortification on Goat Island, Puget Sound, Washington state, just offshore of La Conner, a part of the Harbor Defenses of Puget Sound.

The fort was named after Marcus Whitman in 1910. It was previously thought that warships could not negotiate Deception Pass, but a Navy gunboat made it through the previous year. Thus it was deemed an important defensive location.

It comprised a single 4 gun 6" DC battery, Battery Harrison, and mine control structures. The usual barracks and other support facilities were temporary and built for the duration, excepting a caretaker's quarters. It protected the confined back passage east of Fidalgo Island, Skagit Bay. By World War II, the six-inch DCs were no longer required; the main armament was 37mm AMTB guns.

Except during wartime, the fort remained on caretaking status throughout its existence.
