= Conanicut Battery =

- U.S. National Register of Historic Places
- Location within Rhode Island Location within the United States
- Location: Jamestown, Rhode Island
- Coordinates: 41°28′49″N 71°23′38″W
- Built: 1776
- NRHP reference No.: 73000055
- Added to NRHP: July 2, 1973

The Conanicut Battery is a colonial and 20th century military battery in Jamestown, Rhode Island, west of Beaver Tail Road. The site offers a commanding view of the West Passage of Narragansett Bay.

During the American Revolutionary War, local militia constructed an earthen battery on the site. The British occupied Jamestown later that year and took over the site, occupying the space until August 1778 when the French fleet arrived. Its principal surviving feature is an earthworks measuring about 150 feet (46 m) long and 75 feet (23 m) wide. The site is marked by a plaque placed by the Daughters of the American Revolution in 1931. During the early 20th century, the U.S. military built large partially underground defensive batteries in the area, notably Fort Getty and Fort Burnside.

The 22-acre site was added to the National Register of Historic Places in 1973. It is now owned by the town. The Friends of Conanicut Battery and the Jamestown Historical Society are active in preserving the fort.

== See also ==
- National Register of Historic Places listings in Newport County, Rhode Island

== References and external links ==
- Conanicut Battery information Spring 2012 (PDF)
- Conanicut Battery information Spring 2017 (PDF)
- Conanicut Battery at Jamestown Historical Society
- Conanicut Battery at American Forts Network
- Conanicut Battery at FortWiki.com
