= Camp Varnum =

Rhode Island Army National Guard training facility

Fort Varnum
- Part of Harbor Defenses of Narragansett Bay
- Boston Neck, Narragansett, Rhode Island
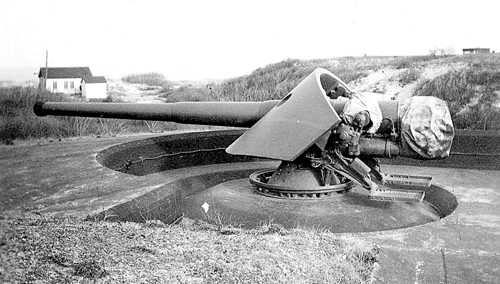
- 6-inch M1900 gun on a pedestal mount, similar to the guns at Fort Varnum.

Site information
- Type: Coastal Defense, later National Guard training center
- Owner: Rhode Island Army National Guard
- Controlled by: Rhode Island Army National Guard
- Open to the public: no

Location
- Location in Rhode Island
- Coordinates: 41°26′47″N 71°26′00″W

Site history
- Built: 1942
- Built by: United States Army
- In use: 1942–present
- Battles/wars: World War II

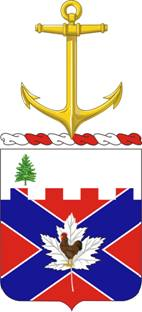
Coat of arms of the 243rd Regiment (Regional Training Institute)

Camp Varnum is a Rhode Island Army National Guard training facility in the Boston Neck area of Narragansett, Rhode Island. During World War II it was Fort Varnum, a coastal defense fort.

== History ==
Fort Varnum was built as part of a general modernization of US coast defenses begun in 1940 with the outbreak of war in Europe and the Fall of France. The fort is named for General James Mitchell Varnum of the Revolutionary War. It was built to relocate previously-emplaced weapons to a more useful location nearer the entrance to Narragansett Bay. The fort was sited to reinforce new 6-inch gun batteries at Fort Greene in Point Judith and Fort Burnside in Jamestown.

The fort was intended to protect the West Passage of Narragansett Bay as part of the Harbor Defenses of Narragansett Bay. Fort Varnum's main armament was Battery House, two 6-inch M1900 guns on pedestal mounts, completed in 1942. The battery was a relocation of Battery House at Fort Getty in Jamestown. Two 3-inch M1903 guns on pedestal mounts were planned for Battery Armistead, relocated from Fort Kearny, now the University of Rhode Island Narragansett Bay Campus. However, these guns arrived in unusable condition, and Fort Varnum's commander asked that they be scrapped. They were stored instead and were never mounted. Better light weapons were provided in 1943 as Anti-Motor Torpedo Boat Battery (AMTB) 921, with four 90 mm guns, two on fixed mounts and two on towed mounts.

Several fire control stations were built in Narragansett disguised as beach cottages; these may date from the start of the Endicott Program circa 1900. Most have been destroyed; some survive at Camp Varnum. In 1947, with the war over, Fort Varnum's guns were scrapped along with almost all other US coast artillery weapons.

== Present ==
Camp Varnum is a Rhode Island Army National Guard training facility, the home of the 243rd Regiment (Regional Training Institute).

== See also ==
- Seacoast defense in the United States
- United States Army Coast Artillery Corps
