= Beavertail State Park =

State park in Rhode Island, United States

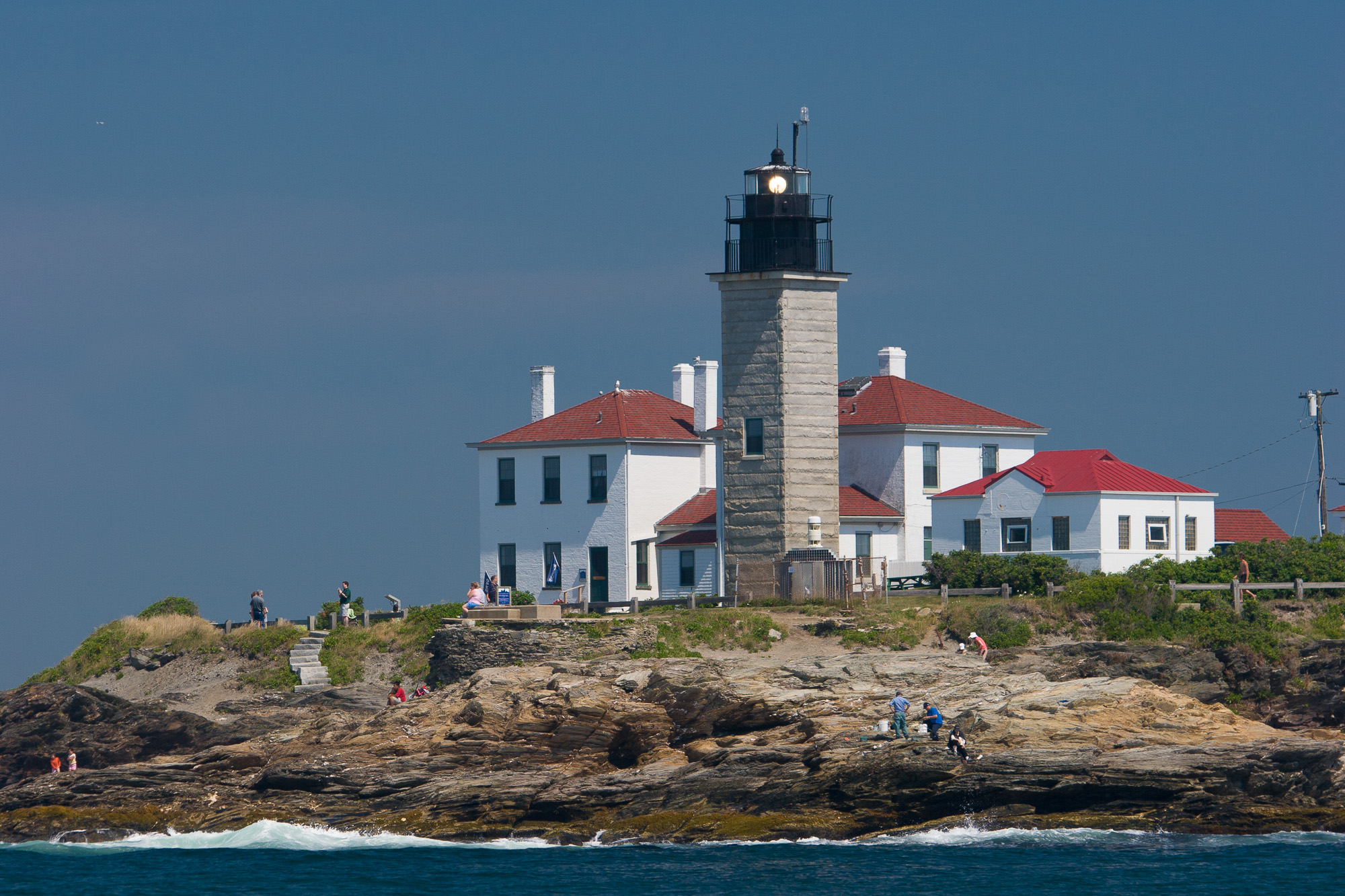
- Beavertail Lighthouse

- Location within Rhode Island
- Interactive map of Beavertail State Park
- Location: Jamestown, Rhode Island, United States
- Coordinates: 41°26′56″N 71°23′58″W
- Area: 153 acres (62 ha)
- Elevation: 10 ft (3.0 m)
- Established: 1980
- Administrator: Rhode Island Department of Environmental Management Division of Parks & Recreation
- Website: Official website
- Rhode Island State Parks

Beavertail State Park is a public recreation area encompassing 153 acres (62 ha) at the southern end of Conanicut Island in Narragansett Bay, Rhode Island. The state park's main attraction is the active Beavertail Lighthouse, the current tower of which dates from 1856. During World War II, the park area was part of Fort Burnside, one of several coastal fortifications designed to protect Narragansett Bay. The park's scenic shoreline offers hiking, picnicking, and saltwater fishing.

== History ==
=== Lighthouse ===
A 58-foot wooden tower built in 1749, under the direction of architect Peter Harrison of Newport, burned down in 1753. It was replaced by a fieldstone tower which was in use until 1856, when the present tower and keeper's quarters were completed. The assistant keeper's house, which was built in 1898, now houses the Beavertail Lighthouse Museum.

=== Coastal fortifications ===
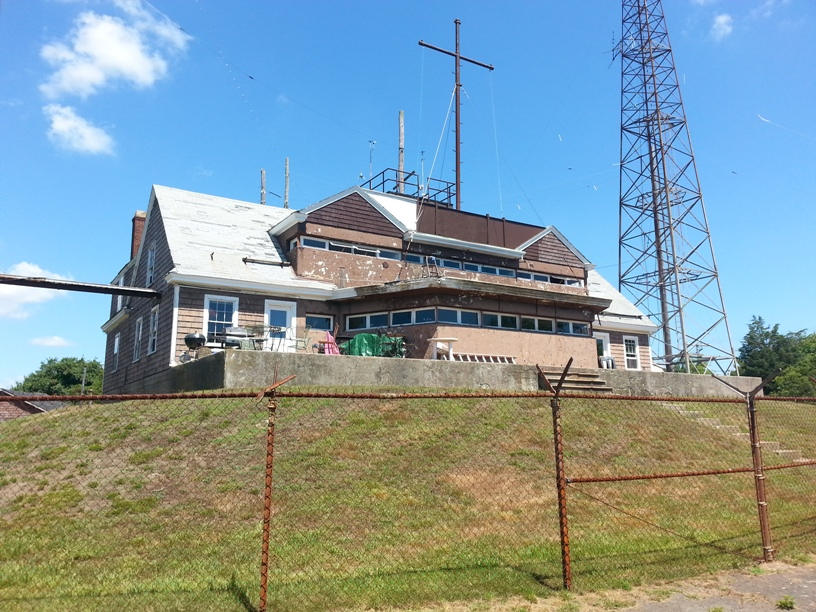
Former joint Army-Navy Harbor Entrance Control Post disguised as a mansion at the former Fort Burnside.

In 1776, during the American Revolution, the Beaver Tail Fort was built in conjunction with the Conanicut Battery near Beaver Head. These forts were captured by the British when they seized the Newport area in December 1778, and later used by the Americans and French after the British withdrew in October 1779.

6-inch gun M1905 on shielded barbette carriage at Fort Columbia State Park, Washington state, similar to the guns at Fort Burnside.

Fort Burnside was established in 1942 as part of the Harbor Defenses of Narragansett Bay. By late 1943, a battery of two 6-inch guns (152 mm) and a battery of two 3-inch guns (76 mm) were established. The 6-inch battery was called Battery Construction Number (BCN) 213, with ammunition magazines in a large bunker and the guns in shielded mounts. The 3-inch battery was called Battery Whiting; the guns were relocated from Fort Getty and the battery name was retained. A large Army-Navy Harbor Entrance Control Post, disguised as a seaside mansion, was also built and still exists. Fort Burnside also hosted a US Navy indicator loop station for detecting submarines (Station 1H). A battery of two 16-inch guns (406 mm), similar to those at Fort Church and Fort Greene and called BCN 110, was proposed for Fort Burnside but never built. With the war over, Fort Burnside's guns were scrapped in 1948.

=== Radio station ===
From circa 1960 to 1974, part of the former Fort Burnside was used for the Naval Radio Station (NAVRADSTA) Jamestown, part of Naval Communications Station (NAVCOMMSTA) Newport. It had a distinctive 600-foot (180-meter) radio tower.

=== State park ===
The state created Beavertail State Park in 1980, after the site was declared federal surplus land. The park is used for sightseeing, hiking, picnicking, and saltwater fishing. Nature programs are offered seasonally.

== See also ==
- Seacoast defense in the United States
- United States Army Coast Artillery Corps
