= Fort Getty =

- Jamestown, Newport, Rhode Island in United States
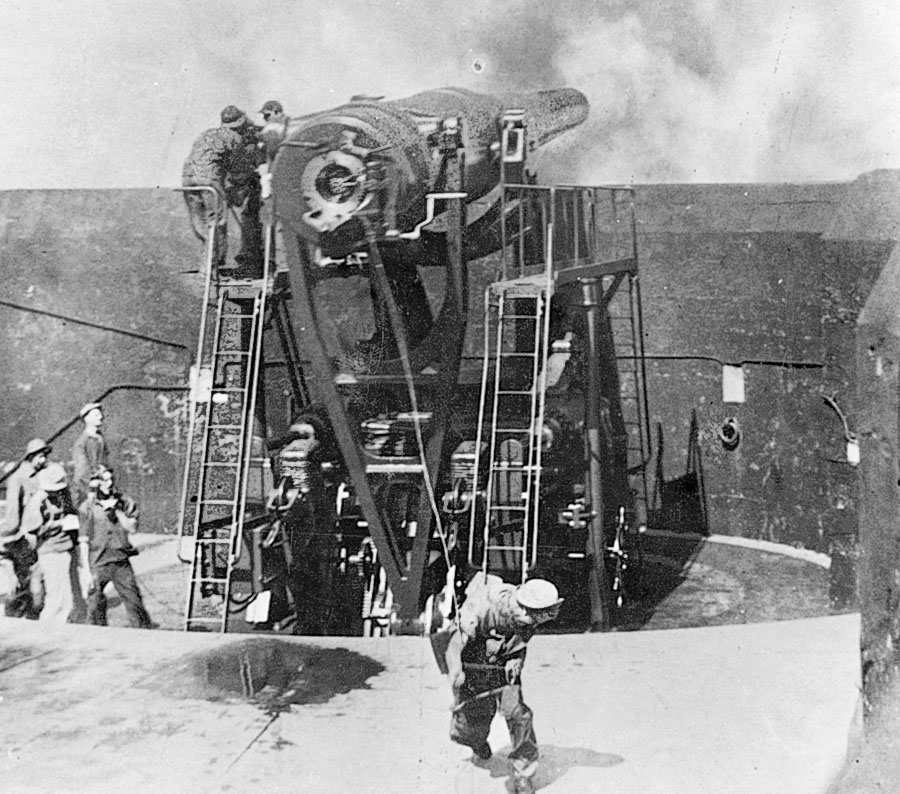
- 12-inch disappearing gun, similar to those formerly mounted at Fort Getty

Site information
- Type: Fort

Location
- Location in Rhode Island
- Coordinates: 41°29′26″N 71°23′56″W

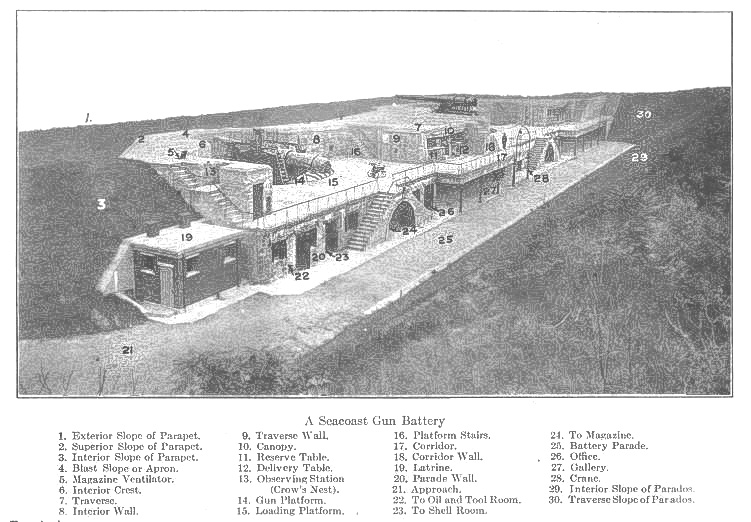
A US coast defense battery with two guns on disappearing carriages, similar to the 12-inch gun battery at Fort Getty.

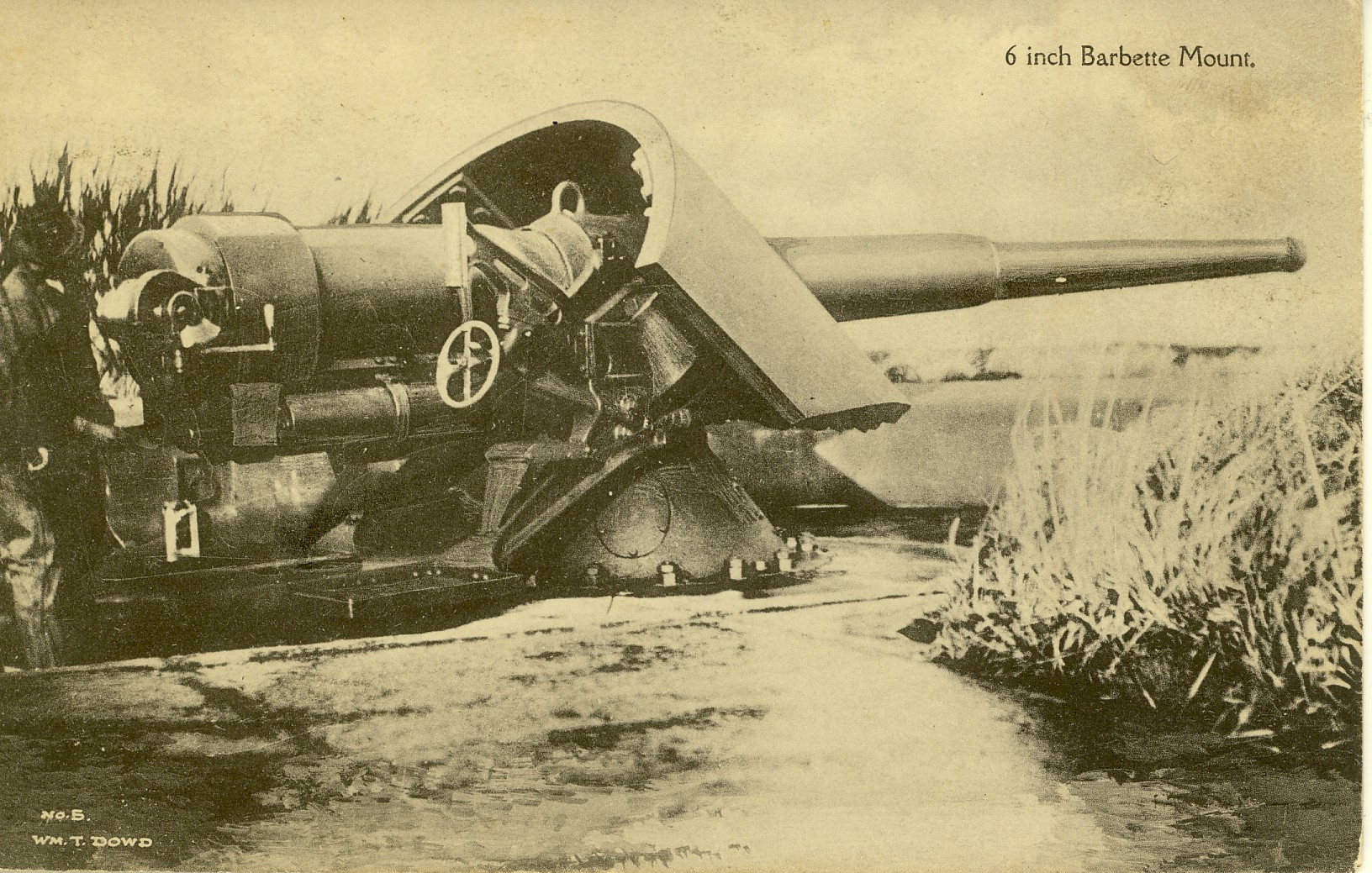
6-inch gun M1900 on barbette (pedestal) carriage M1900, probably at Fort Getty.

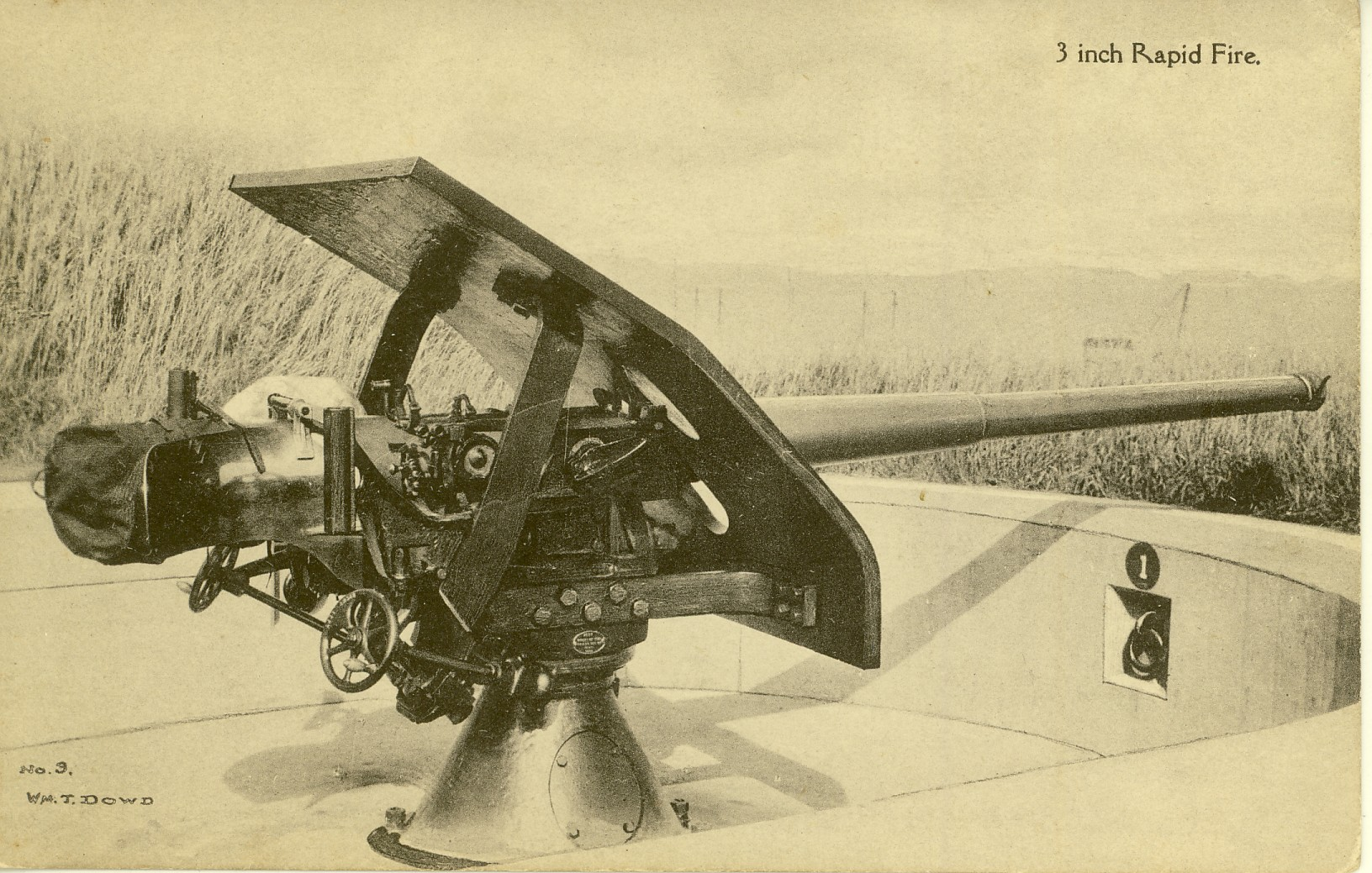
3-inch M1903 mine defense gun, probably at Fort Getty.

Fort Getty is a town park in Jamestown, Rhode Island, on Conanicut Island in Narragansett Bay. From 1900 through World War II it was a military fort. The Town of Jamestown later received the property and opened it as a park, primarily a campground.

== History ==
Fort Getty's construction began in 1901 to defend the West Passage of Narragansett Bay as part of the Coast Defenses of Narragansett Bay (renamed Harbor Defenses in 1925). The fort was named for Colonel George W. Getty, who had a distinguished career in the Mexican–American War, American Civil War, and afterward. The fort's three gun batteries were completed by 1905 but for some reason were not accepted until 1910. They were Battery Tousard with three 12-inch M1900 guns (305 mm) on disappearing carriages, Battery House with two 6-inch M1900 guns (152 mm) on pedestal mounts, and Battery Whiting with two 3-inch M1903 guns (76 mm) on pedestal mounts.

Battery Tousard was named for Louis de Tousard, an engineer and artillery officer with much involvement in early American fortifications. Battery House was named for Major General James House, who commanded Fort Wolcott in Newport in 1811. Battery Whiting was named for Levi Whiting, an artillery officer in the War of 1812.

Fort Getty went into caretaker status soon after completion, but was garrisoned in World War I as a sub-post of Fort Greble.

Early in World War II the fort's location was largely superseded by new defenses centered on Fort Church and Fort Greene. In 1942, the 12-inch guns were scrapped, Battery House's 6-inch guns were relocated to Fort Varnum, and Battery Whiting's 3-inch guns were relocated to Fort Burnside. The fort became a prisoner-of-war camp for German prisoners. However, in 1943 a new Anti-Motor Torpedo Boat Battery, AMTB 922 with four 90 mm guns arrived. Two of the guns were on fixed mounts and two were on towed mounts.

In 1948, the fort was disestablished, as were essentially all US coast defenses.

== Visiting today ==
Dutch Island, the site of the former Fort Greble, lies near the fort and is a short boat ride from Fort Getty Park. The park also has facilities for RVs. As of 2015, there are 83 seasonal RV sites and 24 tent sites. The gun batteries have been partially buried but portions are still visible. The park has many amenities including a dock at the tip of Beaverhead and a pavilion which is popularly used for birthdays, graduations, and weddings.

== See also ==
- Seacoast defense in the United States
- United States Army Coast Artillery Corps
