= Fort Greene (Narragansett, Rhode Island) =

US Army Reserve base

- Part of Harbor Defenses of Narragansett Bay
- Point Judith, Narragansett, Rhode Island

Site information
- Type: Coastal Defense
- Owner: US Army Reserve, State of Rhode Island
- Controlled by: US Army Reserve, Fishermen's Memorial State Park
- Open to the public: yes (part)

Location
- Location in Rhode Island
- Coordinates: 41°22′53″N 71°29′00″W

Site history
- Built: 1943
- Built by: United States Army
- In use: 1943-present
- Battles/wars: World War II

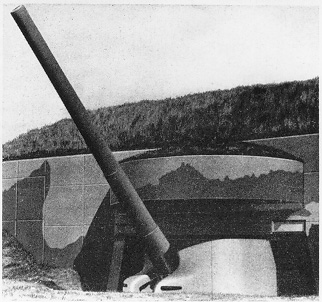
16-inch casemated gun, similar to those at Fort Greene.

6-inch gun M1905 on shielded barbette carriage at Fort Columbia State Park, Washington state, similar to the guns of BCN 211 near Point Judith Light.

Fort Greene is a United States Army Reserve installation in the Point Judith area of Narragansett, Rhode Island. During World War II this was a coastal defense fort, and together with Fort Church in Little Compton, it superseded all previous heavy gun defenses in the Harbor Defenses of Narragansett Bay. It is named for General Nathanael Greene of the Revolutionary War, who was born in Rhode Island.

== History ==
Fort Greene was built as part of a general modernization of US coast defenses, begun in 1940 with the outbreak of war in Europe and the Fall of France. The goal was to replace all previous heavy weapons, most of which were over 35 years old, with long-range ex-Navy 16"/50 caliber Mark 2 guns. Lighter weapons would be replaced by 6-inch guns on high-angle shielded barbette carriages. Ammunition magazines and the 16-inch guns would be in casemated bunkers to protect against air attack.

The fort was intended to protect the approaches to Narragansett Bay as part of the Harbor Defenses of Narragansett Bay, and with a range of over 45,000 yards (41,000 m) it could protect the eastern approaches to Long Island Sound as well. It was mirrored by Fort Church in Little Compton near Sakonnet Point. Three reservations were acquired for Fort Greene 1939-1942, which was initially known as the Point Judith Military Reservation. The East Reservation was at the present Fort Greene Army Reserve Center, while the West and South Reservations are the present Fishermen's Memorial State Park. The South Reservation was near Point Judith Light. Battery Hamilton, or Battery Construction Number (BCN) 108, was on the East Reservation and had two 16-inch guns. BCN 109 was on the West Reservation and was designed for two 16-inch guns, but was never armed. To the west of BCN 109, also in the park, is a Plotting, Switchboard, and Radio (PSR) bunker. BCN 211 with two 6-inch guns was on the South Reservation, along with four "Panama mounts" (circular concrete platforms) for towed 155 mm guns. The Point Judith Fishermen's Memorial is next to the bunker of BCN 211; a path is also available to the top of the bunker. No interpretation of the military facilities in the park is provided. In 1947, with the war over, Fort Greene's guns were scrapped along with almost all other US coast artillery weapons.

Several fire control stations were built in Narragansett, disguised as beach cottages as part of the Coast Artillery fire control system; these may date from the start of the Endicott Program circa 1900. Most have been destroyed; one (badly damaged by storms) is near BCN 211, and some survive and have been restored at the Camp Varnum National Guard facility, formerly Fort Varnum.

== Present ==
A former 16-inch gun battery (BCN 109), which was never armed, is in the campground of Fishermen's Memorial State Park on the former west reservation, along with a Plotting, Switchboard, and Radio (PSR) bunker housing a plotting room as part of the Coast Artillery fire control system. The Fort Greene Army Reserve facility, on the east reservation, includes the former 16-inch Battery Hamilton. The former 6-inch gun battery (BCN 211) remains near Point Judith Light, on the former south reservation, also part of the state park. The fishermen's memorial is next to the bunker, and one of the gun blocks is on the (much eroded) beach in front of BCN 211.

== Gallery ==
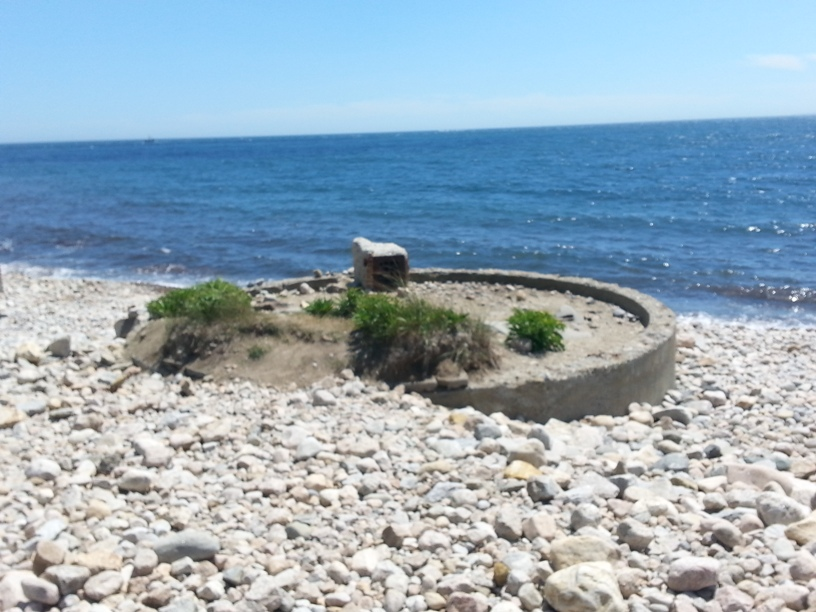
6-inch gun position at BCN 211, former Fort Greene south reservation

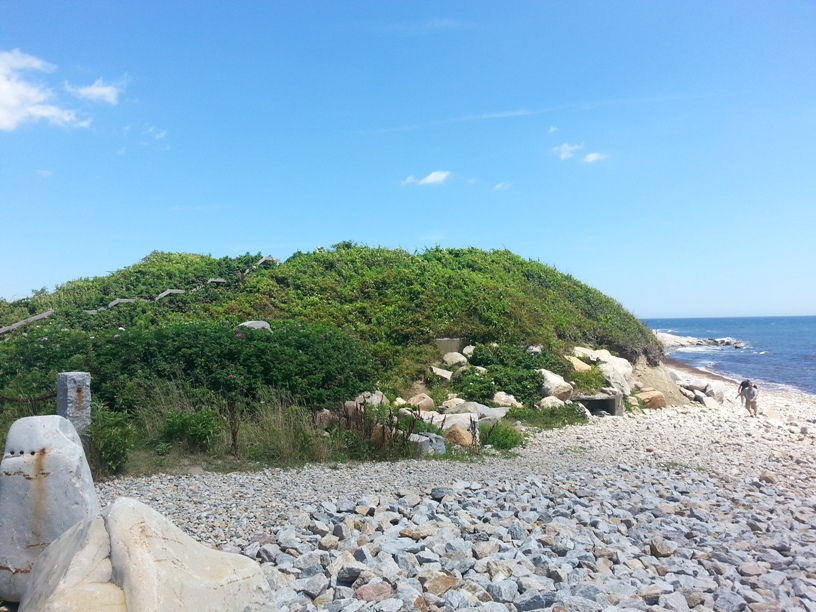
Ammunition and fire control bunker for BCN 211, former Fort Greene south reservation

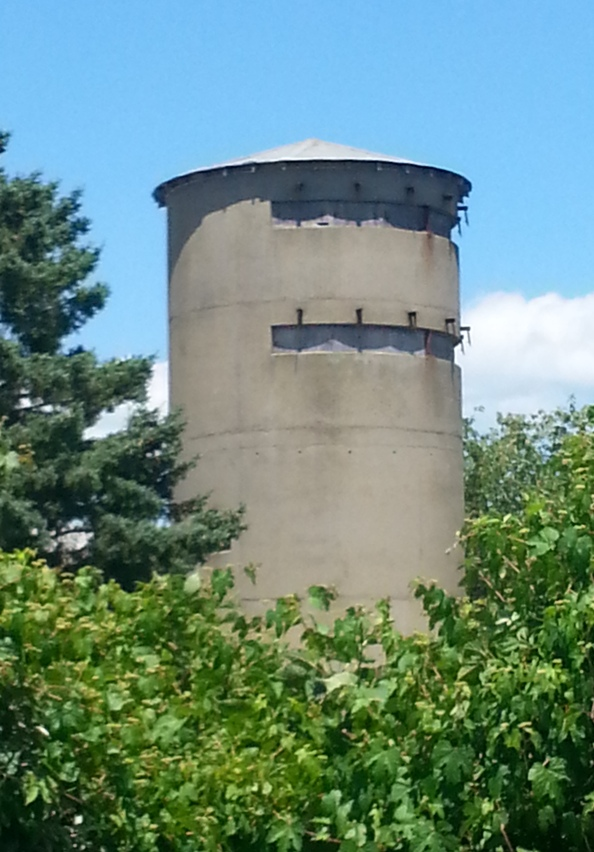
Former fire control tower resembling a barn silo, former Fort Greene west reservation

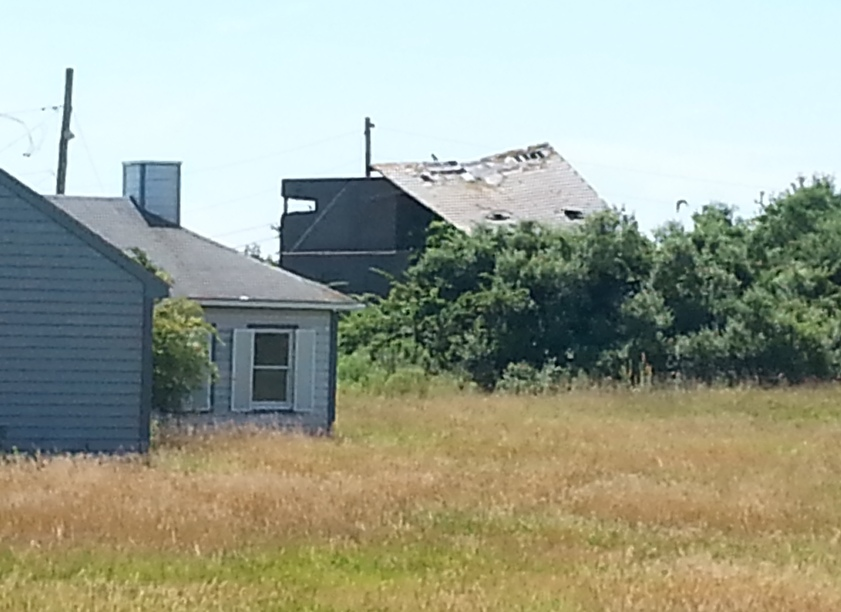
Storm-damaged former fire control tower resembling a beach cottage, former Fort Greene south reservation

== See also ==
- Seacoast defense in the United States
- United States Army Coast Artillery Corps
