= Fort Church (Rhode Island) =

- Part of Harbor Defenses of Narragansett Bay
- Little Compton, Rhode Island

Site information
- Type: Coastal Defense
- Owner: various
- Controlled by: various
- Condition: mostly buried

Location
- Location in Rhode Island
- Coordinates: 41°28′46″N 71°11′00″W

Site history
- Built: 1942
- Built by: United States Army
- In use: 1942—1948
- Battles/wars: World War II

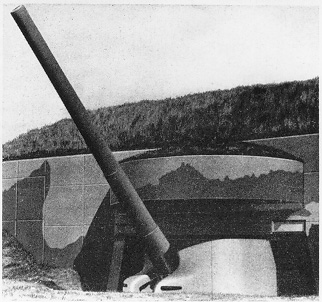
16-inch casemated gun, similar to those at Fort Church.

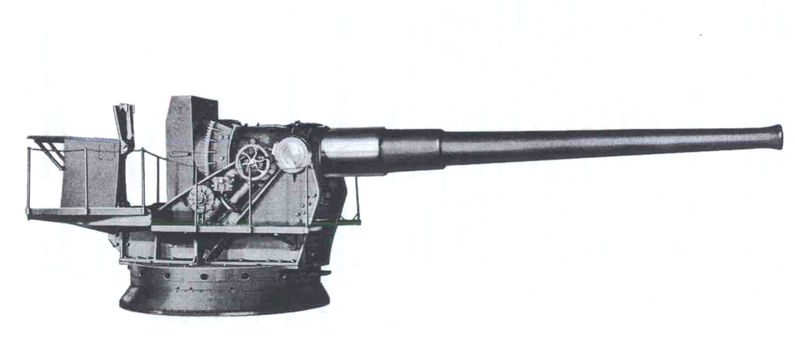
8-inch Navy MkVIM3 gun on barbette mount M1A1, as used at Fort Church.

6-inch gun M1905 on shielded barbette carriage at Fort Columbia State Park, Washington state, similar to the guns of BCN 212 near Sakonnet Point.

Fort Church was a World War II United States Army coastal defense fort in Little Compton, Rhode Island. Together with Fort Greene near Point Judith, it superseded all previous heavy gun defenses in the Harbor Defenses of Narragansett Bay.

== History ==
Fort Church was built as part of a general modernization of US coast defenses that began in 1940 with the outbreak of war in Europe and the Fall of France. The fort was named for Colonel Benjamin Church (1639–1718), considered a forerunner of the United States Army Rangers and buried in Little Compton. The goal was to replace all previous heavy weapons, many of which were over 35 years old, with long-range 16"/50 caliber Mark 2 guns. Lighter weapons would be replaced by 6-inch guns on high-angle shielded barbette carriages. Ammunition magazines and the 16-inch guns would be in casemated bunkers to protect against air attack. Fort Church also had a rare casemated 8-inch gun battery.

The fort was intended to protect the approaches to Narragansett Bay and its easternmost arm, called the Sakonnet River, as part of the Harbor Defenses of Narragansett Bay. It was mirrored by Fort Greene near Point Judith.

Three reservations were acquired for Fort Church 1939–1942, which was initially named the Sakonnet Point Military Reservation. The North Reservation was at the Sakonnet Golf Club, the East Reservation was near Briggs Marsh and South Main Road, and the South Reservation was near Sakonnet Point itself. Battery Gray, or Battery Construction Number (BCN) 107, was on the North Reservation and had two 16-inch guns. Battery Reilly was on the East Reservation with two casemated 8-inch guns. BCN 212 with two 6-inch guns was on the South Reservation, along with two "Panama mounts" (circular concrete platforms) for towed 155 mm guns.

Battery Gray was named for Major Quinn Gray. Battery Reilly was named for Captain Henry J. Reilly (1845–1900), who was killed at Peking, China in the Boxer Rebellion.

In 1948, with the war over, Fort Church's guns were scrapped along with almost all other US coast artillery weapons.

== Present ==
The batteries at Fort Church have all been buried or built over.

== See also ==
- Seacoast defense in the United States
- United States Army Coast Artillery Corps
