= U.S. Army Museum of Hawaii =

Museum in Honolulu, Hawaii, US

The U.S. Army Museum of Hawai'i
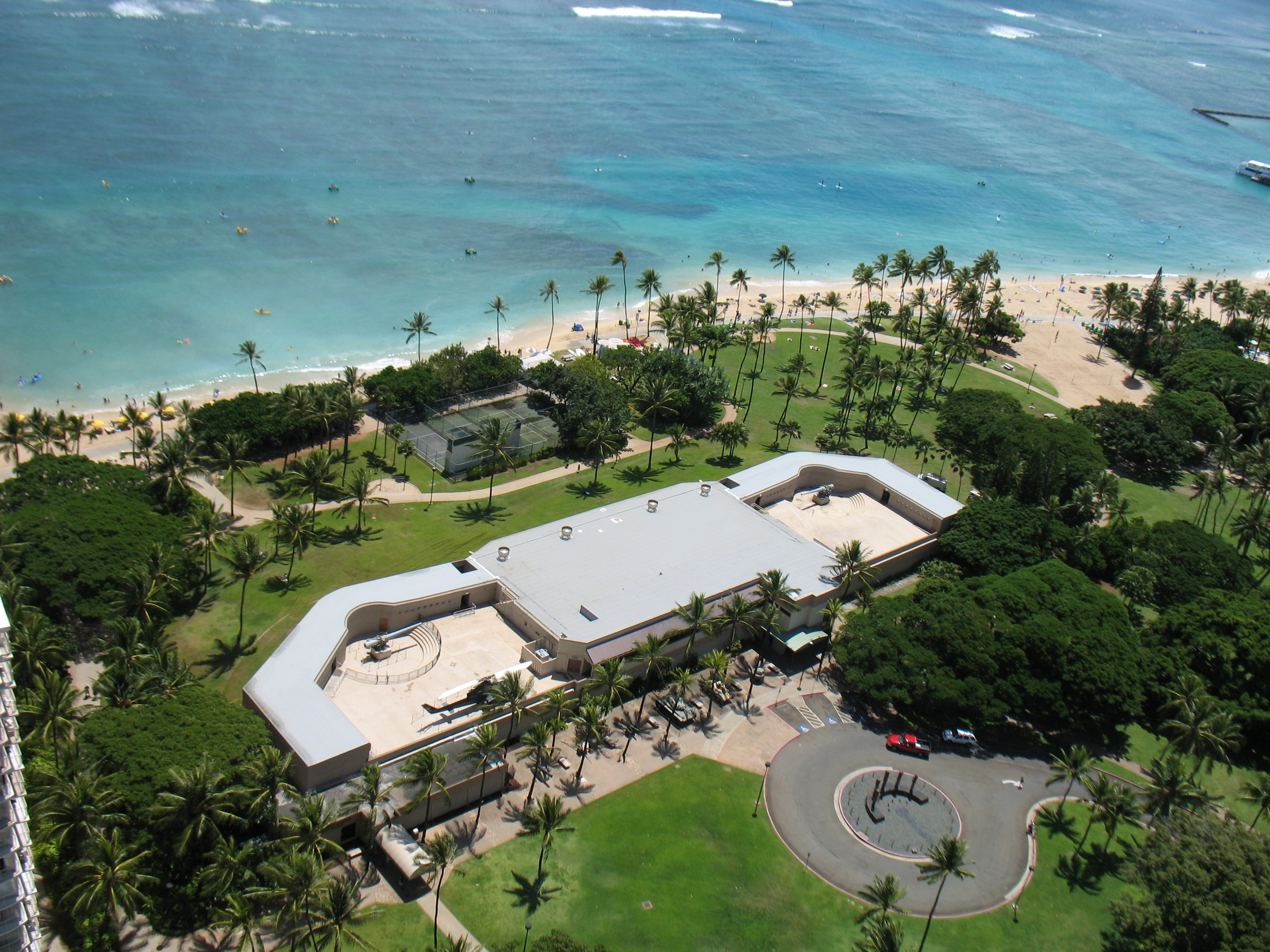
- Established: 1976
- Location: 2131 Kalia Rd., Honolulu, Hawai'i 96815
- Coordinates: 21.2815°N 157.835°W
- Type: Military museum
- Owner: United States Army
- Website: https://www.hiarmymuseumsoc.org/

The U.S. Army Museum of Hawaii is a U.S. Department of Defense-owned museum housed inside Battery Randolph, a former coastal artillery battery, located at Fort DeRussy Military Reservation. The battery was transformed into a museum in 1976. The Hawai’i Army Museum Society (HAMS) was chartered in the same year with a mission to support the U.S. Army Museum of Hawai’i. (Note: HAMS writes Hawaiʻi in the group's name both with and without ʻokina, and, consistent with local usage, often refers to the museum as the "Army Museum of Hawaiʻi." U.S. Army sources, consistent with Federal norms, write the museum's name without okina.) The museum's collection contains two World War II armor pieces (the US M24 Chaffee and the Japanese Type 95 Ha-Go light tank), an AH-1 Cobra helicopter, and small arms indoors, as well as the battery itself. The battery's 14-inch main guns were scrapped after World War II and have since been replaced with two 7-inch naval guns that were previously mounted on the battleship USS New Hampshire.

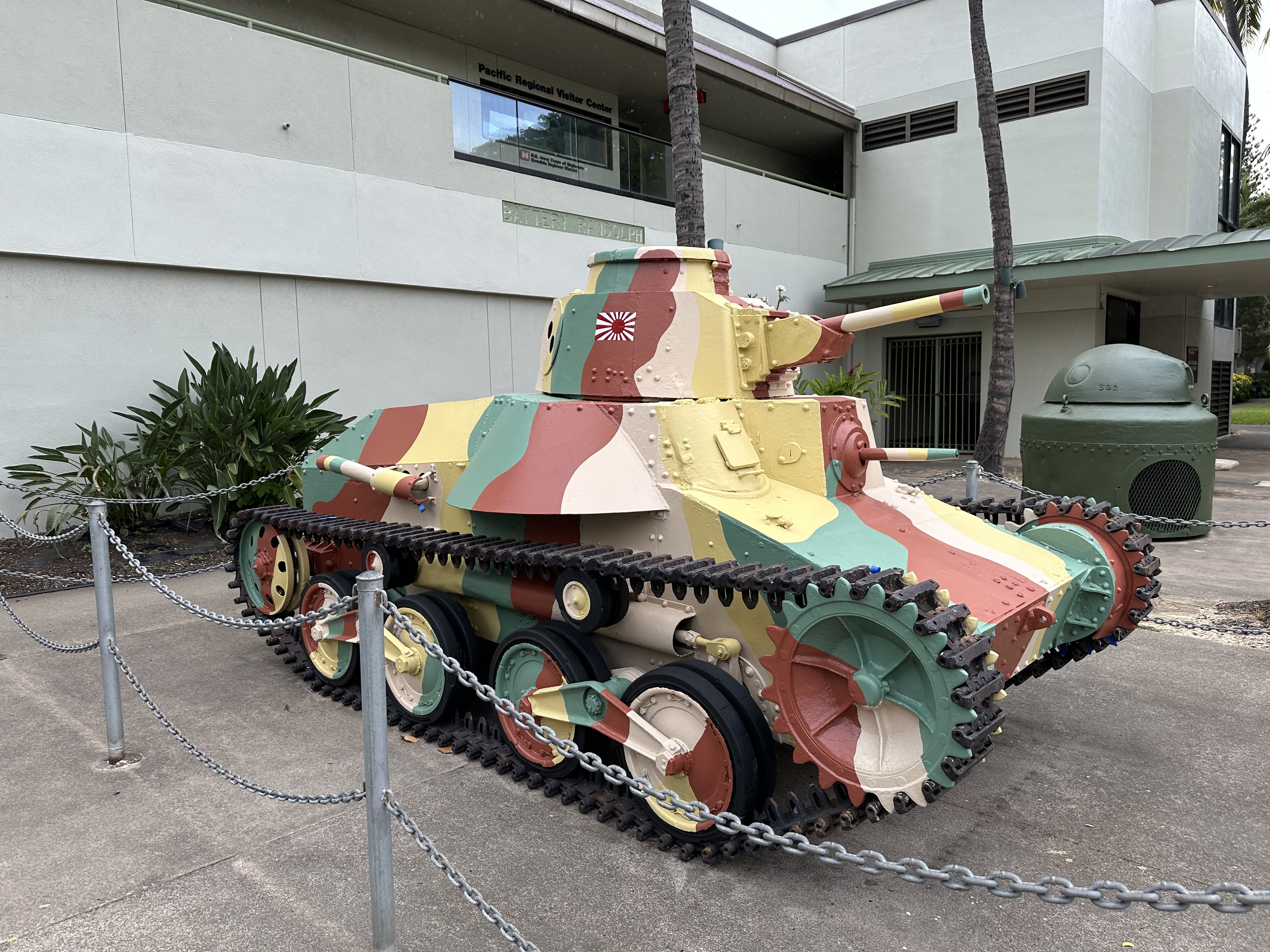
The Japanese Type 95 Ha-Go Light Tank located at the US Army Museum of Hawai'i.

Museum exhibits cover the military history of pre-Imperial Hawaii and the post-annexation history of the US Army and warfare in the Pacific hemisphere, including World War II, the Vietnam War, and the Korean War. The museum also includes a "Gallery of Heroes" honoring recipients of the Medal of Honor and the Distinguished Service Cross (United States) or its equivalents, the Navy Cross and Air Force Cross (United States).

The museum shares space with the Regional Visitor Center of the US Army Corps of Engineers Pacific Division, which exhibits information about key Army Corps projects in Hawaii and the Pacific region. The museum is maintained by the United States Army Center of Military History and the US Army Garrison in Hawai’i.

Admission is free, and the museum is open 10 am to 5 pm, Tuesday through Saturday, excluding Tuesdays that follow a Federal Holiday. It is located in beautiful Honolulu (Waikiki), Hawaii, at 2131 Kalia Road, Honolulu, Hawaii, adjacent to the Hale Koa Hotel. Parking is located across the street.

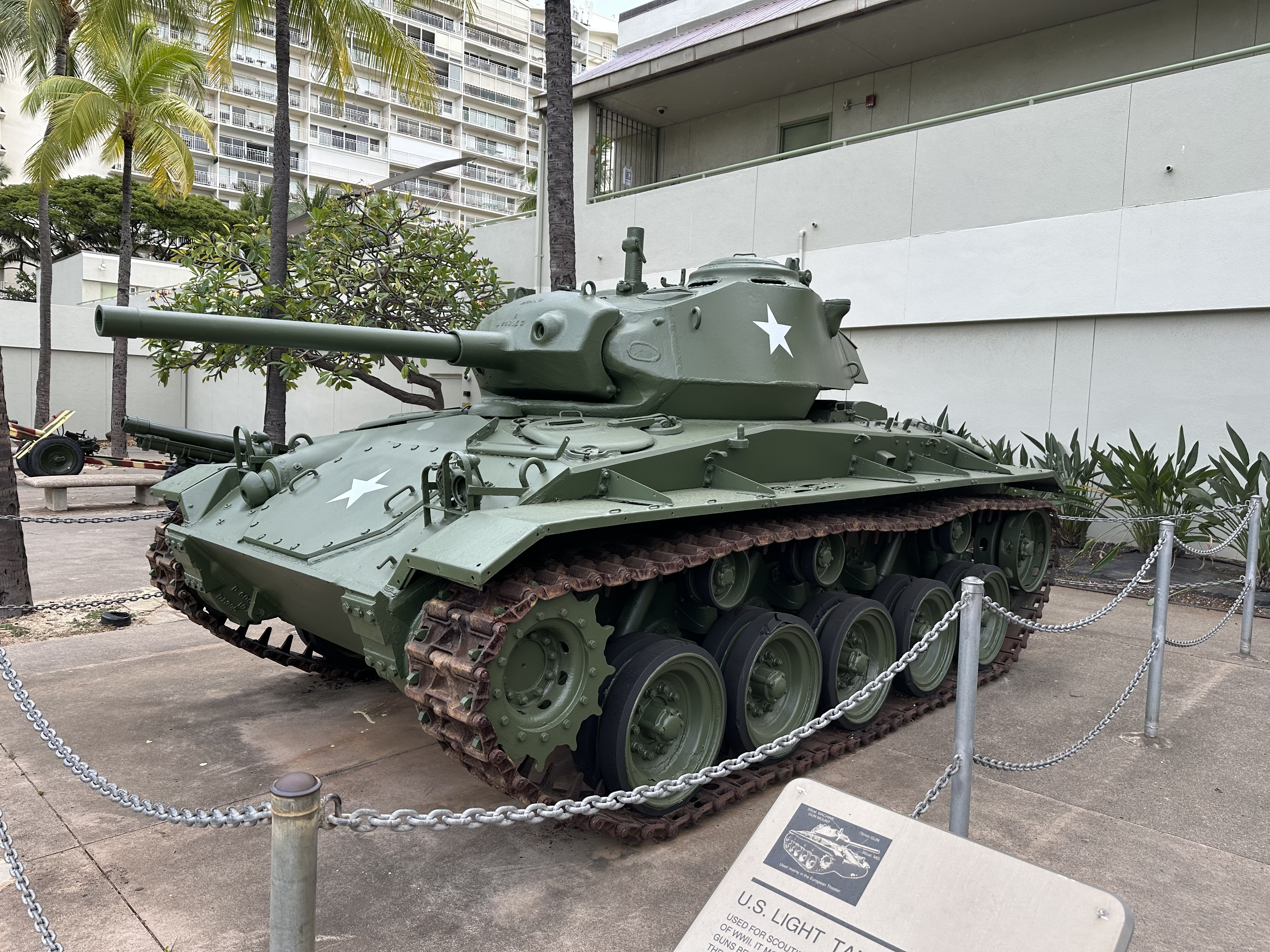
US M24 Chaffee on display at the US Army Museum of Hawaii.

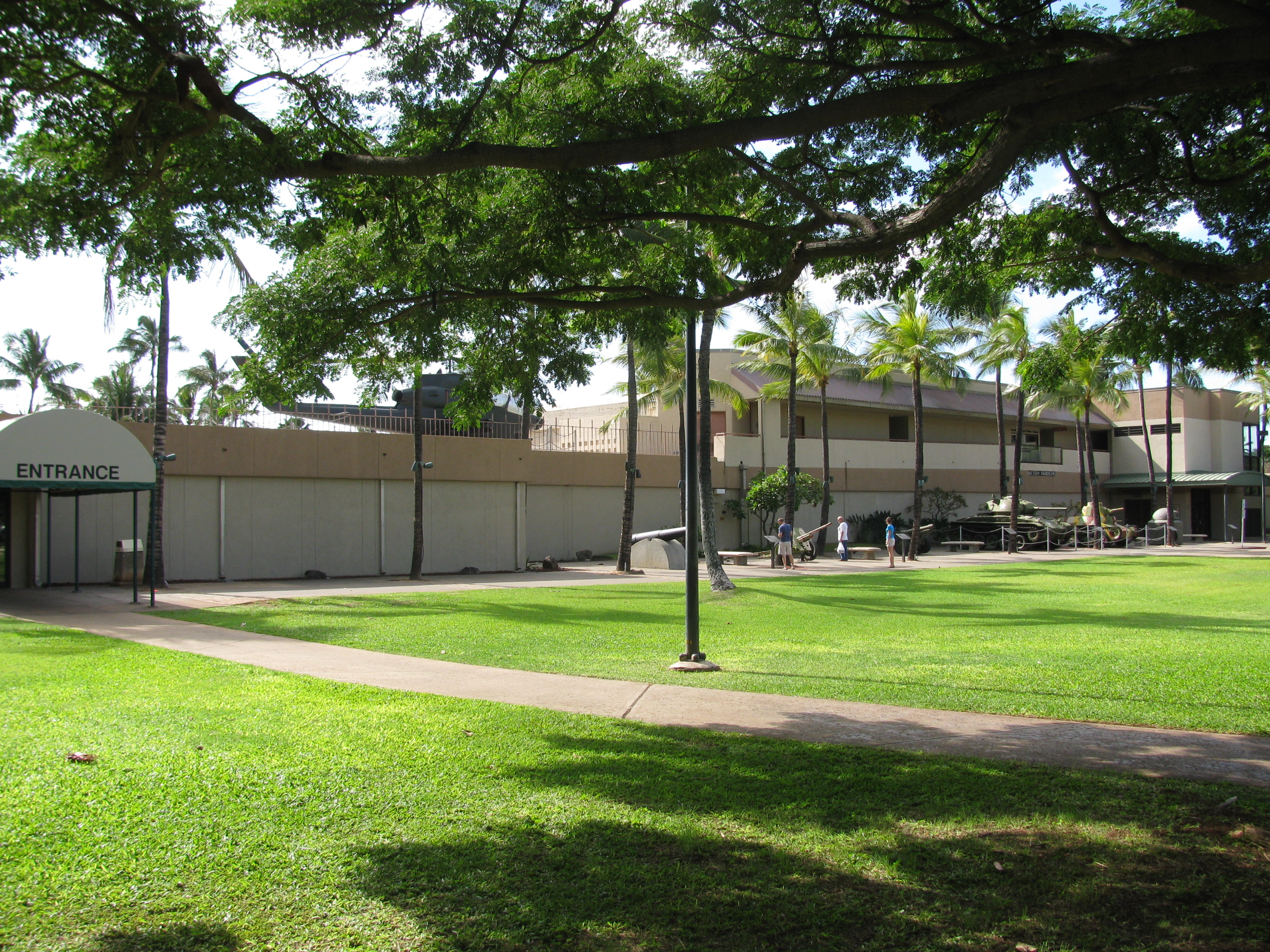
The museum front

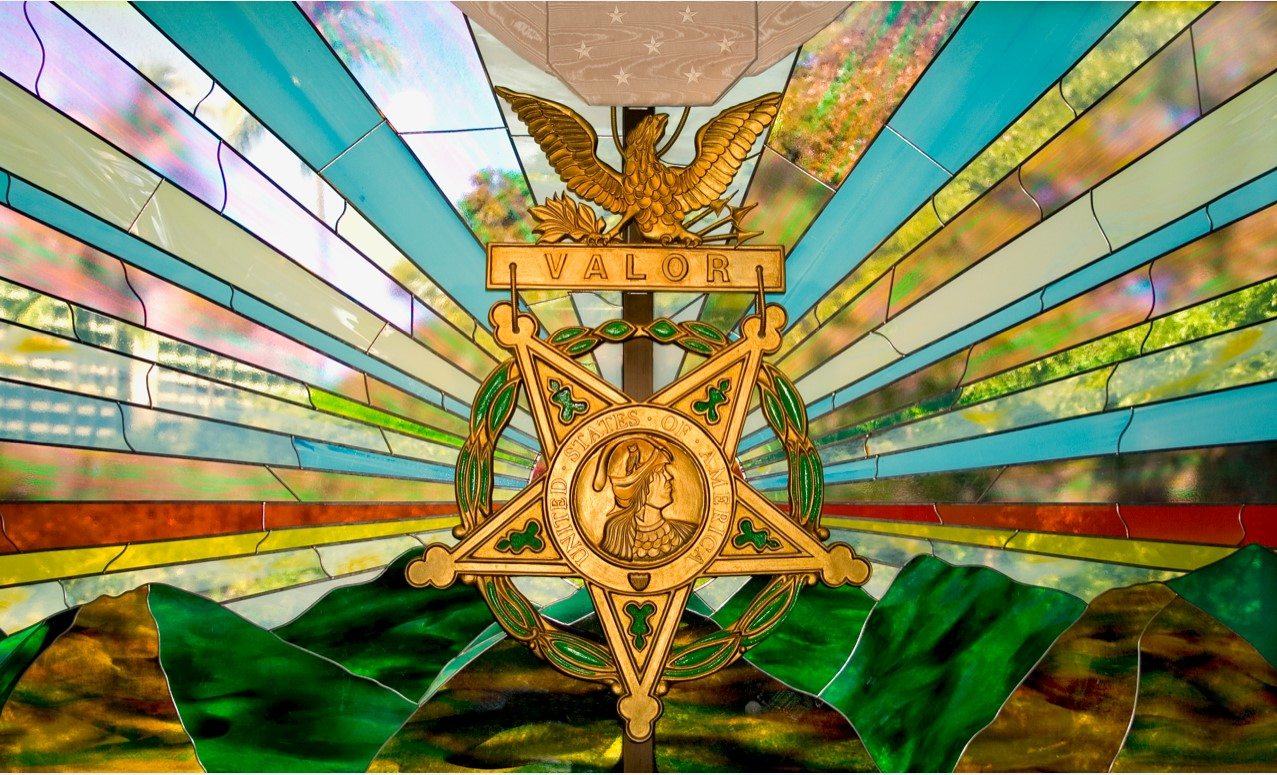
Stained glass window for the Gallery of Heroes .

== See also ==
- 15th Coast Artillery (United States)
- 16th Coast Artillery (United States)
- Airborne & Special Operations Museum
- Board of Fortifications
- Coastal artillery
- Fort Armstrong (Hawaii)
- Fort Casey (Washington State)
- Fort Flagler State Park (Washington State)
- Fort Kamehameha (Hawaii)
- Fort Ruger (Hawaii)
- Fort Worden (Washington State)
- List of coastal fortifications of the United States
- National Infantry Museum
- National Museum of the United States Army
- Puget Sound Coast Artillery Museum
- Ring of Steel (Oahu Hawaii)
- Tropic Lightning Museum (Hawaii)
- United States Army Center of Military History
- United States Army Coast Artillery Corps
