= Harry L. Steele =

United States Army general

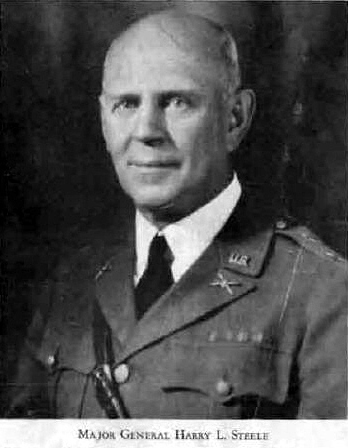
- Coast Artillery Journal, March/April 1935
- Born: June 28, 1874; Springdale, Arkansas, U.S.
- Died: March 31, 1938 (aged 63); San Diego, California, U.S.
- Burial place: Arlington National Cemetery
- Spouse: Cornelia Elizabeth Lundeen (m. 1901-1938, his death)
- Children: 4
- Military career
- Allegiance: United States of America
- Branch: United States Army
- Service years: 1895–1936
- Rank: Major General
- Unit: U.S. Army Coast Artillery Corps
- Commands: 93rd Coast Artillery Company; 111th Coast Artillery Company; 82nd Coast Artillery Company; Fort Mott; Los Angeles Quartermaster Depot; Fort MacArthur; Fort Miley; 31st Coast Artillery Brigade; Coast Defenses of Balboa; 16th Coast Artillery Regiment; Coast Defenses of Honolulu; Chief of Coast Artillery
- Conflicts: Spanish–American War; World War I
- Other work: President, Coast Artillery Association

Harry Lee Steele (June 28, 1874 – March 31, 1938) was a career officer in the United States Army. Enlisting as a private in 1895, he received his commission in 1898. A veteran of the Spanish–American War and World War I, Steele attained the rank of major general and was most notable for his service as the Army's Chief of Coast Artillery from 1935 to 1936.

== Early life ==
Harry Lee Steele was born in Springdale, Arkansas on June 28, 1874, the son of John Bell Steele and Mary (Van Winkle) Steele. He was educated in the schools of Washington and Benton Counties, and graduated from the academy in Rogers in 1894.

Steele joined the United States Army as a private on August 27, 1895. He served in Battery A, 5th Artillery Regiment and attained the rank of sergeant. Rogers competed for an army commission in 1898; he performed well on the examination and was appointed a second lieutenant in the 7th Artillery Regiment.

== Start of career ==
After receiving his commission, Steele was assigned to Spanish–American War recruiting duty in Syracuse, New York. He subsequently joined his regiment at Fort Greble, Rhode Island. Steele was promoted to first lieutenant in February, 1901 and captain in September, 1901. After service at Fort Monroe, Virginia's Artillery School, in 1903 he was assigned to Fort Stevens, Oregon. Steele earned a reputation for superior small arms marksmanship; at an August 1906 Army-wide contest, he placed first in the rifle competition.

In 1906, Steele was assigned to command the 93rd Coast Artillery Company at Fort Stevens. In 1907, Steele relinquished command of the 93rd Coast Artillery Company and was assigned to command the 111th Coast Artillery Company at Fort Dade, Florida. He later commanded the 82nd Coast Artillery Company, which was based at Fort Mansfield, Rhode Island. From 1911 to 1914, Steele served on the staff of the Eastern Coast Artillery District, where his duties included oversight of construction projects at Fort Totten, New York.

In 1914, Steele was promoted to major and assigned to command Fort Mott, New Jersey. He was assigned to temporary Quartermaster Corps duty in 1915 and appointed to the staff of the Philippine Department. In 1917 he carried out temporary Quartermaster duties with the Army garrison in Tientsin (now Tianjin), China. Later in 1917 he returned to the United States and was assigned to duty in California as commander the Los Angeles Quartermaster Depot.

== World War I ==
During World War I, Steele was promoted to temporary lieutenant colonel and temporary colonel and commanded first Fort MacArthur, and later Fort Miley, both in California. In June 1919, Steele was appointed to command the 31st Coast Artillery Brigade with headquarters at Fort Winfield Scott, California. Later in 1919, Steele returned to his permanent rank of major and was assigned to the staff of the Panama Coast Artillery District.

== Post-World War I ==
In 1920, Steele received promotions to permanent lieutenant colonel and colonel. From 1920 to 1922 he was commander of the Coast Defenses of Balboa, Panama. In 1922, Steele left Panama for assignment to the staff of the 1st Coast Artillery District, which was based in Boston, Massachusetts.

From 1927 to 1928, Steele attended the United States Army War College. After graduation he was assigned as chief of organization and training in the Office of the Chief of Coast Artillery, and he later served as the Chief's executive officer. From 1931 to 1934, Steele was commander of the 16th Coast Artillery Regiment and the Coast Defenses of Honolulu, with headquarters at Fort Ruger. In 1934, he was named assistant commandant of the Artillery School at Fort Monroe, Virginia.

In January 1935, Steele was appointed as the Army's Chief of Coast Artillery, succeeding William F. Hase, and was promoted to major general. He served until March 1936, when he retired and was succeeded by Archibald H. Sunderland.

== Later life ==
After retiring from the Army, Steele resided in San Diego, California and served as president of the Coast Artillery Association. He died in San Diego on March 31, 1938. Steele was buried at Arlington National Cemetery.

== Legacy ==
Battery Steele, a Coast Artillery emplacement that defended Casco Bay, Maine, was named for Steele. It was constructed in 1942 and operated until it was decommissioned in 1946. After years of abandonment, in 1995 the Peaks Island Land Preserve was formed to purchase the area and maintain it as a public space. In 2005, Battery Steele was listed on the National Register of Historic Places.

== Family ==
On December 25, 1901, Steele married Cornelia Elizabeth Lundeen (1880-1976), the daughter of Colonel John A. Lundeen and Mary (Culter) Lundeen. They were the parents of four children: Lee, John, Lundeen, and Ruth.
