= Fort Armstrong (Hawaii) =

Former US Army Coast Artillery Fort in Oahu, Hawaii

- Part of United States Army Coast Artillery Corps
- Honolulu, Oahu, Hawaii

Site information
- Type: Coastal artillery fort
- Condition: Abandoned; now part of container port

Site history
- Built: 1907
- Built by: United States Army Corps of Engineers
- In use: 1907–1950

Garrison information
- Garrison: 1st Coast Artillery Company, 104th Mine Company, 185th Coast Artillery Company

Fort Armstrong, Hawaii was a Coast Artillery Fort built in 1907 and named after Brigadier General Samuel C. Armstrong. The U.S. Army Corps of Engineers were still at the fort until 1974.

== History ==
Fort Armstrong is located at Honolulu, Oahu and was built on landfill over Ku-akau-kukui reef in 1907 to protect Honolulu harbor. It featured one named battery, and was spread over 64 acres.

- Battery Tiernon with two pedestal mounted 3-inch M1903 guns from 1911 to 1943.

The original garrison was the 1st Coast artillery Company followed by the 104th Mine Co. operating the harbor mines. Also stationed there was the 185th Coast Artillery Company. Fort Armstrong continued under the occupation of the Coast Artillery until September 15, 1922, when the Coast Artillery Headquarters moved to Fort DeRussy. It was abandoned by the U.S. Army by 1950 and is now part of a container port facility.

== See also ==
- U.S. Army Coast Artillery Corps
- Mine Planter Service (U.S. Army)
- 16th Coast Artillery (United States)
