= Fort Kamehameha =

- Battery Jackson; Battery Selfridge; Battery Hasbrouck; Battery Hawkins; Hawkins annex
- U.S. National Register of Historic Places
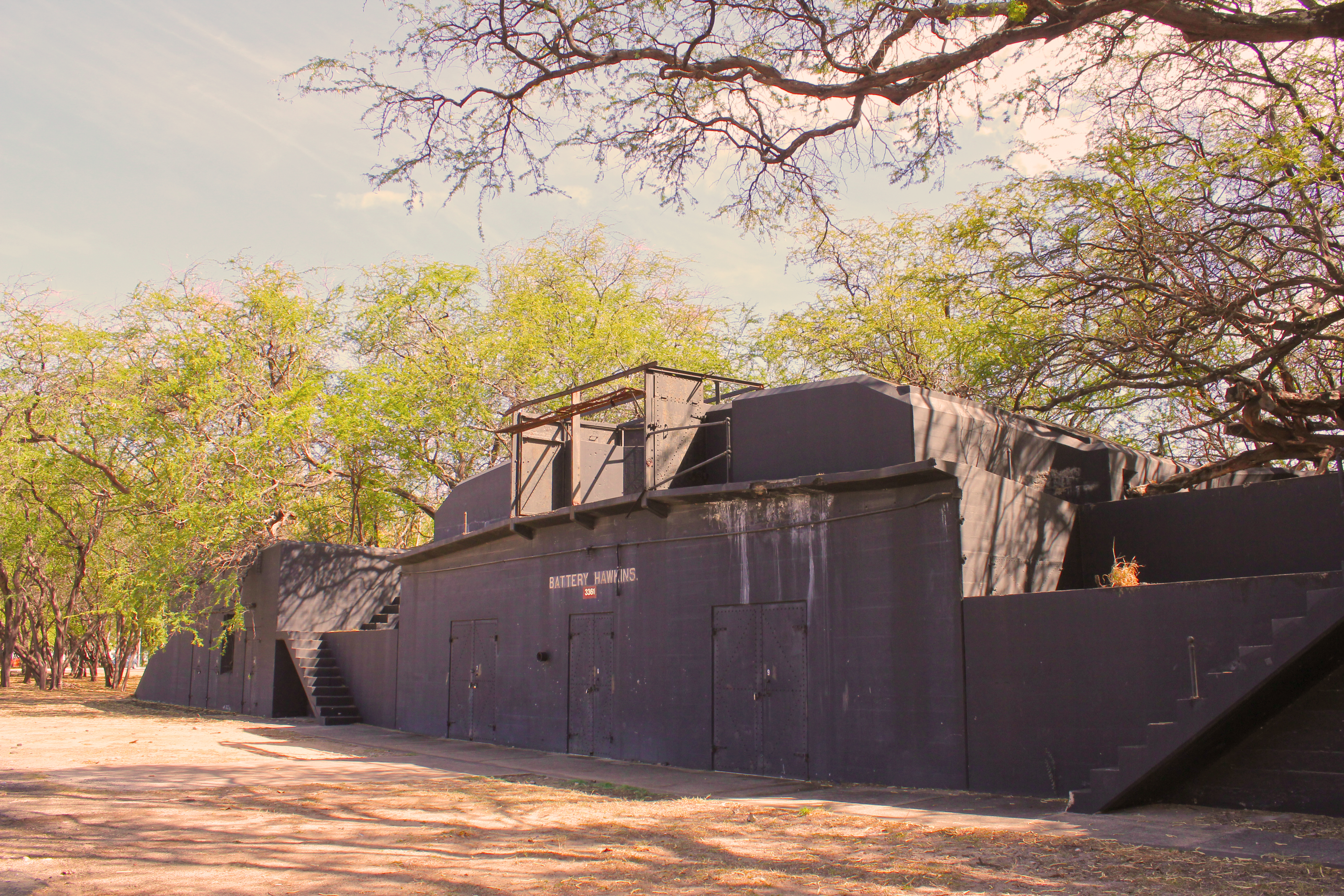
- Battery Hawkins

- Location within Oahu Location within Hawaii
- Location: Honolulu, Hawaii
- Coordinates: 21°19′24″N 157°57′34″W
- Built: 1913–1915
- MPS: Artillery District of Honolulu Thematic Resource
- NRHP reference No.: 84000954; 84000975; 84000925; 84000928; 84000948
- Added to NRHP: June 5, 1984

Fort Kamehameha was a United States Army military base that was the site of several coastal artillery batteries to defend Pearl Harbor starting in 1907 in Honolulu, Hawaii.

== History ==
The eastern areas of the fort were in the district called Moanalua. It was royal land won by conquest by Kamehameha I in the 1790s and eventually passed to Bernice Pauahi Bishop (named "Bishop's Point") and then inherited by Samuel Mills Damon in 1884. The western side known as Halawa, was the former beach-front estate of Queen Emma of Hawaii. The sandy dunes had been used as a burial site. It was used for the U.S. Army in 1901, and acquired by the U.S. federal government in 1907 by condemnation from Emma's estate. It was sometimes called "Queen Emma Military Reservation" or "Queen Emma Point".

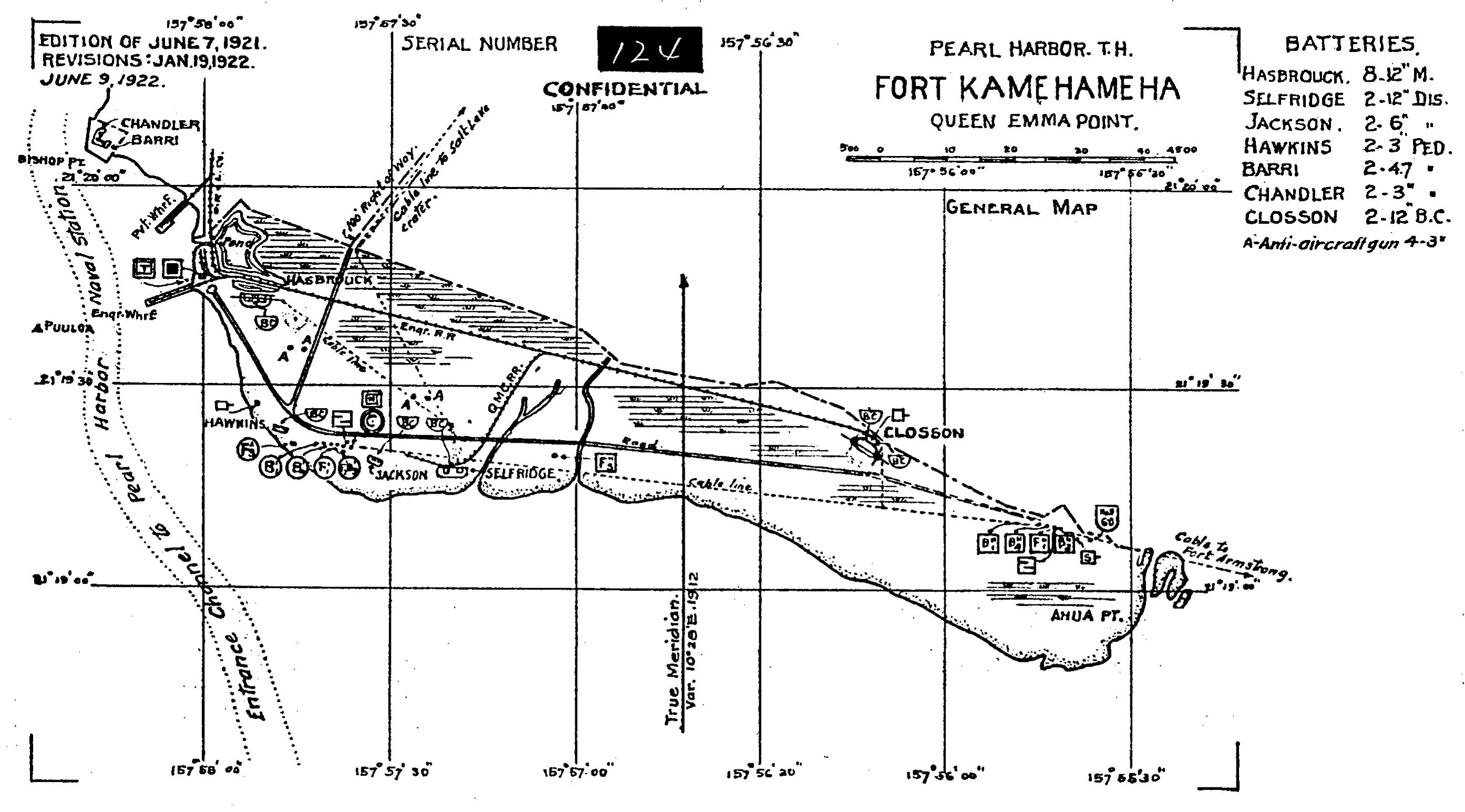
Map from 1922 of Fort Kamehameha

Secretary of War William Howard Taft under President Theodore Roosevelt headed a group to review coastal defenses, in light of "possessions" such as Hawaii and the Philippines, based on the findings of the Board of Fortifications. Originally named Fort Upton for General Emory Upton (1839–1881), on January 28, 1909 after local citizens objected, Archibald Cleghorn suggested the name be changed to honor Kamehameha I, the first king of the unified Hawaiian Islands.

In addition to armaments, a row of officers' houses would be built in 1916, and a chapel added in 1940.

== First phase (1907-1920) ==
Batteries were placed behind massive reinforced concrete walls about 20 feet (6.1 m) thick, which were in turn behind 30 feet (9.1 m) of earth. From east to west the sites built in the first phase were:

=== Battery Selfridge ===
Battery Selfridge was constructed from November 1907 to 1913 with two 12-inch M1895 guns on disappearing carriages, with a range of about 30,000 yards (27 km). It was fort building 420, NRHP site 84000975, located at 21°19′5″N 157°57′9″W. It was named for Lt. Thomas Selfridge, the first person to die in an airplane crash.

=== Battery Jackson ===
Battery Jackson, constructed in 1913, was equipped with two 6-inch (152 mm) guns on disappearing carriages, with a range of about 15,000 yards (14 km). It was fort building 430, about 1.1 acres (4,500 m^{2}), state site 80-13-1601 and NRHP site 84000954, 21°19′6″N 157°57′22″W. It was named for American Civil War Brigadier General Richard Henry Jackson. A massive concrete air raid shelter was built in 1915.

=== Battery Hawkins ===
Battery Hawkins was constructed in 1914 with two 3-inch (76 mm) guns with a range of about 6,000 yards (5.5 km). It was fort building 440, NRHP site 84000928 located at 21°19′12″N 157°57′36″W, 440 Nelson Avenue. Another bunker built here was known as Hawkins annex, fort building 450, NRHP site 84000948, state site 80-13-1603. Although the smallest of the batteries, it is the easiest to access. It was named for General Hamilton Smith Hawkins (1834–1910).

=== Battery Hasbrouck ===
Battery Hasbrouck (sometimes misspelled as "Hasebrock") was constructed from July 1909 to 1914 and was equipped with eight 12-inch coast defense mortars, with a range of about 15,000 yards (14 km). It was fort building 460 and NRHP site 84000925. It was directly east of the entrance to Pearl Harbor, designed to protect its mine field, at coordinates 21°19′30″N 157°57′40″W, covering 2.6 acres (11,000 m^{2}). It was named for General Henry Cornelius Hasbrouck (1839–1910) son of William C. Hasbrouck.

=== Battery Chandler and Barri ===
At the west end of Fort Kamehameha, coordinates 21°19′53″N 157°58′6″W Battery Chandler had two 3-inch (76 mm) guns named for Lt. Rex Chandler who died in an airplane crash in 1913. Battery Barri had two 4.7-inch (120 mm) guns, was named for Captain Thomas O. Barri who died in the Civil War in 1863. Construction on these was started in September 1914. Barri was dismantled in 1925 and both no longer exist.

=== Batteries Adair and Boyd ===
Each of these had two 6-inch (152 mm) Armstrong guns in casemates located on Ford Island. They were constructed starting in August 1916 and named for Lt Henry R. Adair (died 1916) and Captain Charles T. Boyd (died 1916). A few years later an airfield called Luke Field was built on Ford Island, and the site is now owned by the Navy.

== Battery Closson (1920-1945) ==
Within a few years the armaments of the first phase were obsolete. In 1920, two 12-inch (305 mm) M1895 guns on a new style M1917 barbette carriage that could traverse a full 360 degrees were installed and named after Civil War artillery specialist, General Henry W. Closson. This design had a 975-pound (442 kg) projectile with elevation up to 35 degrees and range of 17 miles (27 km). It was located about 21°19′9″N 157°56′3″W. Anti-aircraft guns were also added to protect from attack from above. In 1942, concrete shielding was added above the guns.

== Use ==
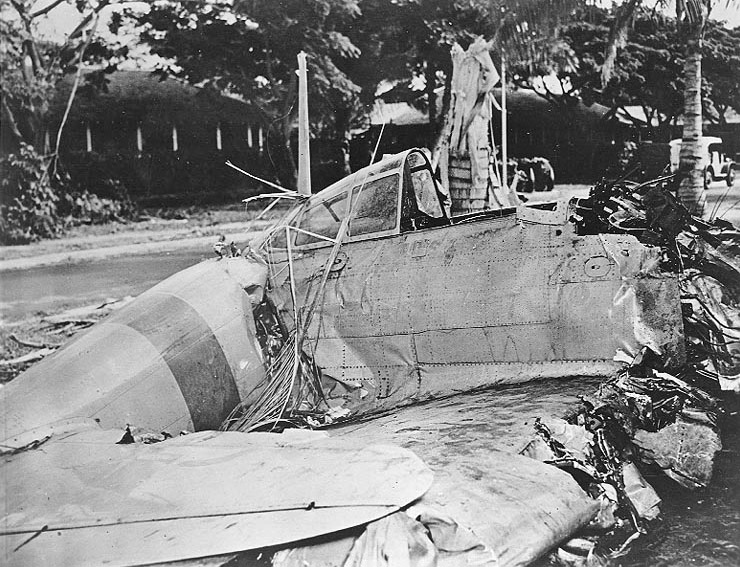
Cockpit of the "Zero" shot down in 1941 Pearl Harbor attack

During World War II, some of the anti-aircraft guns were used in the attack on Pearl Harbor on December 7, 1941. A Japanese Mitsubishi A6M2 model 21 "Zero" was strafing US military personnel when the pilot failed to pull up in time and bounced off the ground, severely damaging the propeller. The pilot was killed instantly when it crashed near the fort.

At the end of World War II, the coastal batteries had become obsolete, and most of the military installations at the Fort were subsequently demolished.

== Preservation ==
None of the large caliber guns were ever fired except in practice about once a year. They were salvaged after the war. Some other sites within the fort besides the ones listed above were destroyed. The area around Selfridge and Jackson batteries are now used for the Hawaii Air National Guard. The eastern side of the military reservation (where Battery Closson was located) became the Mamala Bay Golf Course. The "Artillery District of Honolulu" (state historic site 80-13-1382) was added to the National Register of Historic Places listings in Oahu on June 5, 1984.

Fort DeRussy Military Reservation Battery Randolf (which now houses a museum) was also included in the preservation effort.

In the 1970s the Fort Kamehameha Wastewater Treatment Plant was built on the western end of the fort. On October 1, 1992 its 506 acres (205 ha) became part of Hickam Air Force Base. The residents were forced out of the homes by the U.S. Air Force and the historic homes were abandoned in 2008 since they were near the runway of Honolulu International Airport despite belonging on the National Register of Historic Places.

== See also ==
- U.S. Army Coast Artillery Corps
- 41st Field Artillery Regiment (United States)
- 15th Coast Artillery (United States)
