= 64th Coast Artillery (United States) =

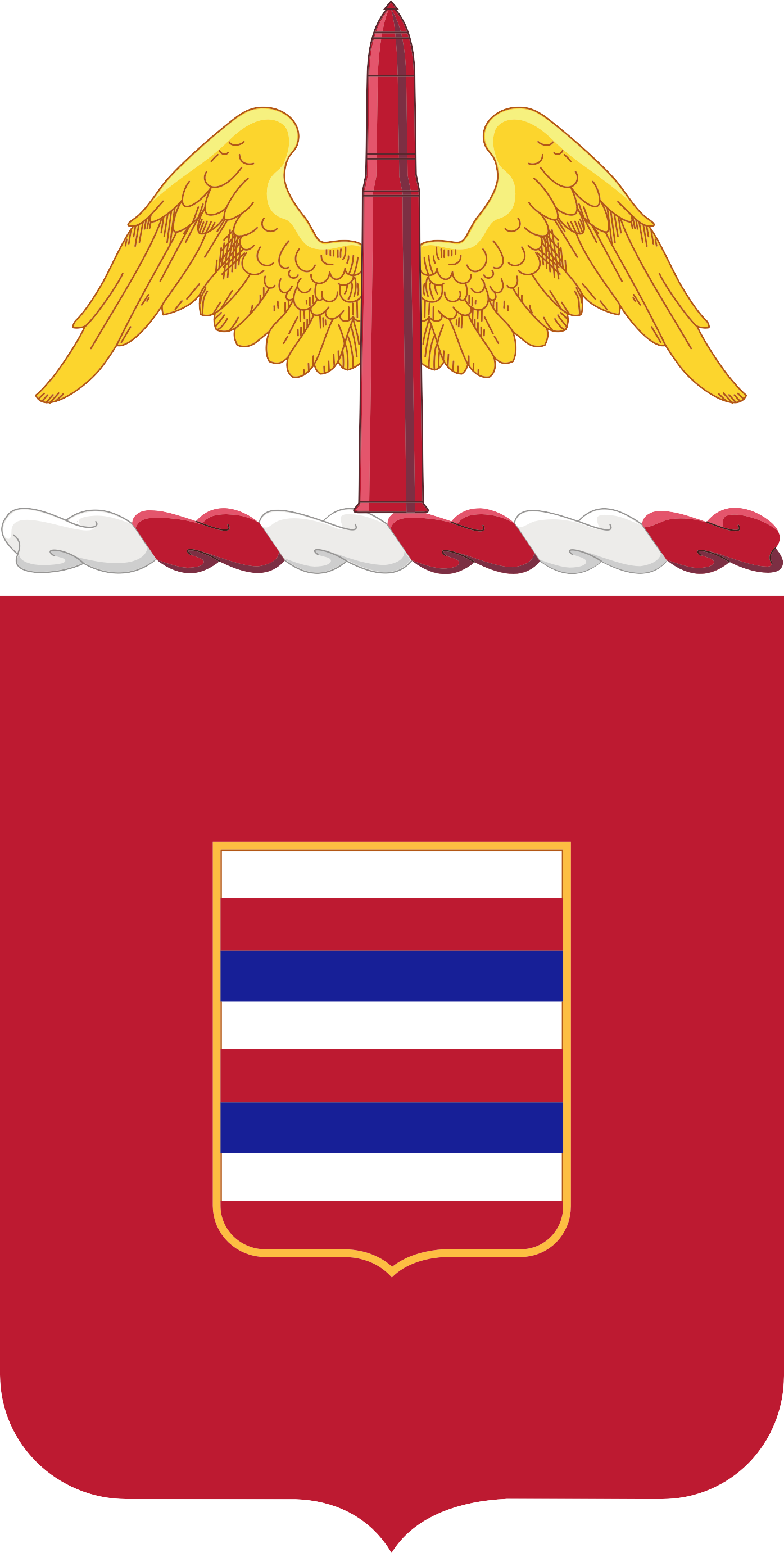
- coat of arms
- Active: 1918-1957
- Country: United States
- Branch: Army
- Type: Coast artillery
- Role: Anti-aircraft
- Size: Regiment
- Motto: "We Aim High"
- Mascot: Oozlefinch
- Engagements: World War I World War II

The 64th Coast Artillery was a Coast Artillery regiment in the United States Army.

== History ==
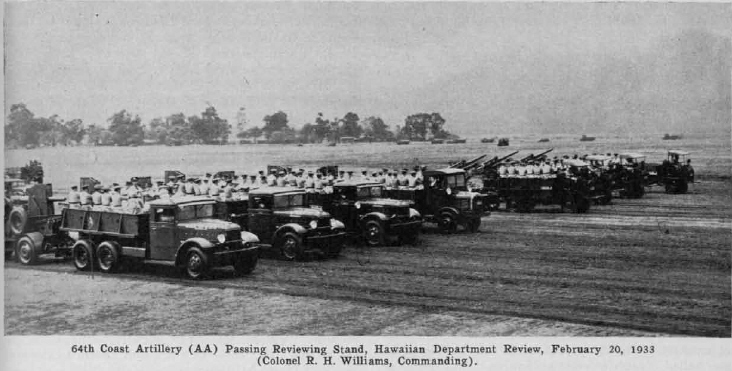
1931 GMC model T95 8-ton trucks towing 3 inch AA guns of the 64th Coast Artillery

== Lineage ==
Constituted as 64th Artillery (CAC) on 15 January 1918 and organized 17 May 1918 as follows:

- HHC at Fort Barrancas
- A Battery at Fort Screven
- B Battery at Fort Dade
- C Battery at Fort Barrancas
- D Battery at Jackson Barracks
- E Battery at Jackson Barracks
- F Battery at Fort Crockett
- Supply Battery Fort Crockett

Staged at Camp Upton assigned to 34th Brigade (CAC), arrived in France 6 September 1918. Departed France 10 February 1919. Demobilized at Camp Eustis 1 April 1919.

Hawaiian AA Regiment constituted 2 May 1921 and organized 3 June 1921 at Fort Ruger with personnel from companies of Coast Artillery Oahu. as follows:

- HHB, HHD&CT
- Gun Battalion HHB
- A Battery
- B Battery
- C Battery
- D Battery (SL)
- Machine Gun Battalion HHB
- E Battery
- F Battery
- G Battery
- H Battery (SL)

Regiment moved to Fort Shafter 27 January 1922 searchlight batteries switched with A, and D batteries.

- Redesignated 64th Artillery (AA) (CAC) 2 June 1922
- Redesignated 64th Coast Artillery (AA) Regiment 1 July 1924

Reorganized 1 November 1925 with 3 battalions as follows:

- HHB and Service Battery
- 1st BN HHB
  - A Battery
  - B Battery
  - C Battery
- 2nd BN HHB
  - D Battery
  - E Battery
  - F Battery
- 3rd BN HHB
  - G Battery
  - H Battery
  - I Battery

Batteries K and L added 1 July 1928, also a Band.

- Battery F assigned to Baker Island 1 August 1943, redesignated Battery D, 751st Coast Artillery (AA) Battalion (Sep).

Inactivated 12 December 1943 and broken up as follows:

- HHB redesignated 136th AAA Group
- 1st Battalion redesignated 64th AAA (Gun) Battalion
- 2nd Battalion (less Battery F) redesignated 750th AAA (Gun) Battalion
- 3rd Battalion redesignated 864th AAA (AW) Battalion

64th AAA (Gun) Battalion assigned to Guam 10 September 1944. Inactivated 30 May 1946. Reactivated 11 April 1949 at Atsugi, Honshu, Japan.

- Redesignated 17 December 1954 as the 64th Antiaircraft Artillery Battalion.

Inactivated 25 September 1957 in Japan.

== Distinctive unit insignia ==
- Description

A round of Antiaircraft Artillery ammunition Gules winged Or. The insignia is 1 inch (2.54 cm) in height.

- Symbolism

The winged antiaircraft artillery projectiles represent the mission of the organization.

- Background

The distinctive unit insignia was originally approved for the 64th Artillery Regiment, Coast Artillery Corps on 25 July 1922. It was amended to correct the description on 10 January 1923. It was amended to specify how it was worn on 5 November 1931. The insignia was redesignated for the 64th Antiaircraft Artillery Battalion on 18 November 1955.

== Coat of arms ==
=== Blazon ===
- Shield

Gules, an inescutcheon barry of eight Argent, of the field and Azure repeated.

- Crest

On a wreath of the colors Argent and Gules, a round of Antiaircraft Artillery ammunition Gules winged Or.

- Motto

We Aim High

=== Symbolism ===
- Shield

The shield is scarlet for Artillery and bears an inescutcheon, the first quarter of the Royal Hawaiian coat of arms.

- Crest

The winged antiaircraft artillery projectiles represent the mission of the organization.

=== Background ===
The coat of arms was originally approved for the Hawaiian Antiaircraft Artillery Regiment, Coast Artillery Corps on 8 March 1922. It was redesignated for the 64th Regiment, Coast Artillery Corps on 10 June 1922. It was redesignated for the 64th Antiaircraft Artillery Gun Battalion on 5 January 1944. The insignia was redesignated for the 64th Antiaircraft Artillery Battalion on 18 November 1955.

== Current units ==
Not active

== Campaign streamers ==
World War I

- Streamer without inscription

World War II

- Central Pacific
- Western Pacific

== Decorations ==
None
