= Hale Koa Hotel =

Armed Forces Recreation Center (AFRC) resort in Hawaii

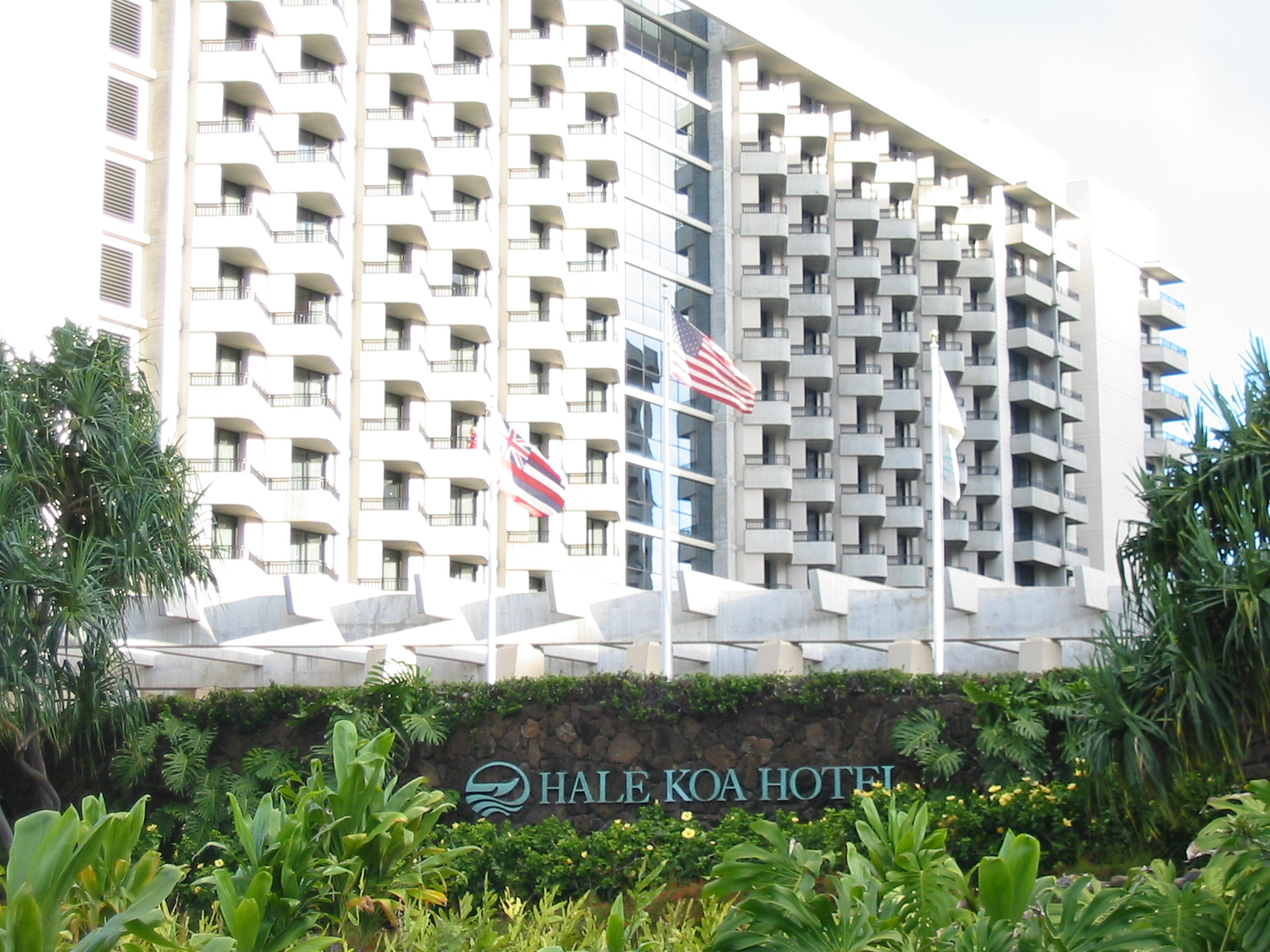
- Entrance to the Hale Koa Hotel pictured in 2006
- Interactive map of the Hale Koa Hotel area

General information
- Location: Waikiki, Honolulu, Hawaii
- Coordinates: 21°16′54″N 157°50′05″W
- Opening: October 25, 1975
- Owner: United States Department of Defense
- Operator: Armed Forces Recreation Centers

Technical details
- Floor count: 14

Other information
- Number of rooms: 817
- Number of restaurants: 2

Website
- www.halekoa.com

The Hale Koa Hotel, which means House of the Warrior in Hawaiian, is an Armed Forces Recreation Center (AFRC) resort hotel located on Waikiki Beach and owned by the United States Department of Defense. It sits on the southeast corner of Fort DeRussy on the western end of Waikiki in Honolulu, Hawaii. The hotel has more than one million guests every year, all of whom require the United States Uniformed Services Privilege and Identification Card to lodge at the hotel. Though owned by the DoD, the hotel is entirely self-sustaining, and does not receive any government funding.

== History ==
The hotel was originally planned to be built on the site of Battery Randolph (now the Army Museum) in the early 1970s, but the battery proved to be too resilient to demolish. The hotel opened at Waikiki beach on October 25, 1975, with a traditional Hawaiian ceremony. A major expansion came in 1991. The hotel added a new pool, a beverage bar, and a luau garden. Later, the Maile tower was built across the lobby from the Ilima tower, bringing the total number of rooms to 818. Also constructed was an adults-only pool, a fitness center, a parking garage, and Bibas, a new café located on a porch underneath the Maile tower. The Ilima Tower was fully renovated in 2010. In 2019, the Maile Tower underwent a $40 million interior renovation awarded to Haskell, and a new ocean-side pool complex replaced the hotel's original pool.

== Dining ==
There are several dining facilities on the hotel's beachfront property:

- Bibas Courtyard Grill
- Koko at Kalia
- Java Café
- Happy's Fast & Fresh Snack Bar
- Koa Oasis
- Warrior's Lounge (closed)
- Pool Snack Bar
- Barefoot Bar
- Sunday Champagne Brunch in the Banyan Tree Room (closed)
- Beach Cart
- Coffee Cart

== Eligible guests ==
Because Hale Koa Hotel is an AFRC resort, it is not open to the general public. Reservations may only be made by:

- Current active duty members of the Uniformed Services of the United States.
- Current Reserve and National Guard members.
- Retired from active duty, Reserves, and National Guard with or without pay (gray area).
- Honorably discharged veterans with a service-connected disability certified by the Department of Veterans Affairs (VA).
- Recipients of the Medal of Honor.
- Current and retired Department of Defense (DoD) and Coast Guard (CG) civilian employees.

The Survivors' Family Program extends to family members and sponsored guests accompanying authorized users. Eligible users are defined as family members who have suffered a loss of a sponsor in the event of an active duty death regardless of the cause (combat, accident, suicide, illness, etc.) and also may be uniformed personnel.
