= Richard Henry Jackson =

Richard H. Jackson
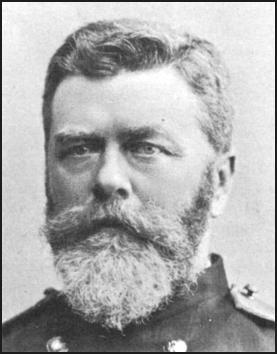
- Born: July 14, 1830; Kinnegad, County Westmeath, Ireland
- Died: November 28, 1892 (aged 62); Fort McPherson, Atlanta, Georgia, U.S.
- Military career
- Allegiance: Union; United States
- Branch: Union Army; U.S. Army
- Rank: Brigadier General; Bvt. Major General
- Wars: American Civil War; Battle of Drewry's Bluff; Battle of Newmarket Heights

Richard Henry Jackson (1830–1892) was an Irish-born American career soldier. He served in the Union Army in the American Civil War rising to the grade of brigadier general of volunteers and an appointment to the grade of brevet major general of volunteers in 1866.

== Life ==
Richard Henry Jackson was a native of Ireland, born at Kinnegad, Westmeath County, on July 14, 1830. He came to the United States with his parents when he was a boy.

On December 12, 1851 he enlisted in the 4th Regiment of Artillery of the United States Army as a private. At the outbreak of the American Civil War he had risen to the grade of first lieutenant and in February 1862 was promoted to the grade of captain.

He participated in many of the battles in Virginia, receiving brevet commissions for meritorious conduct at the battles of Drewry's Bluff and New Market Heights. The highest grade to which Jackson was promoted during the war was lieutenant colonel and assistant inspector general. He was chief of artillery of the IX Corps of the Union Army for several months in 1864. He was commander of 2nd Division of the XXV Corps during the closing operations of the Army of the Potomac in Virginia. He served with Division 2 of the XXV Corps in the Department of Texas from May 4, 1865 to November 4, 1865.

On January 13, 1866, President Andrew Johnson nominated Jackson for appointment to the grade of brigadier general of volunteers with an appointment date and date of rank of May 19, 1865 and the United States Senate confirmed the appointment on February 23, 1866. Also on January 13, 1866, President Johnson nominated Jackson for appointment to the grade of brevet major general of volunteers with a date of rank of November 24, 1865 and the United States Senate confirmed the appointment on March 12, 1866.

On February 1, 1866, Jackson was mustered out of the volunteer service. He was assigned to his old regiment, reverting to his regular grade of captain. On July 17, 1866, President Johnson nominated Jackson for appointment to the grade of brevet brigadier general in the regular U.S. Army to rank from March 13, 1865 and the United States Senate confirmed the appointment on July 23, 1866. He did not receive an assignment in that grade. He became major of the 5th Regiment of Artillery in July, 1880, and lieutenant colonel of the 4th Regiment of Artillery in December, 1888.

=== Death, burial and legacy ===
He died at 3 p.m. on November 28, 1892 at the barracks of Fort McPherson, Atlanta, Georgia, where he was stationed. General O. O. Howard was at once notified by telegraph.

Funeral services were held at St. Phillips' Protestant Episcopal church in Atlanta, after which, in obedience to his wishes, his remains were taken to West Point military academy for interment. His only child, who died while a cadet at West Point, had also been buried there. His wife died in 1920 and was also interred near him.

Battery Jackson, on Fort Kamehameha, was named for him. It was constructed in 1913 and operational through World War II.

== See also ==
- List of American Civil War generals (Union)
