= Armed Forces Recreation Centers =

American military rest and relaxation facilities

Armed Forces Recreation Centers (AFRCs) are a chain of Joint Service Facility resorts hotels owned by the United States Department of Defense to provide rest and relaxation in the form of lodging and outdoor recreation for United States military service members, US military retirees and other authorized patrons.

== History ==
The AFRC was founded in 1945 and is part of the Family and Morale, Welfare, and Recreation (FMWR) program (previously known as Morale, Welfare and Recreation (MWR). After World War II, the U.S. Army 10th Armoured Division arrived in Garmisch-Partenkirschen, Germany on 30 April 1945. In December that year, a winter sports centre was opened which was renamed in March 1946 to the Armed Forces Recreation Area. That same year, the MWR programs were created.

In 1945, the AFRC took over the Sanno Hotel in Tokyo, Japan which was renovated and reopened in 1947. It was leased to the US military from the Government of Japan.

In 1950 the Armed Forces Recreation Area was opened in Fort DeRussy in Hawaii, which became the Hale Koa Hotel and opened on 25 October 1975. In 1954, the AFRC took over the Von Steuben Hotel, the General Patton Hotel, and the Green Arrow Hotel in Garmisch Germany, as well as the General Walker Hotel in Berchtesgarden, Germany, to use as resort locations The AFRC also commissioned the Lake Hotel in Chiemsee Germany.

In 1983, the New Sanno Hotel was reopened and the old building from 1932 was demolished.

Rates for use of these facilities are determined by rank, with the lowest ranking service-members paying the lowest fees. The facilities are often located in areas where typical hotel and resort rates are very high, thus allowing the members of the military lower cost vacations. Hale Koa Hotel at Fort DeRussy, Hawaii is the only AFRC resort inside a military reservation in the United States.

Army Installation Management Command (IMCOM) G9 directly manages the AFRCs to provide all uniformed services with resort-style facilities.

== Authorized guests ==
- Active duty members and their families of the U.S. Armed Forces.
- Retired members of Active Duty, Reserves, and the National Guard
- Members of the Reserve components of the United States Armed Forces, Reserve and National Guard.
- Retired Reservist and National Guardsmen not yet age 60 (Gray Area).
- Honorably discharged veterans with 100 percent service-connected disability certified by the Department of Veterans Affairs (VA).
- Current civilian and retired employees of the Department of Defense.
- Former and/or Surviving Spouses and Family Members of a Retired member of the Armed Forces or of personnel who died while on active duty.
- Involuntarily separated service members under the Transition Assistance Management Program.
- Personnel separated under the Voluntary Separation Incentive (VSI) and Special Separation Benefit (SSB) programs for two years after separation from service.
- U.S. employees of firms under contract to Department of Defense working in the Pacific Region outside the U.S. on Department of Defense Government orders.
- Military personnel of foreign nations and their family members when assigned or attached to a U.S. military unit or installation or on U.S. Travel Orders.
- Those newly authorised under the Disabled Veterans Equal Access Act of 2018 (only available at Shades of Green and Hale Koa)

== Resorts ==
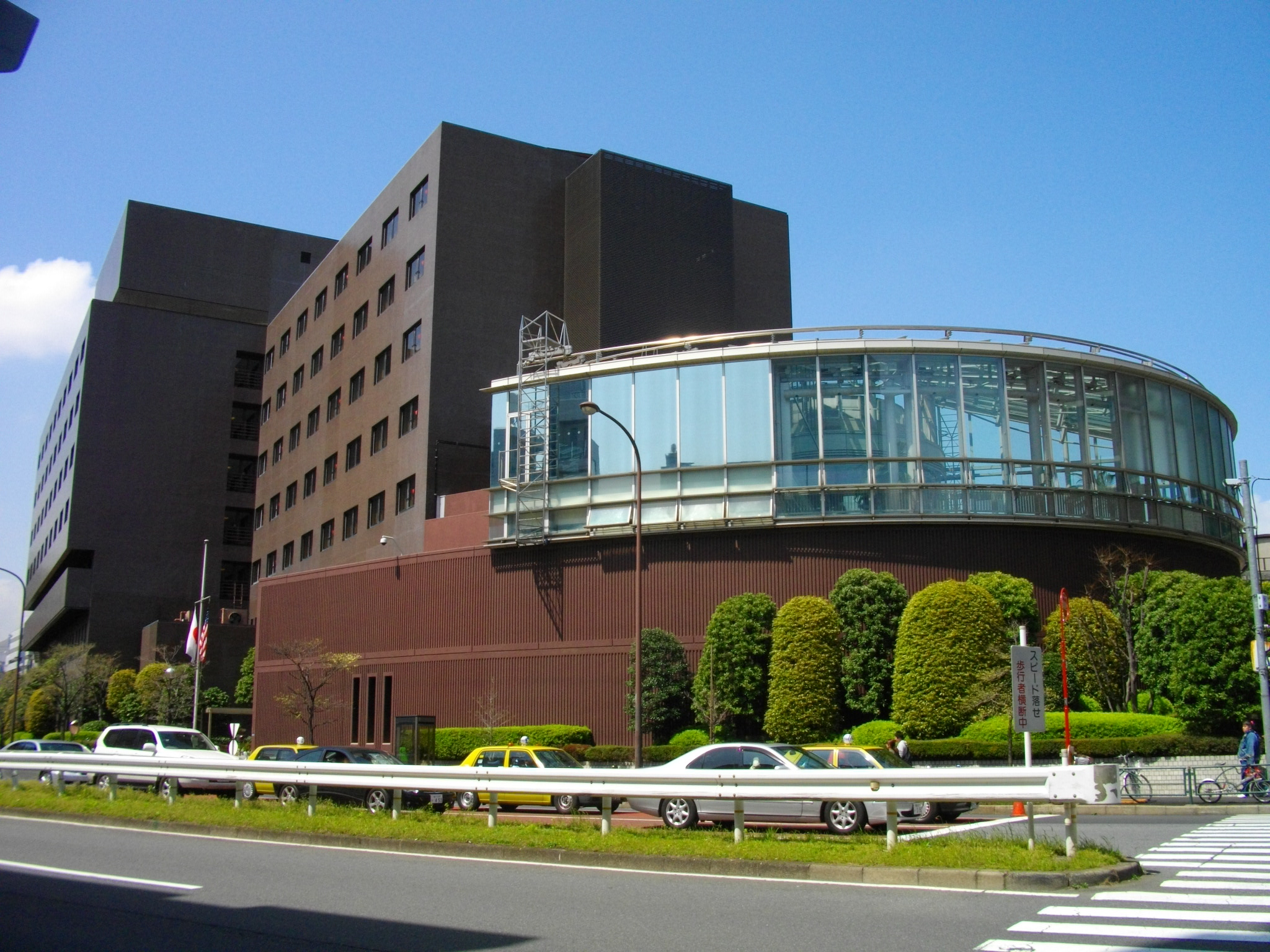
New Sanno Hotel in Minato, Tokyo, Japan

The five resorts include:

- Shades of Green located in Walt Disney World in Orlando, Florida
- Edelweiss Lodge and Resort located in Garmisch-Partenkirchen, Germany
- Dragon Hill Lodge located in Seoul, Korea
- Hale Koa Hotel located on Fort DeRussy, Hawaii
- New Sanno Hotel located in Tokyo, Japan
