= 16th Coast Artillery (United States) =

16th Coast Artillery Regiment
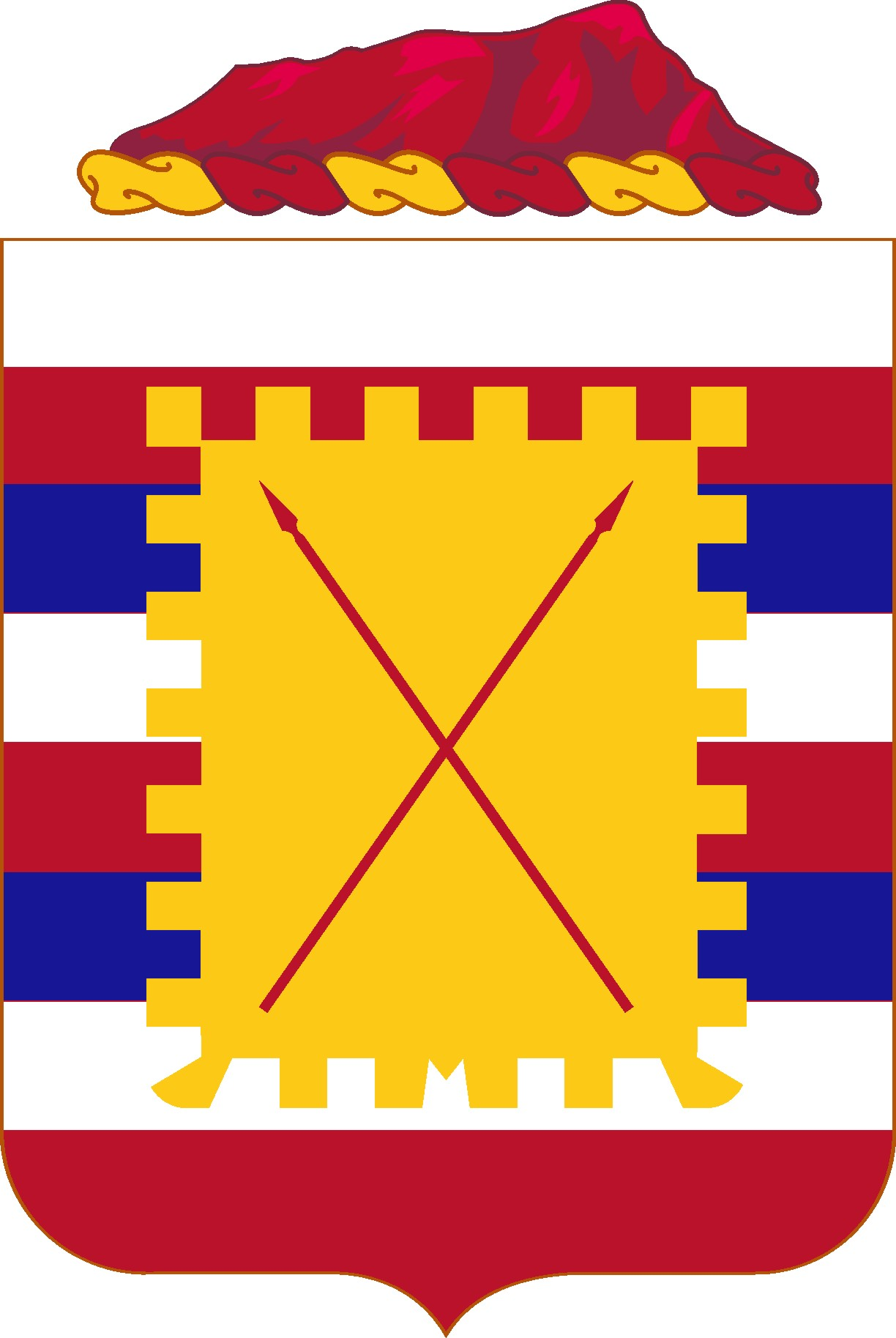
- Coat of arms
- Active: 1924–1944
- Country: United States
- Branch: Army
- Type: Coast artillery
- Role: Harbor defense
- Size: Regiment
- Part of: Harbor Defenses of Honolulu
- Garrison/HQ: Fort Ruger
- Motto: KAPU (Keep out)
- Mascot: Oozlefinch
- Engagements: Pearl Harbor

The 16th Coast Artillery Regiment was a Coast Artillery regiment in the United States Army, along with the 15th Coast Artillery, it manned the Harbor Defenses of Honolulu and other fortified sites on Oahu, Hawaii from 1924 until broken up into battalions in August 1944 as part of an Army-wide reorganization. The regiment manned many gun batteries at locations all over Oahu. Most of the forts where they were assigned were originally built 1899–1910, and had been in caretaker status for more than 30 years. On the morning of 7 December 1941, the soldiers of the 16th Coast Artillery manned their anti-aircraft guns, bringing down six of the attacking Japanese aircraft.

== Forts and Batteries manned by the 16th Coast Artillery ==
=== Fort Ruger ===
Fort Ruger was located in and around Diamond Head. The interior of the volcanic cone was accessible through two tunnels large enough for trucks. The administrative buildings were on the north side of the cone. The batteries included mortars placed when the fort was built, dating to 1910. Battery Ruger, like all of the 155mm batteries, were temporary emplacements using four "Panama mounts", a circular track surrounding a center pivot where a 155mm GPF gun was mounted. Battery Granger Adams was a typical pre-World War II coast defense emplacement, with the magazine in a protected bunker and the guns behind parapets in open mounts. It was built 1933–1935, with two 8-inch guns.

- Battery Harlow had eight 12 in (305 mm) mortars
- Battery Birkhimer had four 12 in (305 mm) mortars
- Battery Granger Adams had two 8 in (203 mm) rifles on barbette carriages
- Battery Dodge had two 4.72 in (120 mm) rifles on pedestal carriages
- Battery Ruger had four 155 mm (6.1 in) rifles on "Panama mounts"

=== Fort DeRussy ===
Fort DeRussy was located adjacent to Honolulu, on a portion of Waikiki Beach. The large caliber guns are mounted to disappearing carriages that use the recoil to lower the gun from the parapet to the loading platform. The allows the reloading crew a work area protected from shells fired by off-shore ships. The Anti Motor Torpedo Boat (ATMB) battery protected the close-in area around the fort from attack by high-speed motor torpedo boats.

- Battery Randolph had two 14 in (356 mm) rifles mounted on disappearing carriages.
- Battery Dudley had two 6 in (152 mm) rifles mounted on disappearing carriages.
- AMTB Battery No. 5 had two 90 mm (3.54 in) dual-purpose guns, each mounted on a separate fixed pedestal carriage

=== Fort Armstrong ===
Fort Armstrong was located at Kaakaukukui Reef, located at the east side of the entrance to Pearl Harbor.

- Battery Tiernon had two 3 in (76 mm) rapid fire guns mounted on pedestal carriages.

=== Fort Hase ===
In 1918, President Woodrow Wilson designated 322 acres (1.30 km^{2}) of land on Mokapu Peninsula, naming it Kuwaahoe Military Reservation. In 1939, the Navy constructed a small seaplane base there, designated as Naval Air Station Kaneohe Bay. The Naval Air Station's role was expanded to include the administration of the Kaneohe Bay Naval Defense Sea Area. A part of the 16th Coast Artillery moved onto the reservation in 1941. In 1942 the portion of the reservation that was occupied by the Coast Artillery was designated Fort Hase.

- Battery Pennsylvania at Ulupau Head was one of the two aft turrets salvaged from USS Arizona, mounting three 14 in (356 mm) naval guns.
- Battery Demerritt (construction #405) was tunneled into solid rock at Puu Papaa, mounting two 8 in (203 mm) guns on long-range barbette carriages.
- Battery Sylvester was four railroad spurs with four 8 in (203 mm) railway guns. The railway guns were later dismounted.
- Battery French (construction #301) was located at Pyramid Rock, mounting two 6 in (152 mm) guns on long-range shielded barbette carriages.
- AMTB Battery No. 2 was located at Pyramid Rock, had two 90 mm (3.54 in) dual-purpose guns, each mounted on a separate fixed pedestal carriage.
- Battery East Beach was four 155 mm (6.1 in) rifles on "Panama mounts".
- Battery North Beach was four 155 mm (6.1 in) rifles on "Panama mounts".
- Battery Pyramid Rock was four 155 mm (6.1 in) rifles on "Panama mounts".

== Lineage ==
Constituted 27 February 1924 in the Regular Army as 16th Coast Artillery (Harbor Defense) (HD), and organized 1 July 1924 at Fort Armstrong from the following companies- 104th, 90th, 99th, 105th, 111th, 159th, and 186th.

- HHB was activated and assigned to Fort Armstrong.
- Battery A was activated and assigned to Fort DeRussy Military Reservation.
- Battery C was activated and assigned to Fort Ruger.
- By July 1925, HHB moved to Fort Ruger.
- Battery G was constituted but not activated on 4 February 1932.
- Battery D was activated at Fort Ruger in June 1935 as a general service battery, augmented later that year due to secondary antiaircraft mission.
- In April 1941, Batteries A and C formed small detachments to man AA batteries in the Harbor Defenses of Honolulu.

1st and 2nd Battalions HHB, and Battery B were activated 6 August 1942 (Battery D was inactivated through detachments).

- Battery F was activated May 1942 (from part of Battery B, 41st CA Railway Regiment) and assigned to four 8 in (203 mm) M1888 railway guns of Battery Kahuku, located at Haleiwa, on Oahu's north shore.
- Battery E was activated August 1942 and assigned to Battery Dodge on the east rim of Diamond Head, Hawaii.
- Battery G (SL) was activated at Fort Hase, July 1942.
- Battery H was activated by redesignating 811th Coast Artillery Battery (Separate), transferred from the Temporary Harbor Defenses of Hilo, date unknown.

The regiment was broken up 29 May 1944 and personnel were transferred to the 15th Coast Artillery. The Regiment was then transferred (less personnel and equipment) to HD Kaneohe Bay and reactivated with personnel from the inactivated 41st Coast Artillery.

- on 14 August 1944 the regiment was inactivated and disbanded as follows:
- HHB to 16th Coast Artillery Group
- 55th Coast Artillery Battalion
- 56th Coast Artillery Battalion
- 16th CA Group operated part of the Hawaiian quartermaster depot until inactivated 10 April 1945. 55th CA Battalion inactivated 13 February 1945, 56th CA Battalion inactivated 10 April 1945.

== Distinctive unit insignia ==
- Description

A Gold color metal and enamel device 1 3/16 inches (3.0 cm) in height overall consisting of a shield blazoned: Or two spears in saltire Gules, within a bordure embattled barry of eight Argent, of the second and Azure, repeated.

- Symbolism

The shield is essentially Hawaiian. The crossed spears are taken from Hawaiian history, they were formerly placed at the King's tent, and are shown conventionally in the Hawaiian arms by a saltire cross placed on an inescutcheon.

- Background

The distinctive unit insignia was originally approved for the Coast Defense of Honolulu on 25 July 1922. It was amended to change the description on 6 December 1923. The insignia was redesignated for the 16th Coast Artillery Regiment on 27 February 1929. It was redesignated for the 16th Antiaircraft Artillery Gun Battalion on 11 September 1952.

== Coat of arms ==
=== Blazon ===
- Shield

Or two spears in saltire Gules, within a bordure embattled barry of eight Argent, of the second and Azure, repeated.

- Crest

On a wreath of the colors Or and Gules a representation of Diamond Head Gules. Motto KAPU (Keep Out).

=== Symbolism ===
- Shield

The shield is essentially Hawaiian. The crossed spears are taken from Hawaiian history, they were formerly placed at the King's tent, and are shown conventionally in the Hawaiian arms by a saltire cross placed on an inescutcheon. The motto, probably the best known Hawaiian word, is used extensively as a sign against trespassers.

- Crest

The batteries at Diamond Head constitute the principal element of these defenses.

=== Background ===
The coat of arms was originally approved for the Coast Defenses of Honolulu on 27 January 1922. It was redesignated for the 16th Coast Artillery Regiment on 27 February 1929. The insignia was redesignated for the 16th Antiaircraft Artillery Gun Battalion on 11 September 1952.

== Commanders ==
Commanders of the 16th Coast Artillery Regiment included:

- COL Lawrence C. Brown, 1 July 1924 – 4 August 1926
- MAJ Harry W. Stark, 4 August 1926 – 14 December 1926
- COL Percy P. Bishop, 14 December 1926 – 30 July 1929
- LTC Walter H. Merrill, 30 July 1929 – 25 October 1929
- COL Harold E. Cloke, 25 October 1929 – 9 June 1931
- MAJ Frank L. Hoskins, 9 June 1931 – 1 July 1931
- MAJ Monte J. Hickok, 1 July 1931 – 8 December 1931
- COL Harry L. Steele, 8 December 1931 – 16 August 1934
- LTC William E. Shedd Jr., 16 August 1934 – 23 October 1934
- COL George L. Wertenbaker, 23 October 1934 – 17 September 1936
- COL George A. Wildrick, 17 September 1936 – 6 October 1938
- LTC Felix E. Cross, 6 October 1938 – 16 November 1928
- COL William D. Frazer, 6 November 1938-August 1940
- LTC Adam E. Potts, August 1940-November 1940
- LTC Shuey E. Wolfe, November 1940-December 1940
- COL Paul H. Herman, December 1940-August 1942

== Campaign streamers ==
World War II

- Central Pacific

== Decorations ==
unknown

== See also ==
- Distinctive unit insignia (U.S. Army)
- Harbor Defense Command
- Seacoast defense in the United States
- United States Army Coast Artillery Corps
