= 15th Coast Artillery (United States) =

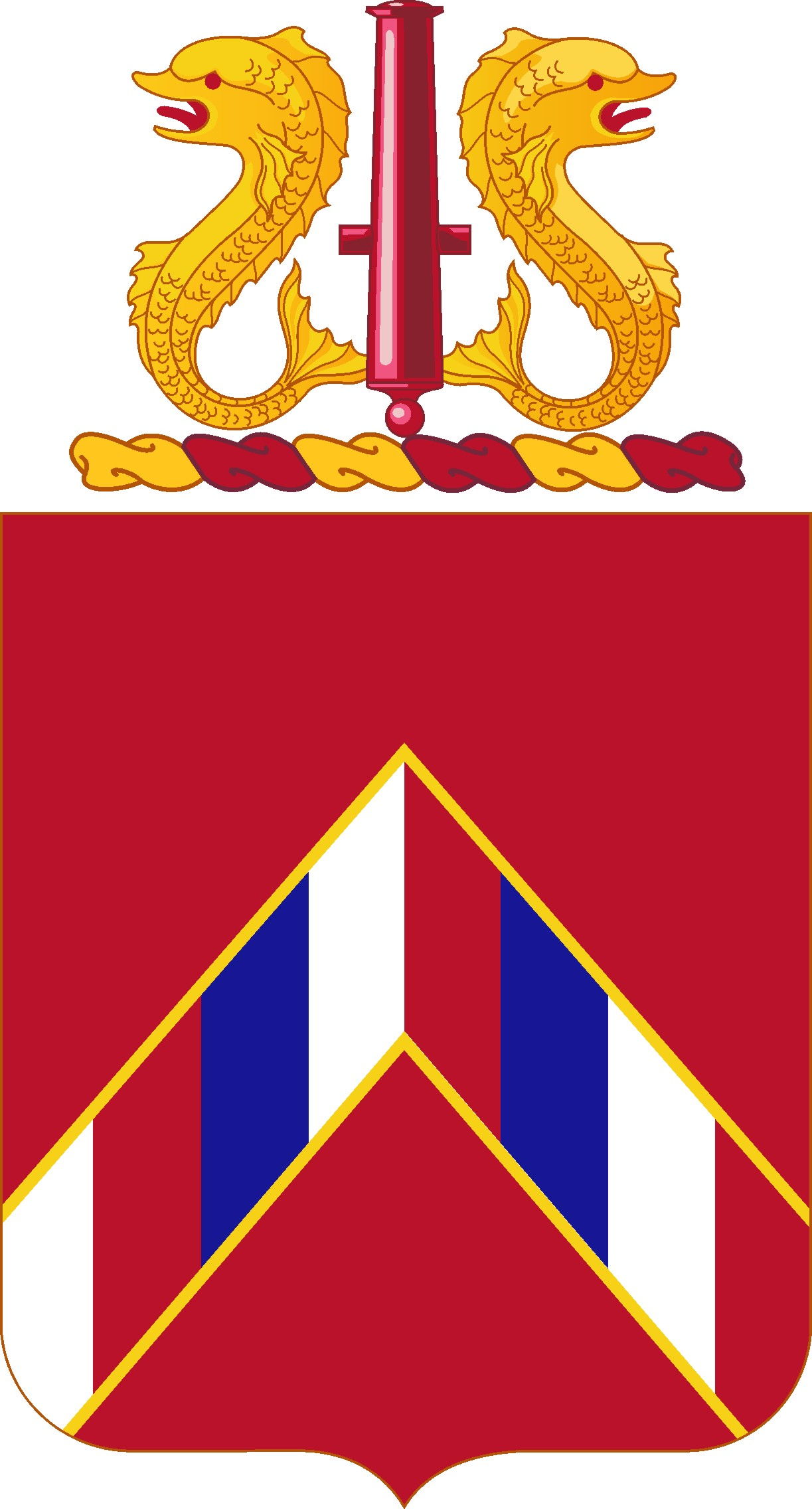
- Coat of arms
- Active: 1918–1944
- Country: United States
- Allegiance: United States Armed Forces
- Branch: United States Army
- Type: Coast Artillery Corps
- Role: Harbor defense
- Size: Regiment
- Part of: Harbor Defense Command
- Garrison/HQ: Fort Kamehameha
- Motto: "Littore Sistimus" (Coastal System)
- Mascot: Oozlefinch
- Engagements: Attack on Pearl Harbor

The 15th Coast Artillery was a Coast Artillery Corps regiment in the United States Army. Along with the 16th Coast Artillery, it manned the Harbor Defenses of Pearl Harbor and other fortified sites on Oahu, Hawaii from 1924 until broken up into battalions in August 1944 as part of an Army-wide reorganization.

== Lineage 1 ==
Constituted as the 15th Artillery (Coast Artillery Corps) (C.A.C.) and organized October 1918 at Fort Crockett, Texas, but demobilized in November 1918. This was one of a number of Coast Artillery regiments mobilized to operate heavy and railway artillery on the Western Front in World War I, but the Armistice resulted in the dissolution of the 15th.

== Lineage 2 ==
Constituted in the Regular Army 27 February 1924 as 15th Coast Artillery (Harbor Defense) (HD), and organized 1 July 1924 at Fort Kamehameha from the following Companies of the Coast Artillery Corps (CAC): 185th, 125th, 91st, 143rd, 184th, 86th, and 95th.

- only regimental Headquarters and Headquarters Battery (HHB) and Batteries A, B, and C activated.
- 2nd Battalion HHB, and Batteries G, H, and I, constituted 4 February 1932 but not activated.
- 1st and 2nd Battalion HHBs, and Batteries D, E, and G activated 1 August 1942.
- Battery F activated 22 May 1943 at Salt Lake, Hawaii, Battery H activated same date at Fort Kamehameha.
- Regiment assigned to Central Pacific Base Command 31 January 1944.
- On 29 May 1944 15th CA assumed responsibility for Oahu's south shore defenses; 16th CA elements there transferred to 15th CA.

Regiment disbanded on 15 August 1944 and broken up as follows:

- 15th Coast Artillery Group
- 53rd Coast Artillery Battalion
- 54th Coast Artillery Battalion

15th CA Group and 53rd CA Battalion inactivated 10 April 1945; 54th CA Battalion inactivated 10 April 1946.

In 1950 the 15th Coast Artillery Group was reconstituted and consolidated as the 15th Antiaircraft Artillery Group, with lineage inherited from the 15th Coast Artillery Regiment.

== Distinctive unit insignia ==
- Description

A Gold color metal and enamel device 1 1/32 inches (2.62 cm) in height overall consisting of a shield blazoned: Gules, a chevron paly of eight Argent, of the field (Gules), Azure and repeated, the ordinary fimbriated Or. Attached below and to the sides of the shield a Gold scroll inscribed “LITTORE SISTIMUS” in Blue letters.

- Symbolism

The shield is red for the Artillery and the chevron is in the colors of the old royal Hawaiian flag, which also appeared in the arms of the Coast Defenses of Pearl Harbor. The motto translates to “We Take Our Stand On The Shore.”

- Background

The distinctive unit insignia was originally approved for the 15th Coast Artillery Regiment on 17 April 1925. It was redesignated for the 15th Artillery Group on 2 June 1966.

== Coat of arms ==
=== Blazon ===
- Shield

Gules, a chevron paly of eight Argent, of the field (Gules), Azure and repeated, the ordinary fimbriated Or.

- Crest

On a wreath of the colors Or and Gules, a cannon palewise Gules, between two dolphins hauriant, dexter and sinister, Or, langued of the first. Motto: LITTORE SISTIMUS (We Take Our Stand On The Shore).

=== Symbolism ===
- Shield

The shield is red for the Artillery and the chevron is in the colors of the old royal Hawaiian flag, which also appeared in the arms of the Coast Defenses of Pearl Harbor.

- Crest

The crest shows the big gun supported by the dolphins - the king of fishes - indicating the command of the coast.

=== Background ===
The coat of arms was approved for the 15th Coast Artillery Regiment on 16 April 1925. It was rescinded/cancelled on 26 December 1974.

== Campaign streamers ==
World War II

- Central Pacific

== Decorations ==
unknown

== See also ==
- Distinctive unit insignia (U.S. Army)
- Seacoast defense in the United States
- United States Army Coast Artillery Corps
- Harbor Defense Command
