= Fort DeRussy Military Reservation =

- Battery Randolph
- U.S. National Register of Historic Places
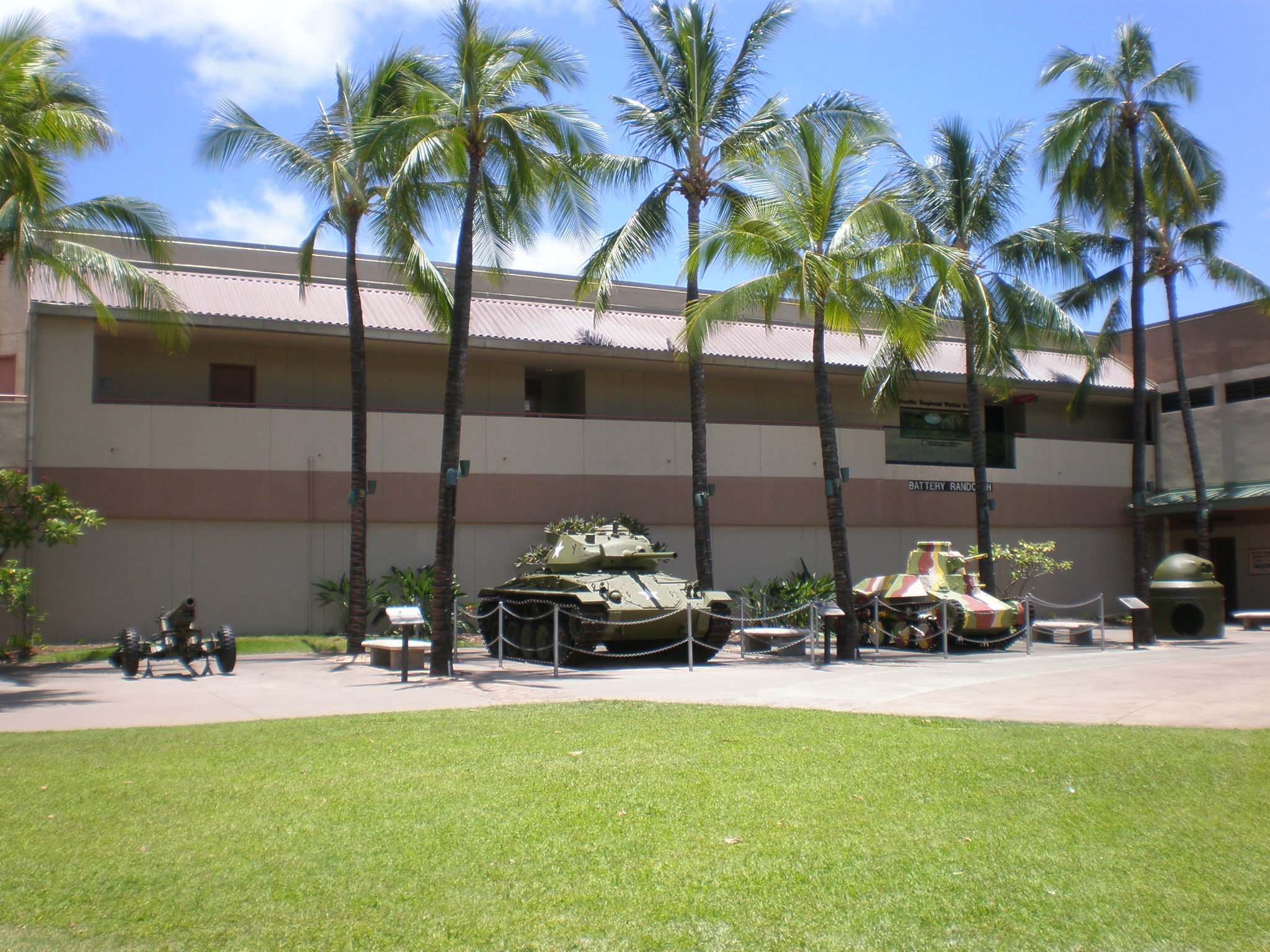
- U.S. Army Museum of Hawaiʻi at Fort DeRussy

- Location within Hawaii
- Location: 32 Kalia Rd., Honolulu, Hawaii
- Coordinates: 21°16′44″N 157°50′1″W
- Built: 1911
- MPS: Artillery District of Honolulu TR
- NRHP reference No.: 84000971
- Added to NRHP: June 5, 1984

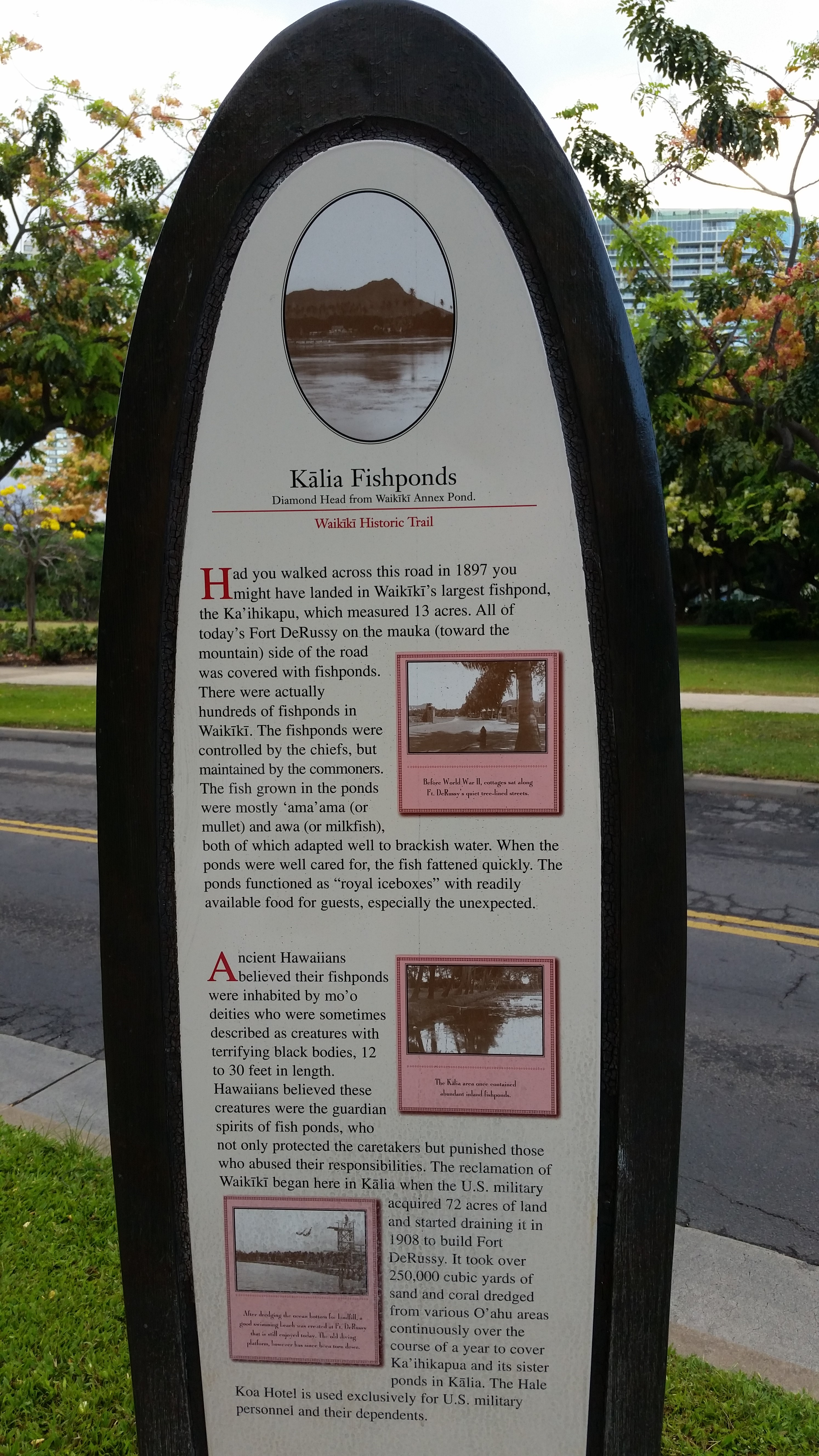
Historical marker for the Kalia fish ponds, the current location of the fort

Fort DeRussy is a United States military reservation in the Waikiki area of Honolulu, Hawaii, under the jurisdiction of the United States Army. Unfenced and largely open to public traffic, the installation consists mainly of landscaped greenspace. The former Battery Randolph now houses the U.S. Army Museum of Hawaiʻi, which is open to the public. The Hale Koa Hotel, an Armed Forces Recreation Center, and the Daniel K. Inouye Asia-Pacific Center for Security Studies are also located on Fort DeRussy.

== History ==
The property was once owned by Chinese millionaire merchant Chun Afong, who built a villa on the three acres of landscaped grounds. Chun used this property to host parties and receive royal guests, dignitaries, diplomats, military officers and others. He sold the property in 1904 to the United States Army Corps of Engineers for $28,000; the Army constructed Batteries Randolph and Dudley (no longer extant). High Chiefess Elizabeth Kekaʻaniau Pratt and her husband Franklin Seaver Pratt may have also owned property on the site called Bath Villa.

Fort DeRussy in Honolulu is one of five Forts DeRussy in the United States. There is Fort DeRussy (Louisiana) in Louisiana, one in Kentucky, and Fort DeRussy (Washington, D.C.) in Washington, D.C.: these four were all built during the American Civil War. This one was named for General René Edward De Russy (1789–1865), who supervised military fort construction and was also Superintendent of West Point during his career. Coming as children with their family to the United States as refugees from Saint-Domingue (now Haiti), both René and his younger brother Louis grew up in Virginia and graduated from the United States Military Academy at West Point. At advanced ages, both served during the American Civil War: René on the Union side and Louis in the Confederate Army, the oldest West Point graduate to serve in it.

Located on Waikiki Beach, near Oahu's historic Royal Hawaiian Hotel and the Moana Hotel, the former Shore Battery Randolph was used as a site for servicemen on Rest and Recuperation (R&R) during the Vietnam War. Fort DeRussy was one of a number of shore batteries on the island of Oahu originally designed to provide coastal defense. Due to the increased effectiveness of air attacks, most of the guns on these sites were retired during the early 1950s. The 14-inch guns of Shore Battery Randolph were fired once in a practice shortly after the Attack on Pearl Harbor. This resulted in shattering many of the windows in the Royal Hawaiian and Moana hotels, and the guns were not fired again.

== Active facilities ==
Official military facilities include the Daniel K. Inouye Asia-Pacific Center for Security Studies, the Fort DeRussy Chapel, and the Hale Koa Hotel, a Morale, Welfare and Recreation facility.

== U.S. Army Museum of Hawaiʻi ==
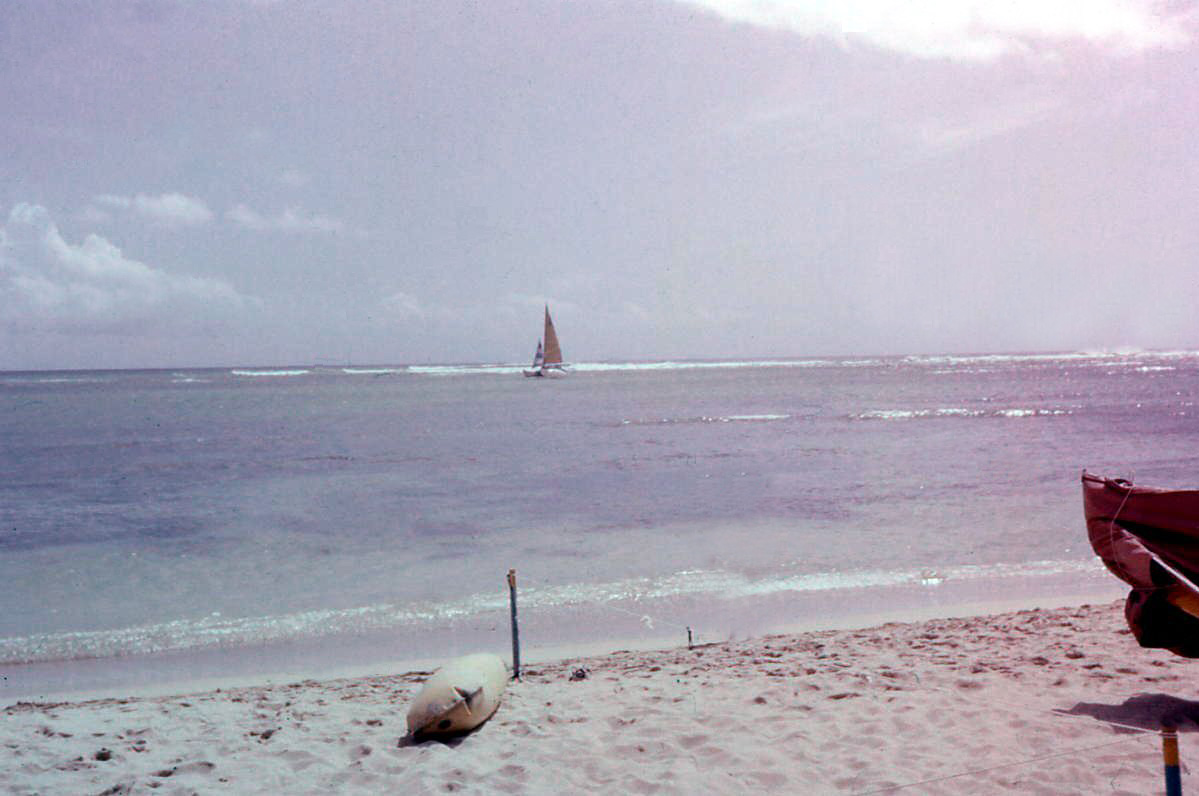
Fort DeRussy Beach, 1959

The U.S. Army Museum of Hawaiʻi is housed inside Battery Randolph, a former coastal artillery battery. Battery Randolph was constructed in 1911 to defend Honolulu Harbor on Oahu from attack, and was equipped with two 14-inch guns on disappearing carriages, with a range of about 40,000 yards (37 km) (22.99 miles). It was named for Maj Benjamin H. Randolph (who died 1907).

The museum's collection contains some World War II armor and AH-1 Cobra helicopter displays outdoors, and small arms indoors, as well as the battery itself. The exhibits cover the history of US Army warfare in the Pacific hemisphere and admission is free. It is located on Kalia Road, coordinates 21°16′44″N 157°50′1″W.

Another installation of two 6-inch guns was called Battery Dudley, named for Gen. Edgar S. Dudley (died 1911). The "Artillery District of Honolulu" (state historic site 80-13-1382) was added to the National Register of Historic Places listings in Oahu on June 5, 1984.

== See also ==
- 16th Coast Artillery (United States)
