= Fort Ruger =

- Part of U.S. Army Coast Artillery Corps
- Honolulu, Hawaiʻi

Site history
- Built: 1906
- In use: 1906–present

- Fort Ruger Historic District
- U.S. National Register of Historic Places
- U.S. Historic district
- Location within Hawaii
- Location: Diamond Head Rd., Honolulu, Hawaii
- Coordinates: 21°16′3″N 157°48′31″W
- Built: 1911
- NRHP reference No.: 83000249
- Added to NRHP: July 14, 1983

Fort Ruger is a fort on the island of Oʻahu that served as the first military reservation in the Territory of Hawaii. Named after Civil War General Thomas H. Ruger and built in and around Diamond Head Crater, the fort was established by the United States for the purpose of defending the harbor of its newly annexed territory. The fort was established in 1906 as Diamond Head Reservation and renamed Fort Ruger in 1909.

== History ==
Fort Ruger was the site of Battery Harlow, armed with eight 12-inch mortars. The fort's prominent location on Diamond Head made it a natural fire control station, with several posts built into Lēʻahi Peak.

The Fort is listed on the National Register of Historic Places, with portions of the site still being used for training by the Hawaii National Guard.

Few of the original buildings survive. The most striking are three sets of stone structures that mark former gates to the fort. On the Waikiki side, there is a pair of gateposts on either side of the sidewalk and a square stone bunker across the street with a gun slit in the outside wall and with crenels and merlons along the top, as if it were a battlement in a European castle. On the Kahala side is a larger stone gatehouse with rounded edges of the kind popular in the 1930s. Between them, on the Kaimuki side, is a purely decorative structure, a circular stonewalled planter with two jagged stone arches intersecting at 90-degree angles. It now stands at the edge of the Kapiʻolani Community College parking lot, but was once flanked by two large gun barrels.

== Images ==
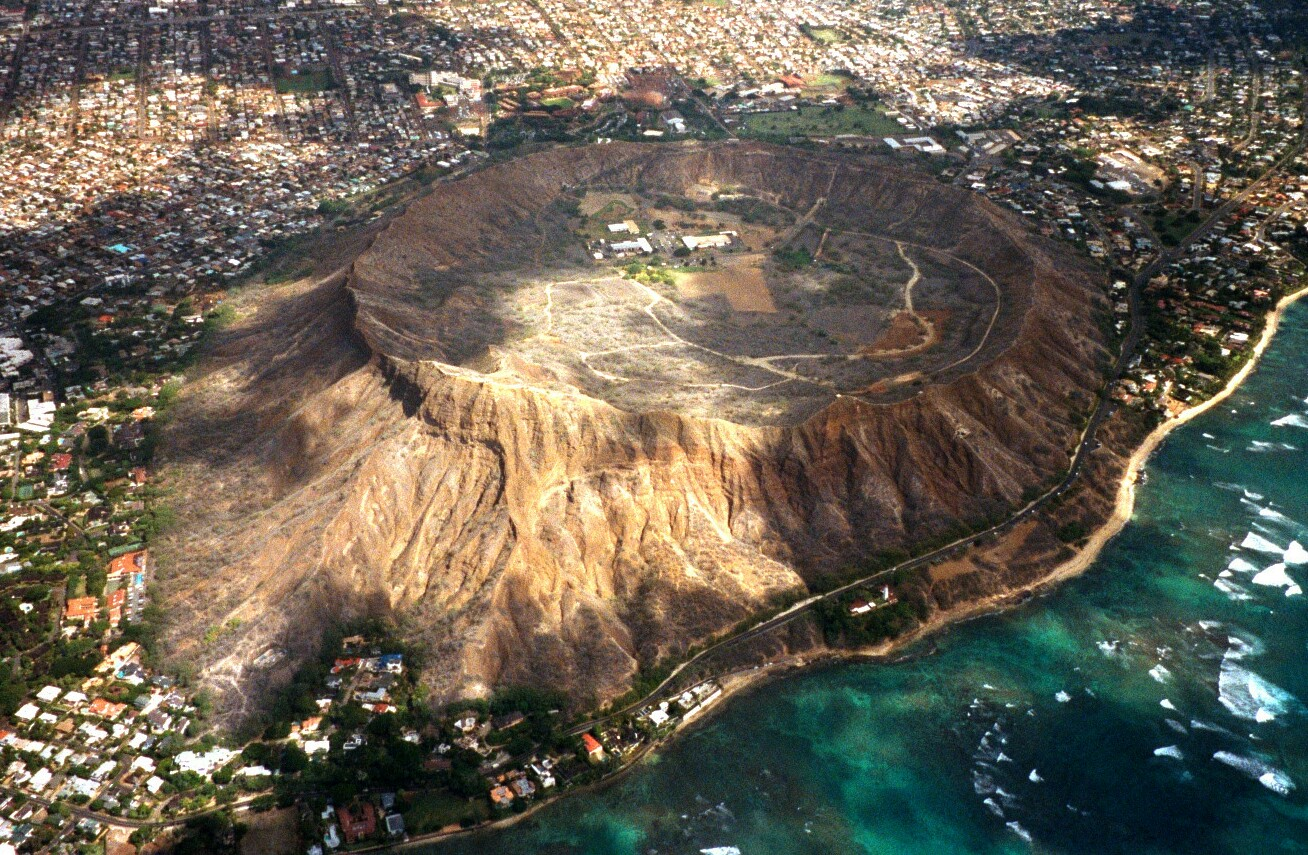
Aerial view of Diamond Head Crater

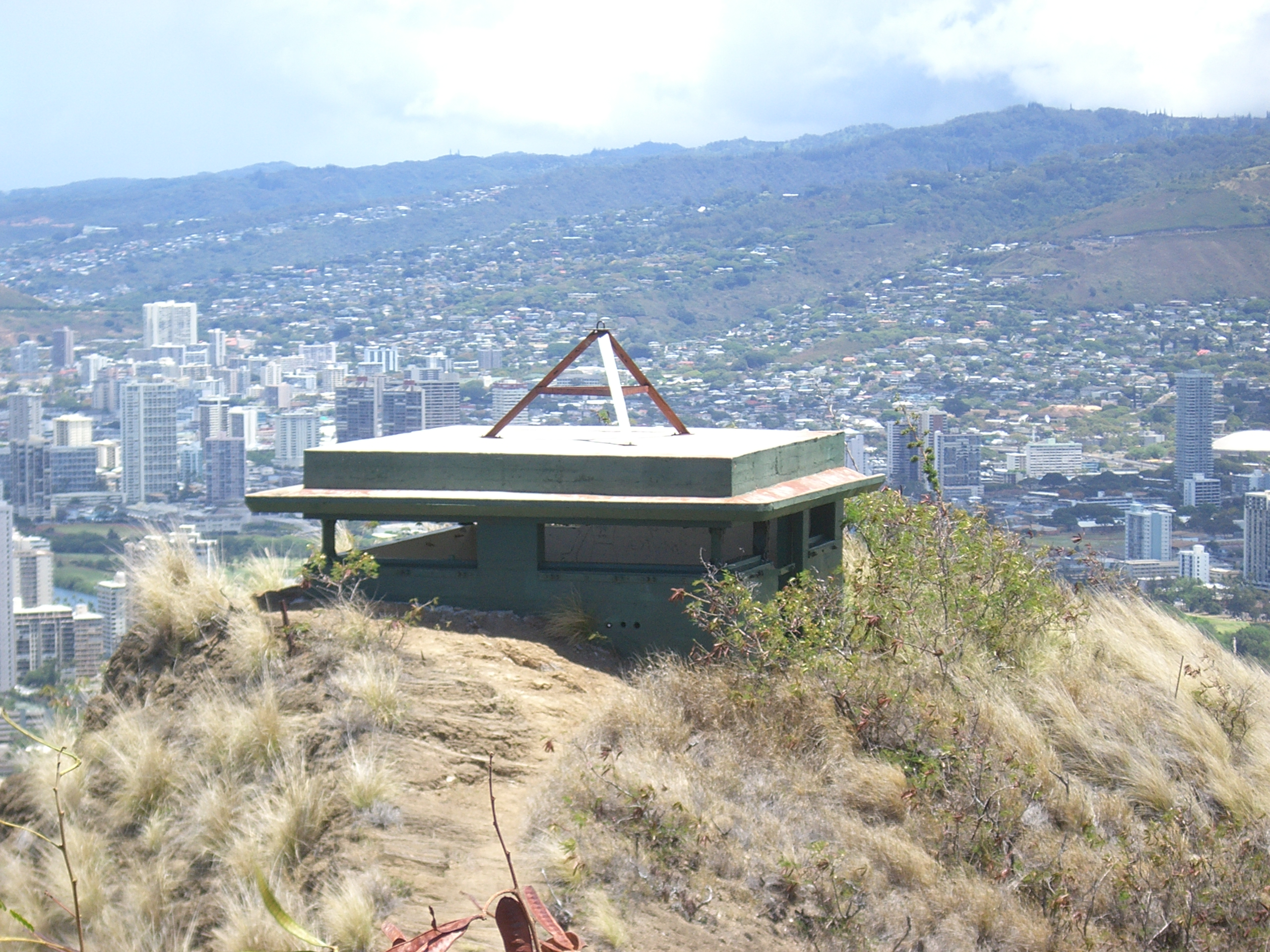
Bunker on ridge of Diamond Head

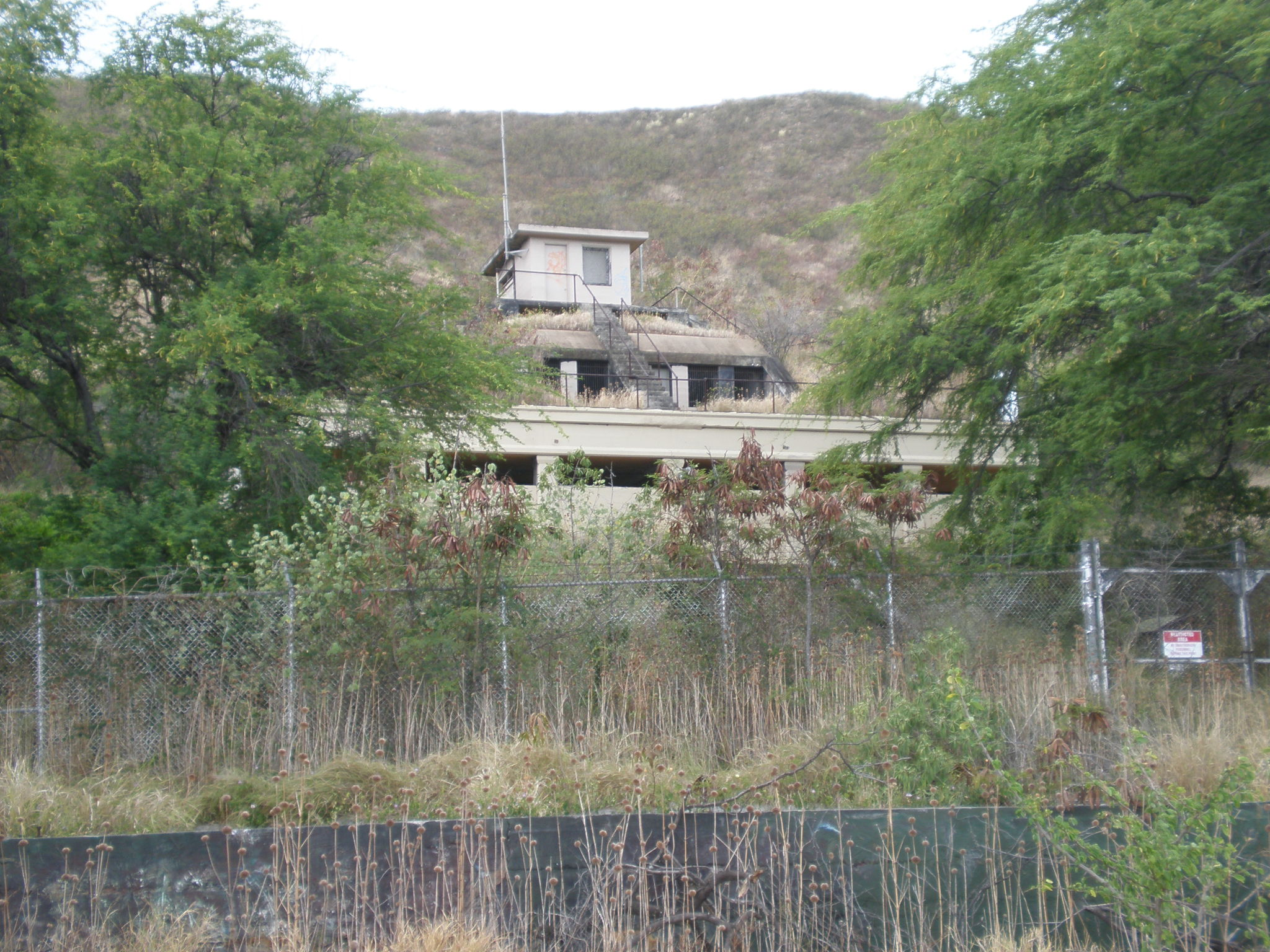
Battery Harlow as seen from Diamond Head Road

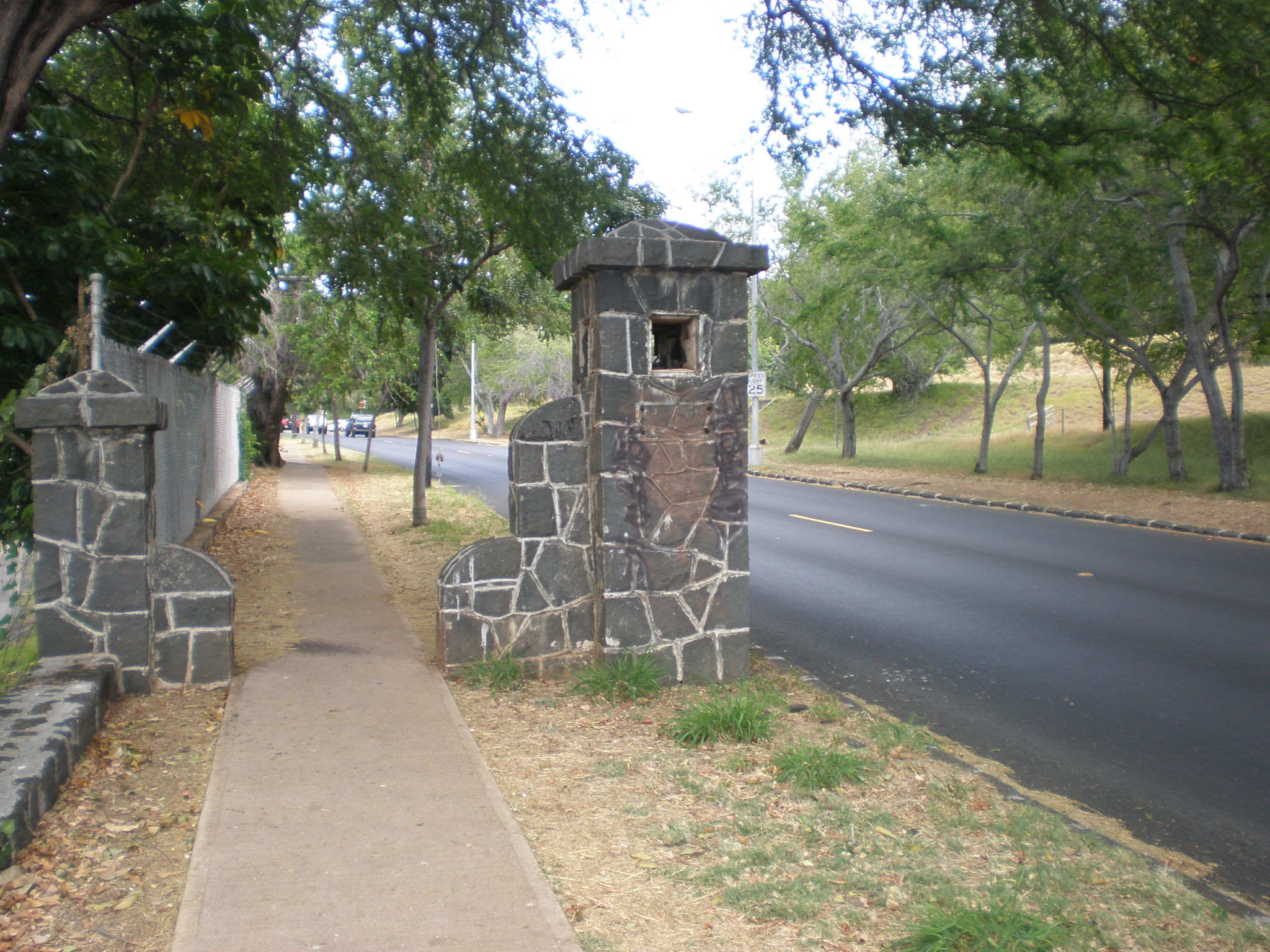
Old entrance gatepost, Waikiki side

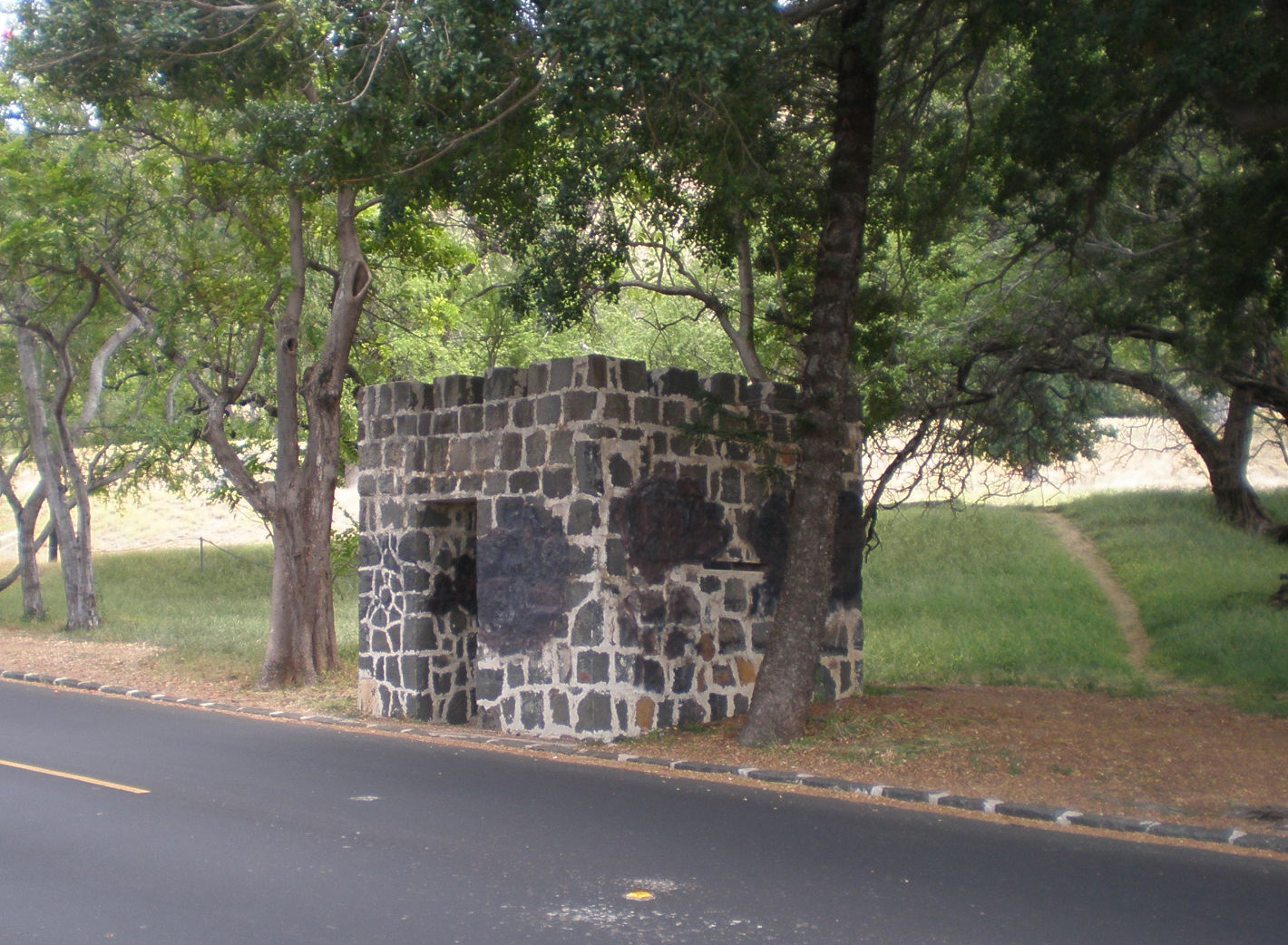
Old gate guardhouse, Waikiki side

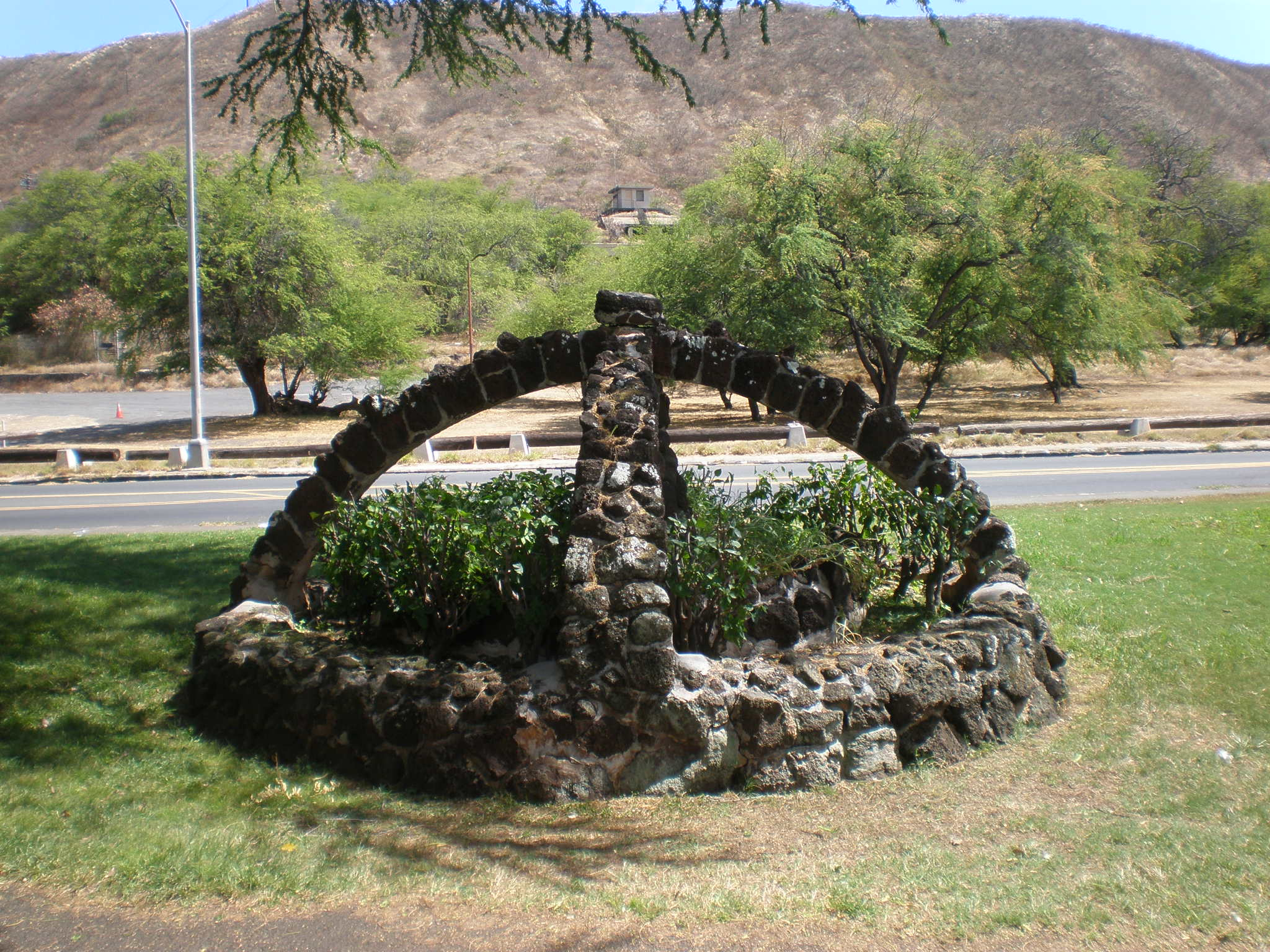
Stone artwork, Kaimuki side

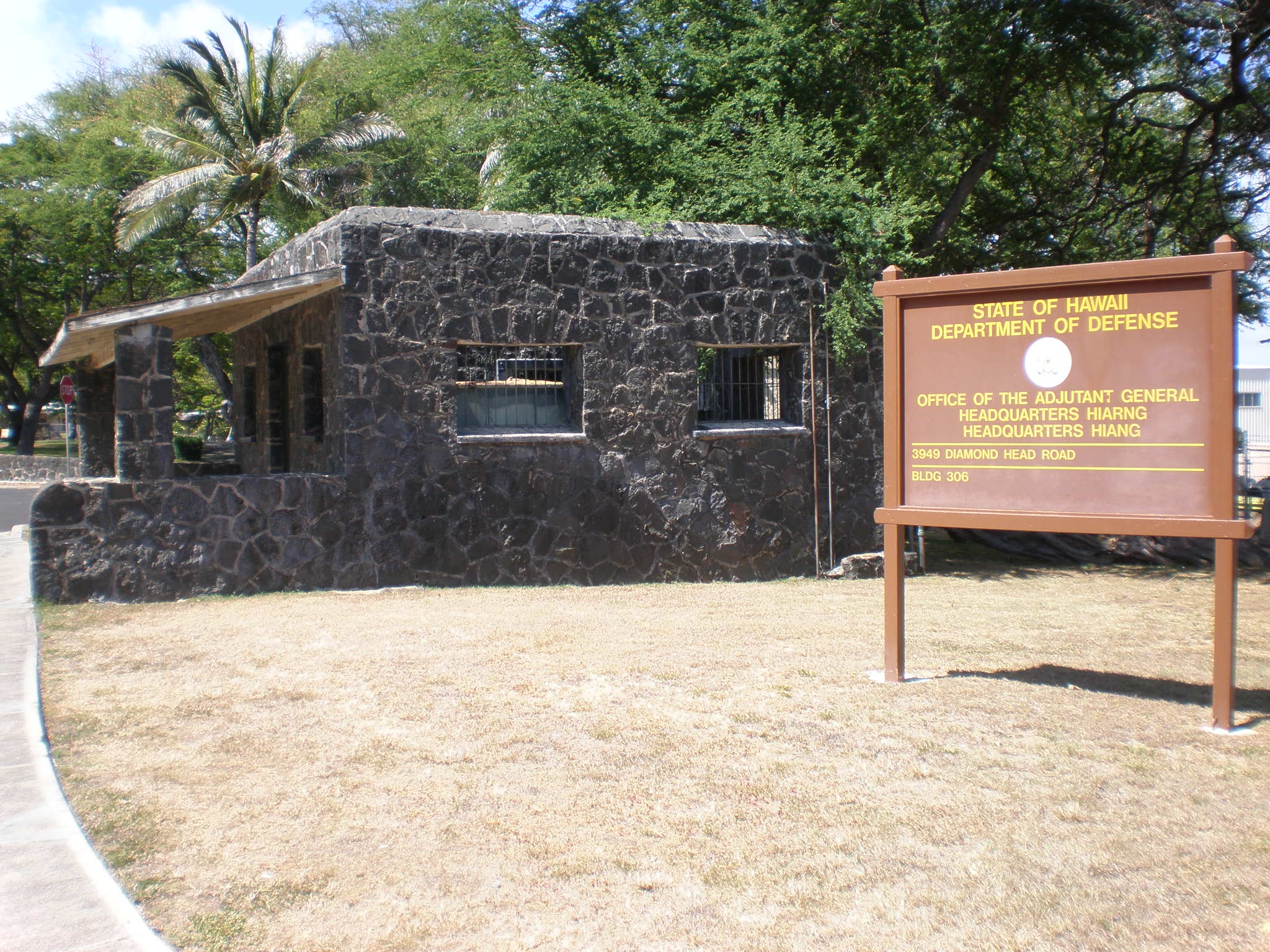
Old gatehouse & current signpost, Kahala side

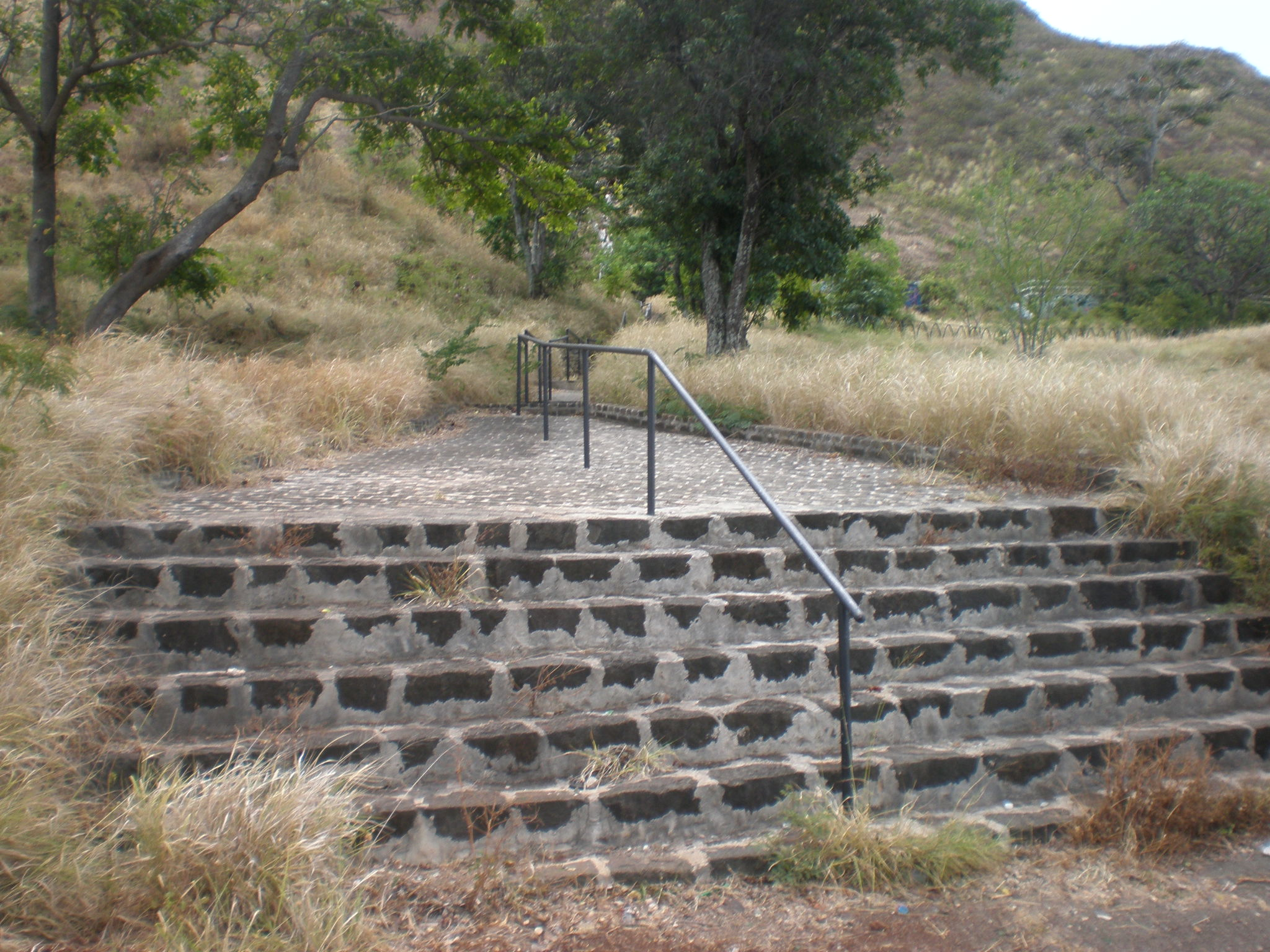
Stairs that led to the old Cannon Club

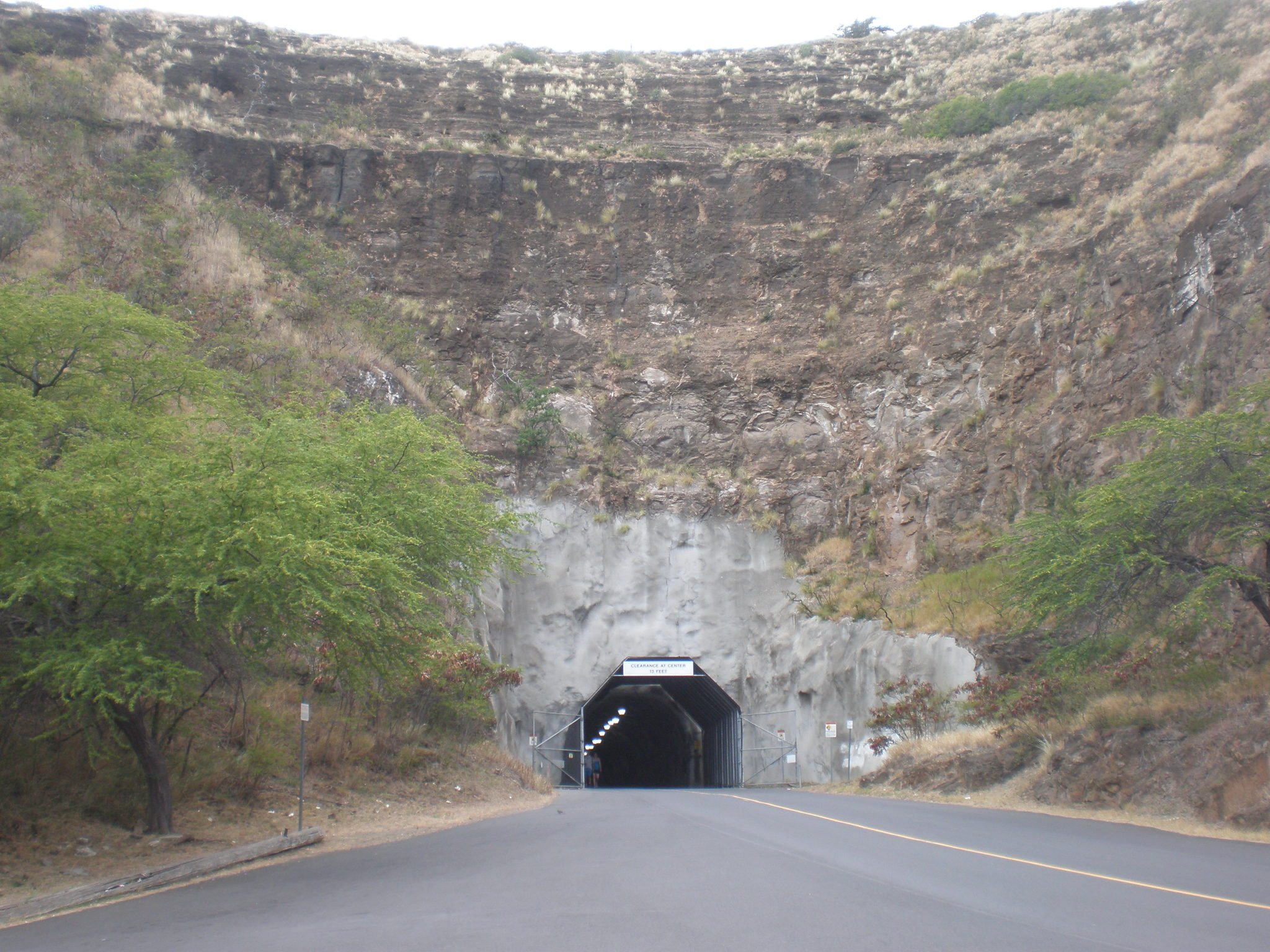
Tunnel into Diamond Head Crater

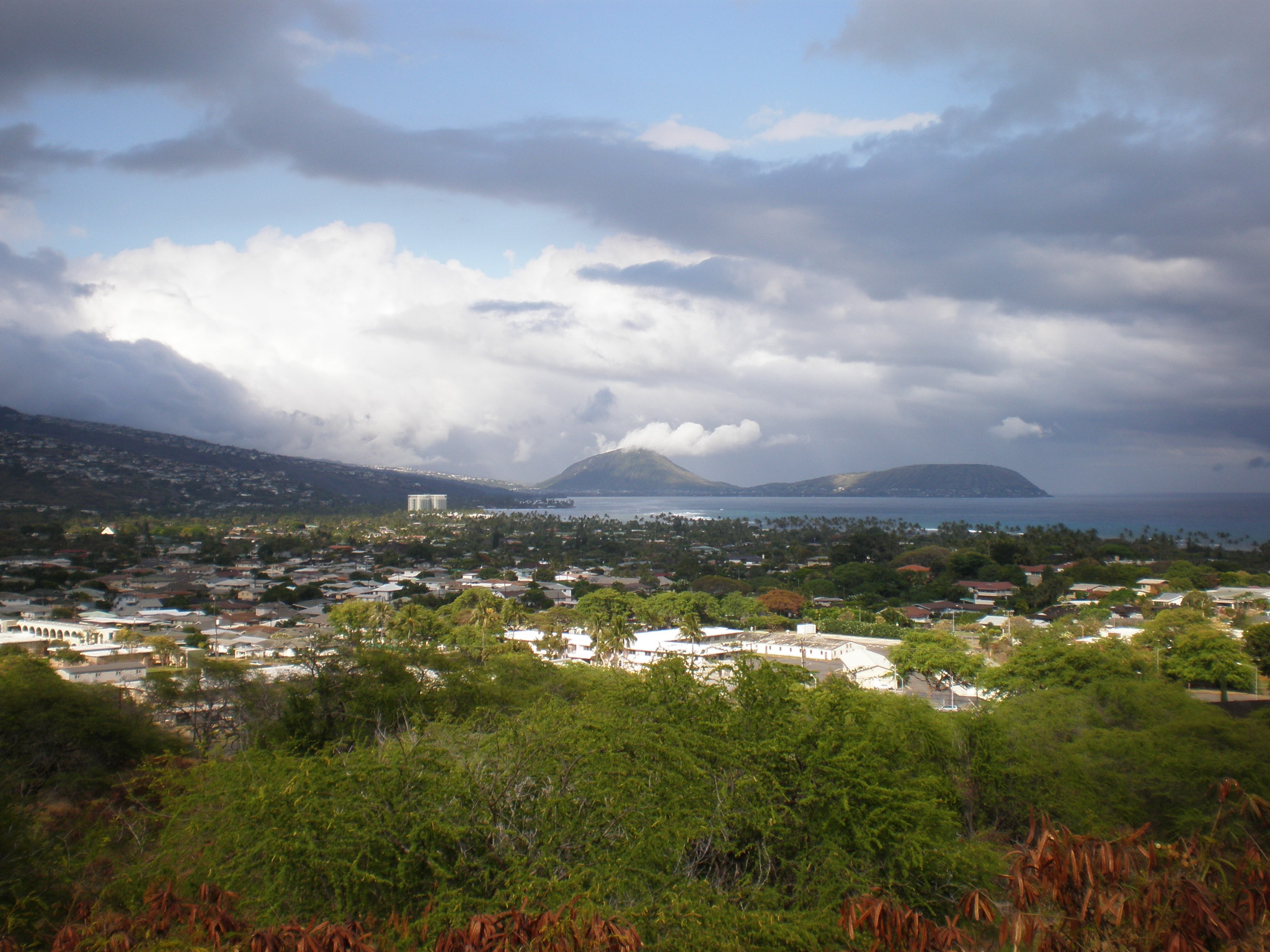
View over Kahala toward Koko Head

== See also ==
- 16th Coast Artillery (United States)
- 64th Coast Artillery (United States)
