= 242nd Coast Artillery (United States) =

242nd Coast Artillery Regiment
- Active: 1924 – 1944
- Country: United States
- Branch: Army
- Type: Coast artillery
- Role: Harbor defense
- Size: Regiment
- Part of: Harbor Defenses of Long Island Sound
- Garrison/HQ: Fort Terry
- Mascot: Oozlefinch

The 242nd Coast Artillery Regiment was a Coast Artillery Corps regiment in the Connecticut National Guard. It garrisoned the Harbor Defenses of Long Island Sound (HD Long Island Sound), New York 1924–1944.

== History ==
The 242nd Coast Artillery was organized 29 May 1924 as the Connecticut National Guard component of the Harbor Defenses of Long Island Sound (HD Long Island Sound), New York. The 11th Coast Artillery was the Regular Army component of those defenses. The 242nd's primary armory was in Bridgeport, Connecticut. In October 1944 the regiment was broken up into two battalions as part of an Army-wide reorganization.

== Lineage ==
The regiment's lineage originated with the organization of the 3rd and 4th Connecticut Regiments in 1739. With some reorganization, these units went on to serve in the Revolutionary War and the American Civil War, the 4th Connecticut becoming the 1st Connecticut Heavy Artillery Regiment during the latter war. By 1907 they had merged and were redesignated as the Coast Artillery Corps, Connecticut National Guard. Following the American entry into World War I in April 1917, the companies were called into federal service by 25 July and redesignated as companies of the Coast Defenses of Long Island Sound. Five companies were used to form the 56th Artillery (Coast Artillery Corps) on the Western Front in France. On 14 September 1923 the units were reorganized as the 242nd Artillery, Coast Artillery Corps.

On 16 September 1940 the regiment was inducted into federal service in Bridgeport, Connecticut and moved to Fort H.G. Wright in HD Long Island Sound 23 September 1940. On 7 November 1940 the regiment moved to Fort Terry.

On 13 September 1943 the 3rd Battalion of the 242nd transferred to the Harbor Defenses of New Bedford, Massachusetts and was redesignated as the 2nd Battalion, 23rd Coast Artillery.

On 7 October 1944 the regiment was broken up into the 190th and 242nd Coast Artillery Battalions (at Fort Terry and Fort Michie, respectively), which were deactivated 1 April 1945.

As of 2014 the 242nd's lineage was carried by the 242nd Engineer Detachment, Connecticut Army National Guard, in Niantic, Connecticut.

== See also ==
- Seacoast defense in the United States
- United States Army Coast Artillery Corps
- Harbor Defense Command
