= 11th Air Defense Artillery Brigade =

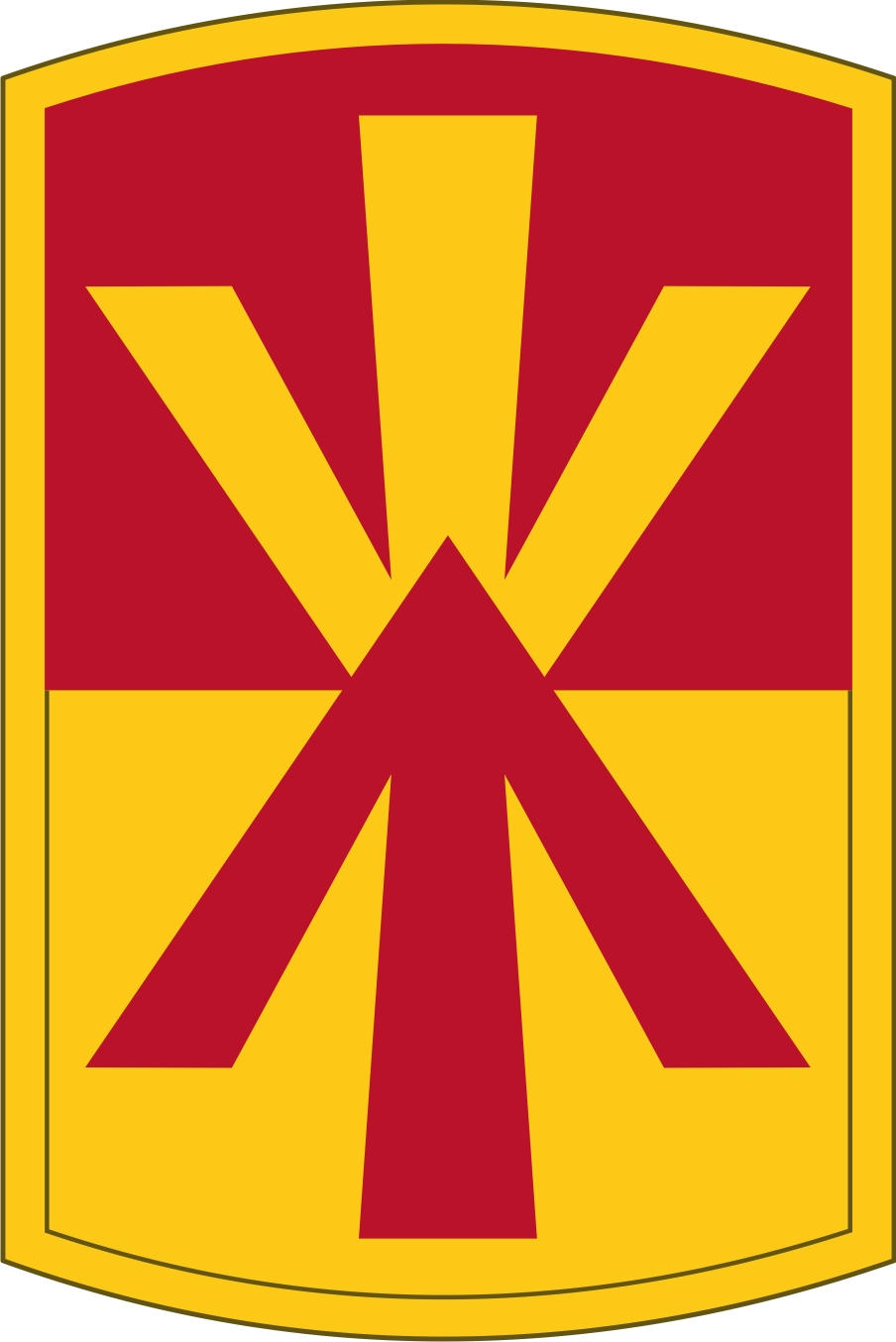
- 11th Air Defense Artillery Brigade Shoulder Sleeve Insignia
- Active: 1907 – Present
- Country: United States
- Branch: United States Army
- Type: Air Defense Artillery Branch
- Size: Brigade
- Part of: 32nd Army Air and Missile Defense Command (32nd AAMDC)
- Garrison/HQ: Fort Bliss
- Nickname: Imperial Brigade
- Motto: "Train to Fight!"
- Colors: Scarlet and Yellow

Commanders
- Current commander: COL John R. Kirchgessner
- Command Sergeant Major: CSM Francisco J. Lloret Jr.

Insignia
- Distinctive Unit Insignia

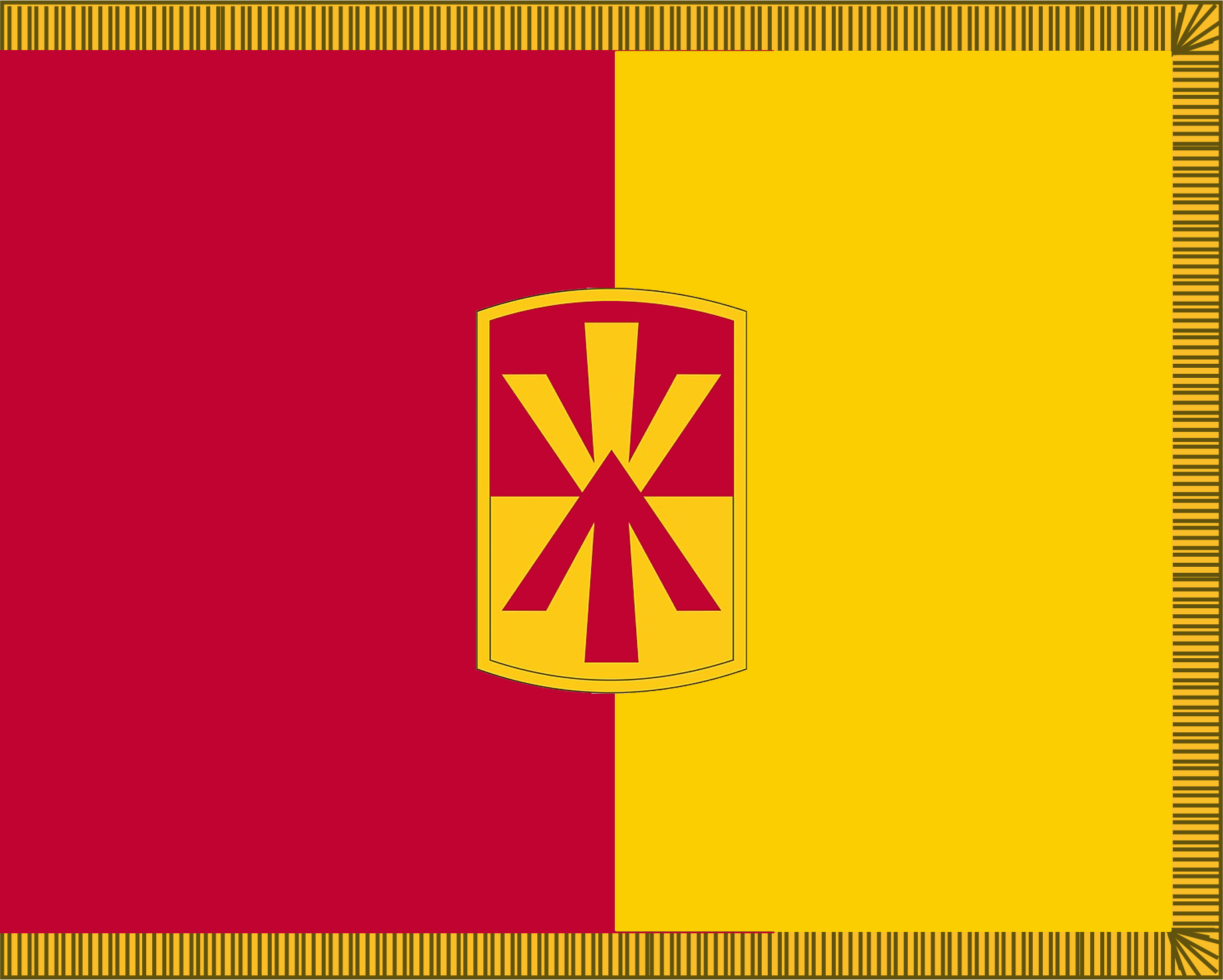
- 11th Air Defense Artillery Brigade Flag

The 11th Air Defense Artillery Brigade is an air defense artillery brigade of the United States Army stationed at Fort Bliss.

== Structure ==
The brigades includes a Headquarters and Headquarters battery, three Patriot Units, one IBCS Unit, and three (THAAD) Units.

- 11th Air Defense Artillery Brigade, at Fort Bliss (TX)
  - Headquarters and Headquarters Battery (HHB)
  - 1st Battalion, 43rd Air Defense Artillery Regiment (1-43rd ADA) (Patriot)
  - 2nd Battalion, 43rd Air Defense Artillery Regiment (2-43rd ADA) (Patriot)
  - 6th Battalion, 43rd Air Defense Artillery Regiment (6-43rd ADA) (IBCS)
  - 5th Battalion, 52nd Air Defense Artillery Regiment (5-52nd ADA) (Patriot)
  - A Battery, 2nd Air Defense Artillery Regiment (A-2nd ADA) (THAAD)
  - B Battery, 2nd Air Defense Artillery Regiment (B-2nd ADA) (THAAD)
  - A Battery, 4th Air Defense Artillery Regiment (A-4th ADA) (THAAD)

== Lineage ==
The unit was initially constituted 25 January 1907 in the Regular Army as the 133rd Company, Coast Artillery Corps. Organized 1 August 1907 at Fort Terry, New York. Redesignated 3 July 1916 as the 3d Company, Fort Terry (New York). Redesignated 31 August 1917 as the 13th Company, Coast Defenses of Long Island Sound. Redesignated in December 1917 as Battery A, 56th Artillery (Coast Artillery Corps). Demobilized 31 July 1921 at Camp Jackson, South Carolina.

Reconstituted 1 June 1922 in the Regular Army; concurrently consolidated with the 4th Company, Coast Defenses of Long Island Sound (organized in June 1917 as the 7th Company, Fort H.G. Wright (New York); redesignated 31 August 1917 as the unit was redesignated as the 133rd Company, Coast Artillery Corps.

- Redesignated 1 July 1924 as Headquarters Battery, 11th Coast Artillery (Headquarters, 11th Coast Artillery, concurrently constituted and activated at Fort H.G. Wright, New York). Inactivated 7 April 1944 at Fort Leonard Wood, Missouri. Disbanded 14 June 1944.
- Headquarters and Headquarters Battery, 11th Coast Artillery, reconstituted 28 June 1950 in the Regular Army; concurrently consolidated with Headquarters and Headquarters Battery, 11th Antiaircraft Artillery Group (active), and Antiaircraft Artillery Group. Inactivated 27 April 1953 at Fort Tilden, New York. Activated 15 January 1955 at Camp Stewart, Georgia.
- HHB, 11th AAA Group (Continental) was redesignated as Headquarters & Headquarters Battery, 11th Artillery Group (Air Defense) on 20 March 1958. Transferred from Fort Jackson, South Carolina, to Rehoboth, Massachusetts, 15 May 58. Controlled 4th Battalion, 56th Artillery and 4-68 Artillery at Providence, Rhode Island. Inactivated at the Rehoboth, Massachusetts Defense Area, 26 August 1960 or 25 September 1960.
- Activated 1 May 1967 at Fort Carson, Colorado. Headquarters and Headquarters Battery 11th Air Defense Artillery was inactivated 26 May 1967 at Fort Carson, Colorado. Activated 1 September 1971 at Fort Bliss, Texas. Redesignated 15 March 1972 as Headquarters and Headquarters Battery, 11th Air Defense Artillery Group. Reorganized and redesignated 16 December 1980 as Headquarters and Headquarters Battery, 11th Air Defense Artillery Brigade.

Headquarters and Headquarters Battery, 11th Antiaircraft Artillery Group was constituted 19 December 1942 in the Army of the United States as Headquarters and Headquarters Battery, 11th Antiaircraft Automatic Weapons Group. Activated 20 January 1943 at Camp Davis, North Carolina. Redesignated 26 May 1943 as Headquarters and Headquarters Battery, 11th Antiaircraft Artillery Group. Inactivated 6 October 1945 in Germany. Allotted 9 December 1948 to the Regular Army. Activated 15 January 1949 at Fort Bliss, Texas.

== Recent history ==
The brigade served in the Persian Gulf War, during which the brigade recorded the first intercept of a ballistic missile in combat. Prior to its deployment it consisted of:

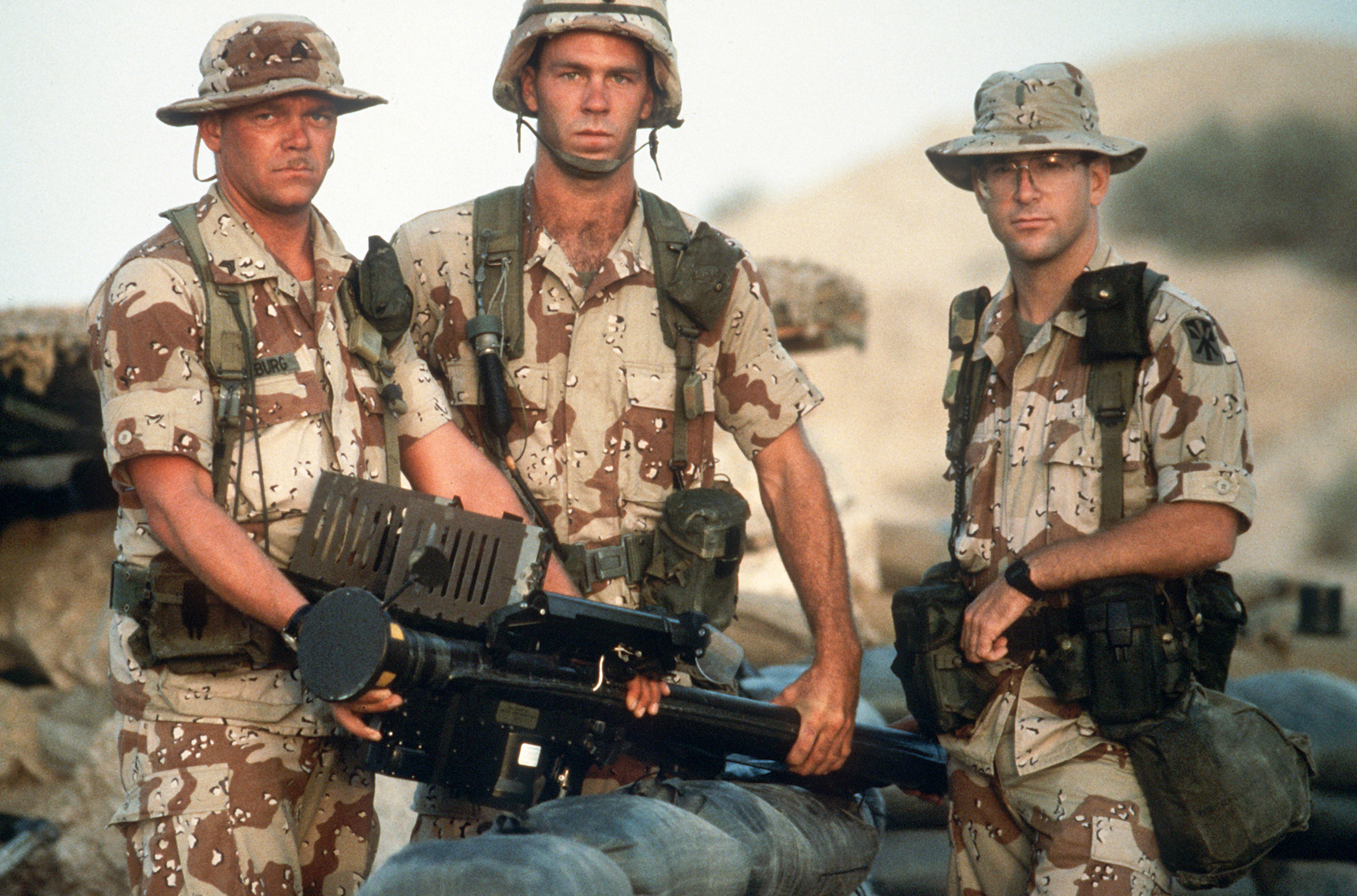
American soldiers of the 562nd Air Defense Artillery Regiment and 11th Air Defense Artillery Brigade holding a FIM-92 Stinger posing for a photograph during the Persian Gulf War

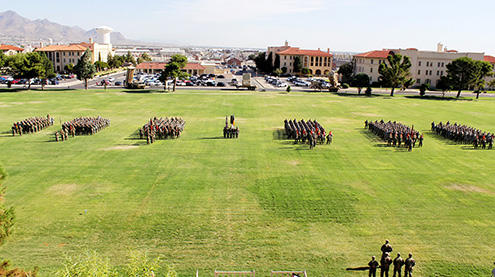
- 11th Air Defense Artillery Brigade, change of command ceremony, Noel parade field, West Fort Bliss.
  1st Battalion, 2nd ADA (M48 Chaparral)
- 2nd Battalion, 7th ADA (Patriot)
- 3rd Battalion, 43rd ADA (Patriot)
- 2nd Battalion, 1st ADA Task Force with 2-1 ADA (Hawk) and 2-43 ADA (Patriot)

The 1st Battalion, 2nd ADA was left behind at Fort Stewart when the brigade deployed. Battery D, 1st Battalion, 7th ADA (Patriot) was attached from 94th ADA Brigade, 32nd AADCOM in Europe, and 2nd Battalion, 43rd ADA was attached from 10th ADA Brigade, 32nd AADCOM.

Thomas D. Dinackus notes that every battalion that was part of the brigade received the Valorous Unit Award, despite three of the battalions (those not equipped with Patriot) not having fired a single shot in anger.
