= 11th Coast Artillery (United States) =

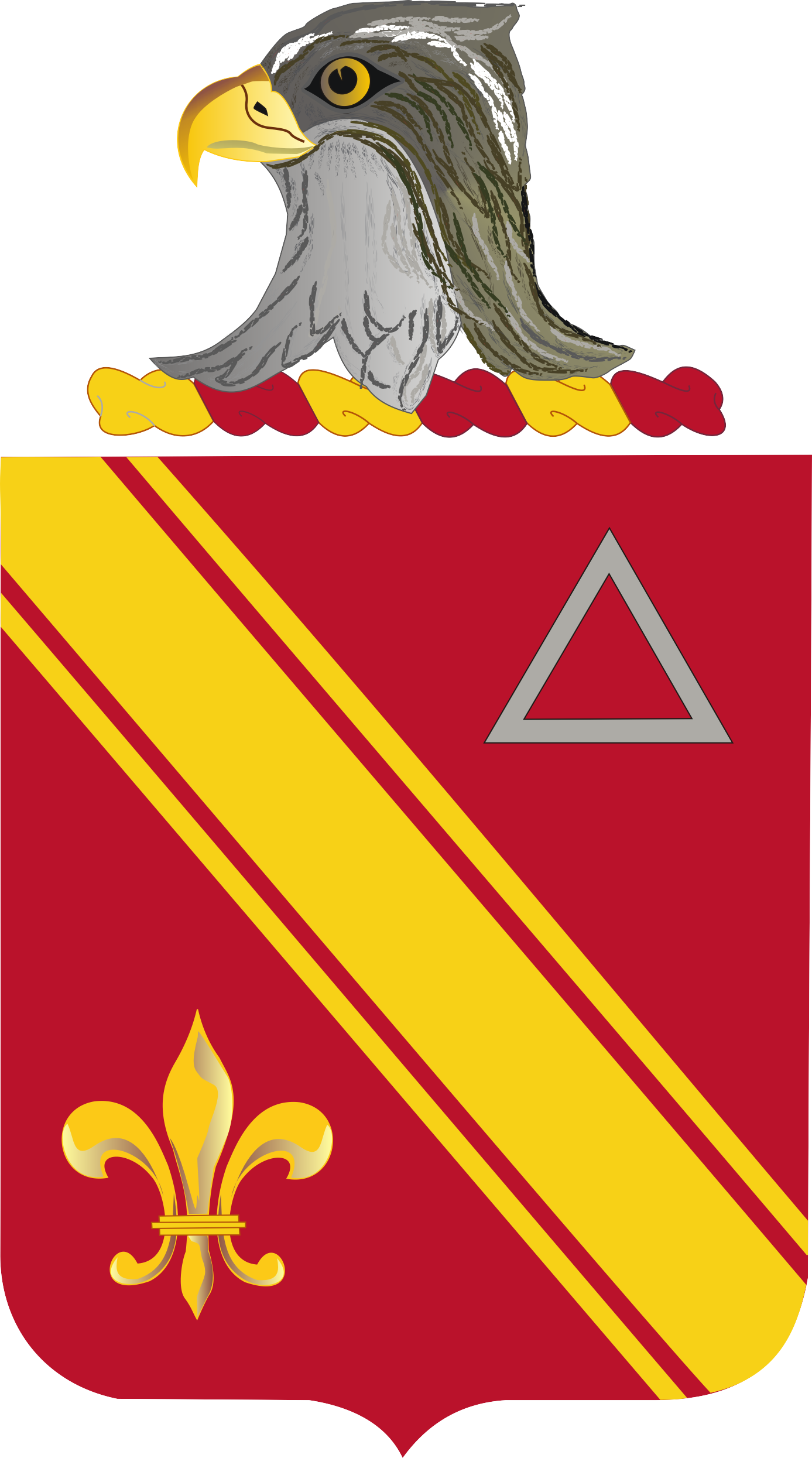
- Coat of arms
- Active: 1924
- Country: United States
- Branch: Army
- Type: Coast artillery
- Size: Regiment
- Part of: Harbor Defenses of Long Island Sound
- Garrison/HQ: Fort H.G. Wright
- Motto(s): "Audax et Vigilans" (Daring and Vigilant)
- Mascot(s): Oozlefinch
- Engagements: World War II

The 11th Coast Artillery was a coast artillery regiment in the United States Army, first constituted in the Regular Army on 27 February 1924. It primarily served as the Regular Army component of the Harbor Defenses of Long Island Sound (HD Long Island Sound), New York from 1924 through 1944, when it was relieved and disbanded as part of an Army-wide reorganization.

== Lineage ==
Constituted 27 February 1924 as the 11th Artillery (CAC) and organized 1 July 1924 at Fort H.G. Wright, Fishers Island, New York from the following companies:

- HHB from 133rd Company (activated)
- A Battery from 135th Company
- B Battery from 141st Company
- C Battery from 148th Company
- D Battery from 157th Company
- E Battery from 161st Company
- F Battery from 175th Company
- G Battery from 100th Company (activated)
- H battery from 131st Company (activated)
- I battery from 132nd Company (activated)
- K Battery from 146th Company (activated)

The regiment was posted at Fort H.G. Wright and provided caretaking detachments for Fort Terry and Fort Michie, both on islands in the Harbor Defenses of Long Island Sound. The 242nd Coast Artillery was the Connecticut National Guard component of those defenses. Live fire practice with heavy guns for other coast artillery units in and near New England was carried out at Fort H.G. Wright, hence the relatively large number of batteries active in peacetime.

On 1 September 1935 the regiment was reorganized from Type A to Type B. Batteries G, H, I, and K were deactivated and personnel transferred to HHB 1st Battalion and A, B, and C batteries.

- 2nd Battalion HHB and batteries D and E activated 1 July 1939 at Fort H.G. Wright.
- Battery F activated 1 August 1940.
- Battery G activated as searchlight battery 10 February 1941.

Regimental assets absorbed by HD Long Island Sound and HHB assigned to XXII Corps 23 February 1944. HHB transferred to Fort Leonard Wood 14 March 1944, inactivated 7 April 1944; regiment disbanded 14 June 1944. Personnel were reassigned to three field artillery battalions.

- Headquarters and Headquarters Battery, 11th Coast Artillery, reconstituted 28 June 1950 in the Regular Army; concurrently consolidated with Headquarters and Headquarters Battery, 11th Antiaircraft Artillery Group (active), and consolidated unit designated as Headquarters and Headquarters Battery, 11th Antiaircraft Artillery Group. (see 11th Air Defense Artillery Brigade for further lineage.)

== Distinctive unit insignia ==
- Description

A Gold color metal and enamel device 1 1/8 inches (2.9 cm) in height overall consisting of a shield blazoned: Gules a bend cottised Or between in sinister chief a triangle voided point up Argent and in dexter base a fleur-de-lis of the second. Attached above the shield on a wreath Or and Gules an osprey’s head of the third. Attached below and to the sides of the shield a Gold scroll inscribed "AUDAX ET VIGILANS" in Black letters.

- Symbolism

The shield is that of the old 56th Artillery, C.A.C., of which three batteries of the 11th Coast Artillery were a part; Headquarters, A, and C Batteries. The silver triangle was the insignia for the 56th Artillery in France. The fleur-delis was taken from the coat of arms of the old Province of Ile de France, where the regiment first went into action. The crest is taken from the old Coast Defenses of Long Island Sound. The motto translates to "Daring and Vigilant" and is applicable to a Coast Artillery Regiment and is quite symbolic of the fish hawk or osprey, which is a very daring and vigilant bird.

- Background

The distinctive unit insignia was originally approved for the 11th Coast Artillery Regiment on 11 November 1924. It was redesignated for the 11th Antiaircraft Artillery Automatic Weapons Battalion on 8 August 1951. The insignia was redesignated for the 11th Antiaircraft Artillery Missile Battalion on 31 August 1956.

== Coat of arms ==
=== Blazon ===
- Shield

Gules a bend cottised Or between in sinister chief a triangle voided point up Argent and in dexter base a fleur-de-lis of the second.

- Crest

On a wreath of the colors Or and Gules, an osprey’s head erased Proper. Motto: AUDAX ET VIGILANS (Daring and Vigilant).

=== Symbolism ===
- Shield

The shield is that of the old 56th Artillery, C.A.C., of which three batteries of the 11th Coast Artillery were a part, Headquarters A and C Batteries. The silver triangle was the insignia for the 56th Artillery in France. The fleur-delis was taken from the coat of arms of the old Province of Ile de France, where the regiment first went into action.

- Crest

The crest is taken from the old Coast Defenses of Long Island Sound. The motto is applicable to a Coast Artillery Regiment and is quite symbolic of the fish hawk or osprey, which is a very daring and vigilant bird.

=== Background ===
The coat of arms was originally approved for the 11th Coast Artillery Regiment on 1 November 1924. It was redesignated for the 11th Antiaircraft Artillery Automatic Weapons Battalion on 8 August 1951. The insignia was redesignated for the 11th Antiaircraft Artillery Missile Battalion on 31 August 1956.

== See also ==
- Distinctive unit insignia (U.S. Army)
- Seacoast defense in the United States
- United States Army Coast Artillery Corps
- Harbor Defense Command
