= M1897 =

M1897 can refer to:

- Canon de 75 modèle 1897, a field gun (also 75 mm gun M1897 in US service)
- 5-inch gun M1897, a US coast artillery gun
- 6-inch gun M1897, a US coast artillery gun
- Winchester Model 1897, a shotgun
- Webley-pocket M1897, a revolver
