= Fort H. G. Wright =

Former U.S. military installation on Fishers Island, New York

- Part of Harbor Defenses of Long Island Sound
- Fishers Island, Southold, New York
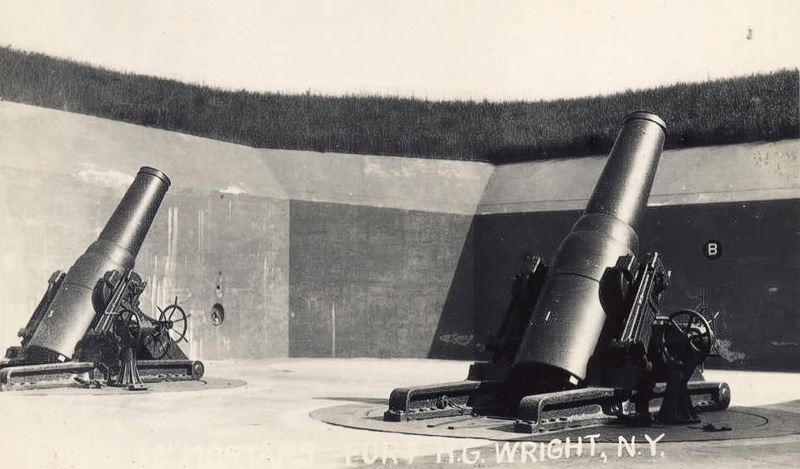
- 12-inch mortars, Battery Clinton, Fort H. G. Wright

Site information
- Type: Coastal Defense
- Controlled by: private/Town of Southold
- Open to the public: partly

Location
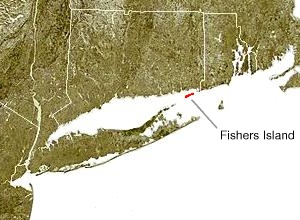
- Coordinates: 41°15′13″N 72°01′49″W

Site history
- Built: 1898–1906
- Built by: United States Army
- In use: 1898–1958
- Battles/wars: World War I World War II

Garrison information
- Garrison: 11th Coast Artillery Regiment; 242nd Coast Artillery Regiment

Fort H. G. Wright was a United States military installation on Fishers Island in the town of Southold, New York, two miles offshore from southeastern Connecticut. It was part of the Harbor Defenses of Long Island Sound, along with Fort Terry, Fort Michie, and (in World War II) Camp Hero. These forts defended the eastern entrance to Long Island Sound, as well as Connecticut's ports and the north shore of Long Island. The fort was named for Union General Horatio G. Wright, a former Chief of Engineers who was born in Clinton, Connecticut.

The fort was first developed in the early 20th century and was active in the First and Second World Wars. Following the Second World War, it was deactivated as a coast defense fort.

== History ==
=== Construction and armament ===
Fort H. G. Wright was built as part of the large-scale Endicott Program, which recommended a comprehensive replacement of existing coast defenses. The forts were designed and built by the Army Corps of Engineers, the weapons were designed by the Army Ordnance Corps, and the forts were (by 1907) garrisoned by the Coast Artillery Corps. Fort H. G. Wright was the headquarters of the Coast Defenses of Long Island Sound (later Harbor Defenses). Construction of gun batteries at Fort H. G. Wright began in 1898. By 1906 the following batteries were completed:

Name	No. of guns	Gun type	Carriage type	Years active
Dynamite	1	15-inch (381 mm) dynamite gun	pedestal	1898–1904?
Clinton	8	12-inch (305 mm) mortar M1890	barbette M1896	1902–1943
Butterfield	2	12-inch (305 mm) gun M1895	disappearing M1897	1901–1945
Barlow	2	10-inch (254 mm) gun M1895	disappearing M1896	1901–1943
Dutton	3	6-inch (152 mm) gun M1897	disappearing M1898	1902–1944
Hamilton	2	6-inch (152 mm) gun M1903	disappearing M1903	1905–1917
Marcy	2	6-inch (152 mm) gun M1903	disappearing M1903	1906-1917
Hoffman	2	3-inch (76 mm) gun M1902	pedestal M1902	1905–1945
Hoppock	2	3-inch (76 mm) gun M1903	pedestal M1903	1913–1946

Facilities for a nearby underwater minefield were also built. Battery Dynamite, on Race Point at the southwest end of the island, had a 15-inch pneumatic gun firing a dynamite-loaded projectile. It is unclear when this battery was built. This type of weapon was determined to be inferior to conventional guns and was withdrawn from service in 1904. Battery Hoppock was completed in 1905 but does not appear to have been armed until 1913, with guns transferred from Battery Greble at Fort Terry.

In an unusual move, the fort's 10-inch (254 mm) and 12-inch (305 mm) guns were replaced in 1911–1914. This was probably due to their use for live-fire practice; the fort's offshore location allowed it to be used more frequently for this than other Northeastern forts. Battery Butterfield's 12-inch (305 mm) M1895 guns were replaced by the guns of the same model in 1911–12, while Battery Barlow's 10-inch M1895 guns were replaced by 10-inch (254 mm) M1888 guns in 1914.

=== World War I ===
Following the American entry into World War I in April 1917, changes were made at the stateside forts with a view to putting some coast artillery weapons into the fight on the Western Front. The Coast Artillery Corps manned almost all US heavy and railway artillery in that war, with stateside forts reduced to a minimum garrison to provide gun crews in France. The forts were also important as mobilization and training centers. In 1917 the four 6-inch (152 mm) M1903 guns of Batteries Hamilton and Marcy were removed from the fort, mounted on field carriages, and sent to France. However, a history of the Coast Artillery in World War I states that none of the regiments in France equipped with 6-inch guns completed training in time to see action before the Armistice. A forcewide restructuring of 12-inch (305 mm) mortar batteries, generally removing half the mortars of each battery to speed reloading, resulted in Battery Clinton losing four of its eight mortars in 1918. In many cases the removed mortars were converted to railway artillery, and this appears to have happened to Battery Clinton's mortars, but none of these were sent to France. None of the removed guns at Fort H. G. Wright were replaced, and in 1920 the carriages were ordered scrapped. A battery of four 5-inch (127 mm) M1900 guns was proposed for North Hill in 1917, using two guns removed from Fort Terry and two from the nearby Fort Mansfield, but was never built.

=== Between the wars ===
In 1924 the Coast Artillery Corps adopted a regimental organization, and the 11th Coast Artillery Regiment of the Regular Army was established for Long Island Sound, with headquarters at Fort H. G. Wright, with the 242nd Coast Artillery Regiment of the Connecticut National Guard as the reserve component. In 1936–1937 the fort's 10-inch (254 mm) and 12-inch (305 mm) guns were again replaced with weapons of the same model. In 1936 Battery Barlow's 10-inch (254 mm) guns were replaced by weapons from Fort Wetherill in Rhode Island, and in 1937 Battery Butterfield's 12-inch (305 mm) guns were also replaced, probably due to their use for live-fire practice. Battery Barlow appears to have been deactivated in 1939, and its guns and carriages were scrapped in 1943. A three-gun anti-aircraft battery, probably armed with the 3-inch (76 mm) gun M1917, was built in the 1930s. The fort included an airfield, and a balloon hangar existed 1920–1962.

=== World War II ===
From 1940–1944 the Harbor Defenses of Long Island Sound were garrisoned by the 11th Coast Artillery of the Regular Army and the 242nd Coast Artillery Regiment of the Connecticut National Guard. Harbor defense in the Long Island Sound area was based on building two 16-inch (406 mm) gun batteries at Camp Hero in Montauk. Combined with the 16-inch (406 mm) gun at Fort Michie, these rendered all other heavy guns in the area obsolete. Fort H. G. Wright's 10-inch (254 mm) and 12-inch (305 mm) guns, 12-inch (305 mm) mortars, and the remaining 6-inch (152 mm) guns of Battery Dutton were scrapped in 1943–1945. As most of the weapons were scrapped, the coast artillery regiments were replaced by the 190th and 242nd coast artillery battalions in 1944. Fort H. G. Wright did receive some new batteries during the war, but the heavier portions of them were never mounted, as the threat from German surface ships was negligible by 1943. A 16-inch (406 mm) gun battery (no. 111) was completed in 1944 with the guns delivered on Mount Prospect near Wilderness Point, but the guns were never mounted. Two 6-inch (152 mm) gun batteries were built, one at Race Point (no. 215) in 1943 and one at Wilderness Point (no. 214) in 1944, but only the Race Point battery was armed, with M1903 guns. The Navy operated G-class blimps from the airfield during the war. A naval training school for "indicator loops" (for magnetic detection of submarines) operated on the island as well.

New World War II batteries at and near the fort included:

Name	No. of guns	Gun type	Carriage type	Years active	Notes
111	2	16-inch (406 mm) Navy gun MkIIMI	barbette	1944–1947	Prospect Hill/Wilderness Point, guns delivered 1944 but not mounted
215	2	6-inch (152 mm) gun M1903	shielded barbette	1943–1946	Race Point
214	2	6-inch (152 mm) gun M1	shielded barbette	Not armed	Wilderness Point, not armed
Hackleman	2	3-inch (76 mm) gun M1903	pedestal M1903	1944–1946	North Hill, guns from Battery Hackleman, Fort Constitution
AMTB 913	4	90 mm gun	two fixed T3/M3, two towed	1943–1946	In front of Battery Butterfield
AMTB 914	4	90 mm gun	two fixed T3/M3, two towed	1943–1946	Goshen Point (mainland, now Harkness Memorial State Park, New London, CT)
AMTB 915	4	90 mm gun	two fixed T3/M3, two towed	1943–1946	Pine Island (near Avery Point, Groton, Connecticut)
AMTB 916	4	90 mm gun	two fixed T3/M3, two towed	Not built	East Point

The Anti-Motor Torpedo Boat (AMTB) batteries listed show their authorized strength, and actual strength may have varied. All of the 90 mm mounts were designed to be dual-purpose (anti-aircraft and anti-surface). These batteries were also authorized two 40 mm Bofors guns each.

=== Postwar ===
After the war it was soon determined that gun defenses were obsolete. The fort was deactivated in 1947 and abandoned in 1948 with all guns scrapped. In 1949 the Naval Underwater Sound Laboratory established a facility on the island.

== Present ==
All of the larger batteries still exist; Battery 214 was a private residence in the 1990s. The former military airfield is now a civilian airfield. The bolt circle for Battery Dynamite is still in place; it is probably the only bolt circle for a 15-inch (381 mm) dynamite gun remaining. Batteries Butterfield, Barlow, and Dutton were a municipal brush dump in the 1990s. At some point two of the mine-associated buildings were enclosed with a concrete-and-earth bunker; in the 1990s this bunker was used to store turf due to the cool, humid conditions. Most of the administrative garrison buildings still exist and have been repurposed.

== Gallery ==
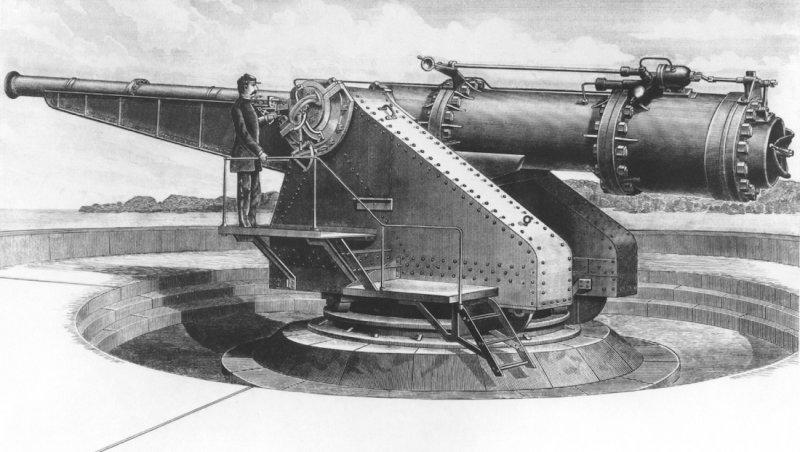
Illustration of a 15-inch (381 mm) dynamite gun, similar to Battery Dynamite

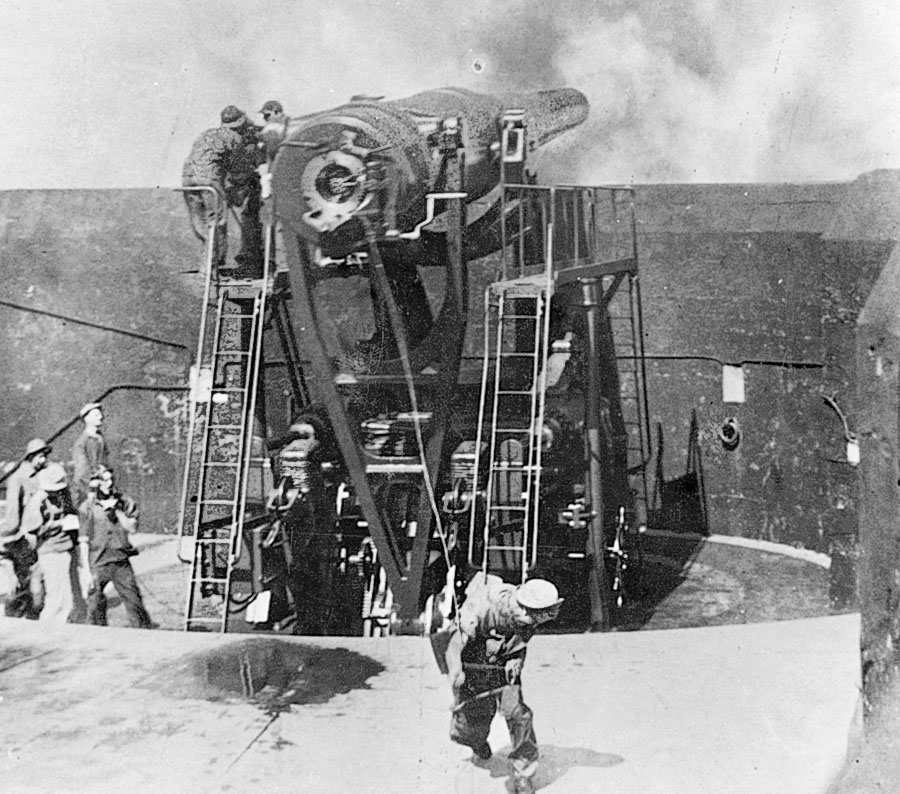
12-inch (305 mm) disappearing gun firing, similar to Battery Butterfield

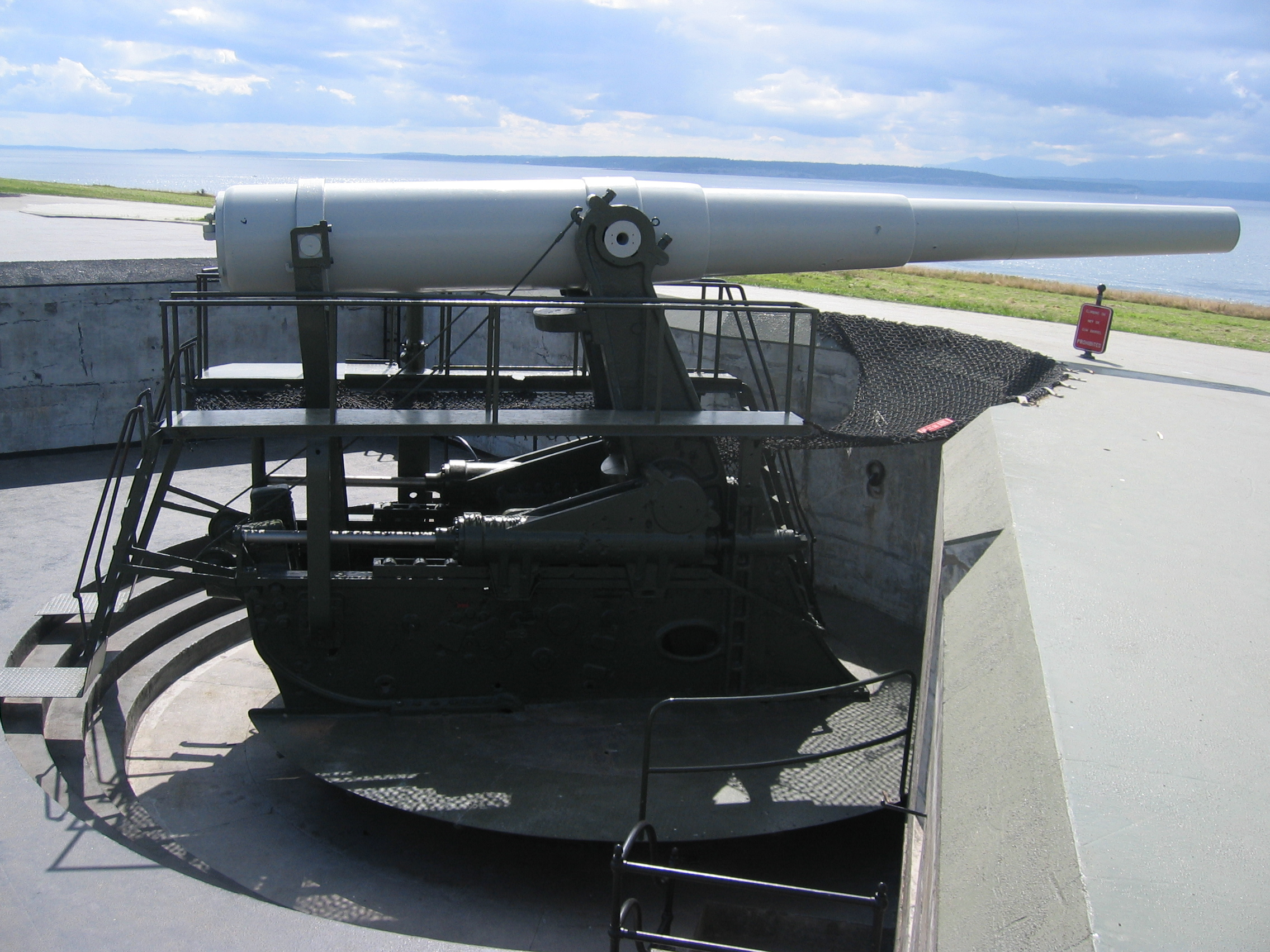
10-inch (254 mm) gun M1895 on disappearing carriage M1901, similar to Battery Barlow

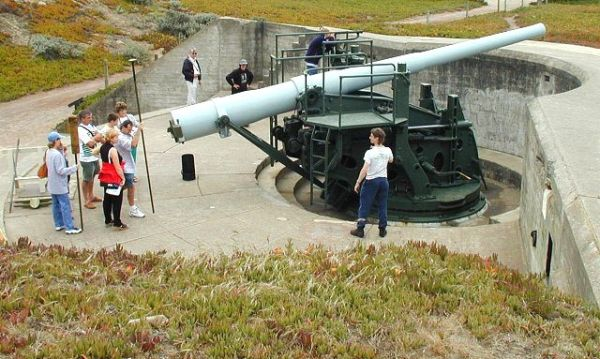
6-inch (152 mm) gun M1905 on disappearing carriage M1903, generally similar to several of Fort H. G. Wright's batteries

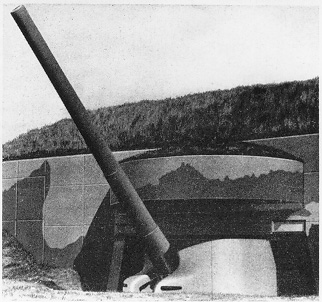
16-inch (406 mm) casemated gun, similar to Battery 111

6-inch (152 mm) gun on shielded barbette carriage, similar to Battery 215

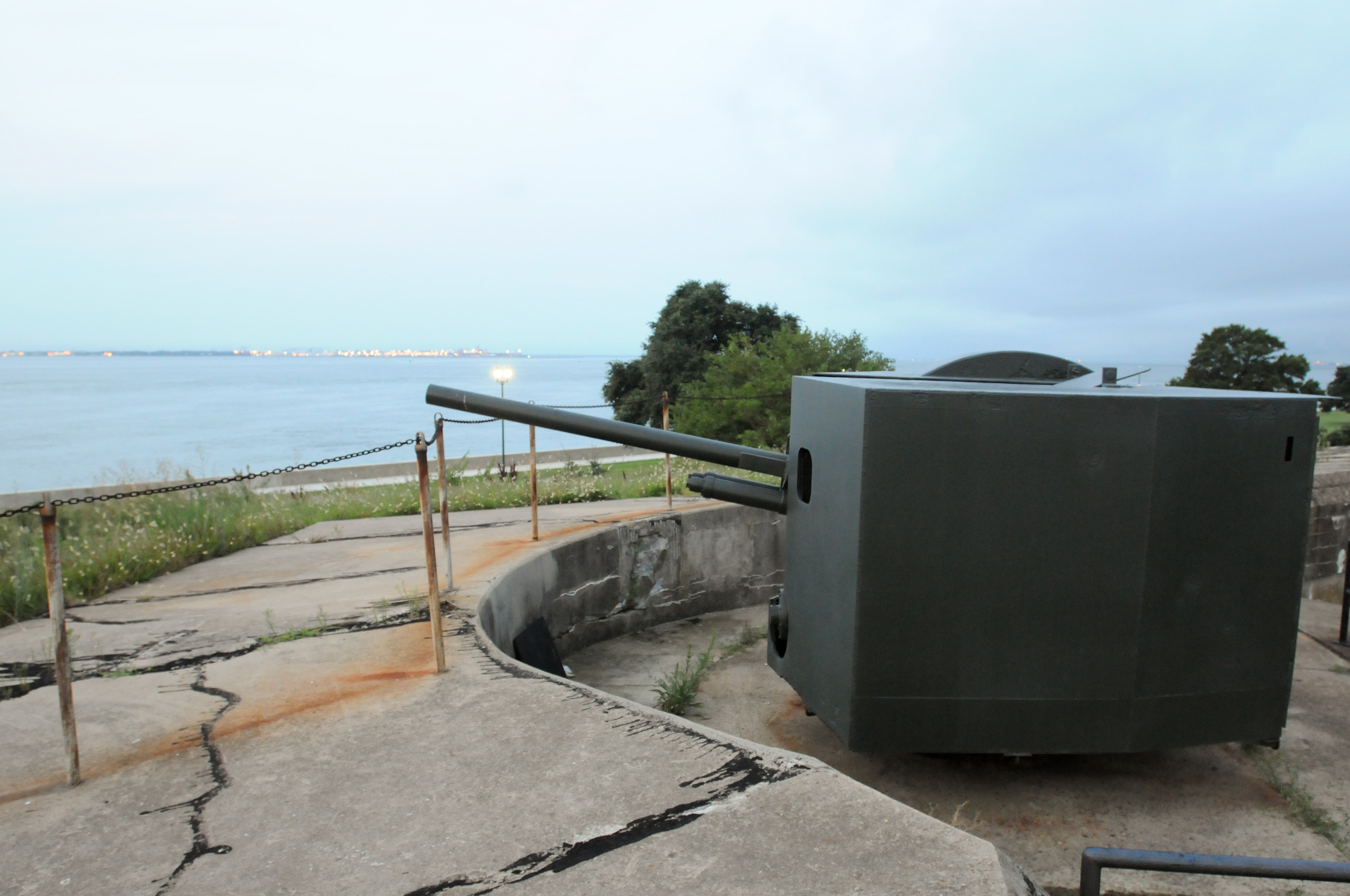
90 mm gun on T3/M3 coast defense mount, similar to AMTB batteries

== See also ==
- 11th Coast Artillery Regiment
- 242nd Coast Artillery Regiment
- Seacoast defense in the United States
- United States Army Coast Artillery Corps
