= Fort Mansfield =

Historic Fort in Westerly, Rhode Island

- Part of Harbor Defenses of Long Island Sound
- Napatree Point, Westerly, Rhode Island
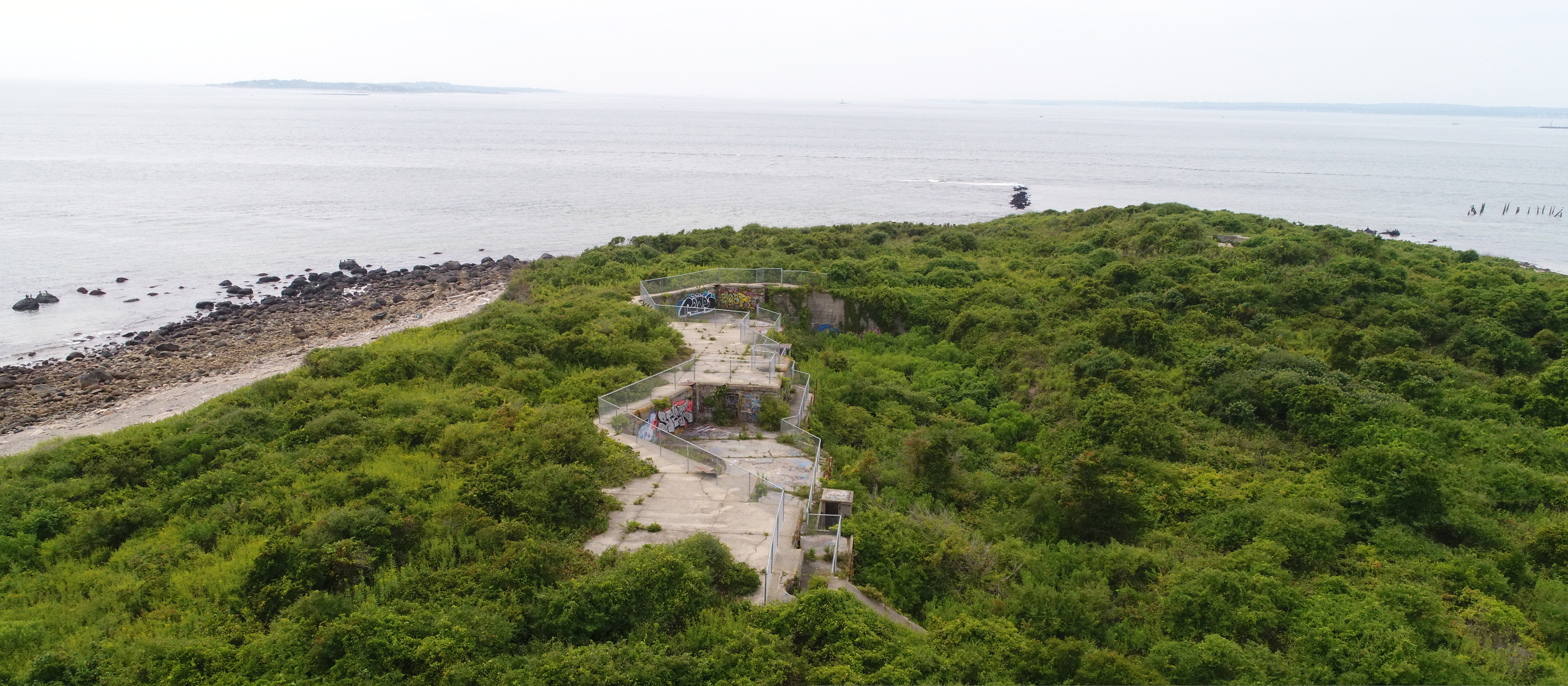
- The remains of Fort Mansfield on Napatree Point.

Site information
- Type: Coastal Defense
- Owner: State of Rhode Island, public beach
- Controlled by: Town of Westerly
- Open to the public: yes

Location
- Location in Rhode Island
- Coordinates: 41°18′23″N 71°53′05″W

Site history
- Built: 1901
- Built by: United States Army
- In use: 1901-1926
- Battles/wars: none

Fort Mansfield was a coastal artillery installation located on Napatree Point, a long barrier beach in the village of Watch Hill in Westerly, Rhode Island, United States.

== History ==
Fort Mansfield and similar forts stretching from Galveston, Texas to Maine can be traced back to a joint Army-Navy Board created in 1883 known as the Gun Foundry Board. Its 1884 report warned of the defenseless condition of the USA's coasts and recommended a system of fortifications to protect harbors and coastal cities from invasion. In 1885, this Board was replaced by what has become known as the Endicott Board which issued formal recommendations for a major coastal defense network in 1886. Fort Mansfield was one of numerous coastal artillery installations constructed in the Harbor Defenses of Long Island Sound as part of the coastal defense network for New York City. It was named in honor of Joseph K. Mansfield (1803–1862), who served as an engineer officer during the Mexican–American War and was eventually promoted to Inspector General of the Army; he was killed at the Battle of Antietam in the Civil War.

=== Construction ===
In 1898, the United States government purchased 60 acres (240,000 m^{2}) on Napatree Point, a long, narrow spit of land jutting out from Watch Hill, Rhode Island. The fort was located on a bend in the spit beyond which was called Sandy Point. Construction of the fort began the following year. When the fort was first occupied in 1901, it was considered a sub-post of Fort Trumbull in New London, Connecticut. But when the fort was staffed to full capacity in 1902, its status changed to an independent battery. The fort's main armament consisted of Battery Wooster, two 8-inch M1888 (203 mm) disappearing guns; Battery Crawford, two 5-inch M1897 guns (127 mm) on balanced pillar carriages; and Battery Connell, two 5-inch M1900 guns on pedestal mounts. The balanced pillar was a type of retractable carriage that soon proved impractical and was disabled in the up position. Battery Wooster was named for David Wooster, a Revolutionary War general who died in the Battle of Ridgefield, Connecticut. Battery Crawford was named for Emmet Crawford, an Army officer killed pursuing Geronimo in 1886. Battery Connell was named for James W. Connell, an Army officer killed in the Philippine–American War.

=== Fatal flaw ===
War games held in 1907 proved that the fort had a fatal flaw. Any attacking vessel could approach Fort Mansfield from a "dead angle" along the Rhode Island coast which the fort's long-range 8 inch cannon did not cover. The installation could be bombarded with impunity, and an invading party could assault the fort opposed by nothing better than small-arms fire, depending on where it landed. A report on the war games stated, "I believe I could capture Ft. Mansfield with a fleet of coal barges, equipped with 6-inch rapid fire guns".

Because of this fatal design flaw, the fort was removed from the list of active coastal artillery posts in 1909 and placed in caretaker status. By 1911, only 18 men were left to man the post. That dropped to six men in 1916, and the guns were removed in 1917 for potential service on the Western Front. That small contingent remained until 1926, when the government placed the land up for sale. One developer proposed that nearby land on Sandy Point be divided into some 674 plots, but the land was purchased by a private syndicate eager to prevent it from being used for "cheap little houses" that might affect the exclusive character of Watch Hill. The sale was finalized in 1928.

=== Demolition ===
All the government buildings were demolished during the winter of 1928–29, leaving the three concrete gun emplacements behind. Batteries Wooster and Crawford survive to this day, although overgrown; but Battery Connell has succumbed to sea erosion, which has pushed the beach back some 200 feet (61 m) since the fort was built. What remains of Connell can sometimes be seen at low tide.

During World War II, a battery of two 16"/50 caliber Mark 2 guns was proposed for the Watch Hill area at the Oak's Inn Military Reservation in Misquamicut, Rhode Island, but it was never built. The Oak's Inn site had a battery of four 155 mm guns on "Panama mounts" from 1942 through 1944.

=== Cleanup ===
In August 2009, a small group of young adults interested in historical preservation began a cleanup project on Fort Mansfield. They found roots to be the major source of cracks and deterioration, so foliage was cut back. The fort's decay has slowed because of the lack of the roots' pressure against the structure.

This project proved beneficial in alleviating some of the stresses upon the fort. In 2011, the Watch Hill Fire Department placed railings along the top edges of the main building. They also placed steel covers blocking the steps, preventing access to the lower level of the site.

== See also ==
- Seacoast defense in the United States
- United States Army Coast Artillery Corps
