= Harbor Defenses of Long Island Sound =

Coordinates: 41°15′23″N 72°01′37″W

- Active: 1900-1950
- Country: United States
- Branch: United States Army Coast Artillery Corps
- Type: Coast artillery
- Role: Harbor Defense Command
- Part of: First Army 1933–1941; Eastern Defense Command 1941–1945
- Garrison/HQ: Fort H. G. Wright, Fishers Island, New York
- Motto: Stop
- Mascot: Oozlefinch

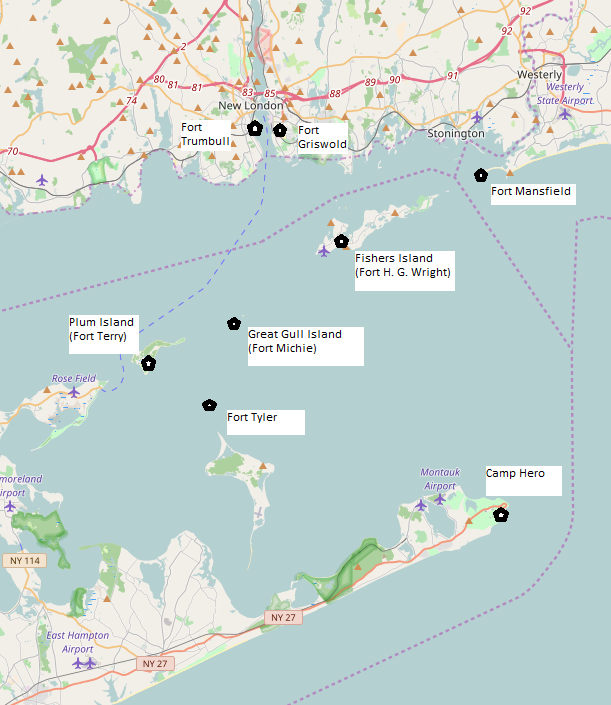
Map of eastern Long Island and southeastern Connecticut showing historical fort locations.

The Harbor Defenses of Long Island Sound was a United States Army Coast Artillery Corps harbor defense command. It coordinated the coast defenses of Long Island Sound and Connecticut from 1895 to 1950, beginning with the Endicott program. These included both coast artillery forts (all but two on islands in the sound) and underwater minefields. The area defended included the approach via the Sound to New York City, the port cities and manufacturing centers of New London, New Haven, and Bridgeport, and eventually included the submarine base and shipyard in Groton. The command originated circa 1900 as an Artillery District, was renamed Coast Defenses of Long Island Sound in 1913, and again renamed Harbor Defenses of Long Island Sound in 1925.

== History ==
=== Early Long Island Sound forts ===
==== Colonial period ====
Connecticut appears to have had few coastal fortifications in the colonial era. Unnamed forts are referred to in New Haven at the site of the later Black Rock Fort (dating from 1657) and in New London at the later Fort Trumbull. The British Fort Saybrook was established at Old Saybrook in 1635, which burned in 1647, but was rebuilt the next year on a new site. It was successful in resisting a Dutch raid in 1675.

==== Revolutionary War ====
Two relatively large and at least four small coastal forts were built in Connecticut during the American Revolutionary War. The larger ones were Fort Trumbull in New London and Fort Griswold in Groton, across the Thames River from Fort Trumbull. Smaller forts were also built in New Haven (Black Rock Fort), in a part of Fairfield called Black Rock that is now in Bridgeport (confusingly also called Fort Black Rock), and at Long Point in Stonington Borough. These were all built 1775–1778. Following a British raid on Stamford in July 1781, Fort Stamford was hastily built there. One source states that Fort Saybrook was also rebuilt in the Revolution.

British and Loyalist (a.k.a. Tory) forces conducted several raids in Connecticut during the war. One was Tryon's raid under William Tryon in July 1779, which attacked New Haven, Fairfield, and Norwalk, with success in burning the latter two towns. The raid also captured New Haven and Black Rock Fort, but a subordinate of Tryon's limited his activities to destruction of military-related stores and ignored orders to burn the city. In Fairfield, Fort Black Rock was besieged but not taken, but was unable to prevent the British from entering the town by another route. The most famous British raid in Connecticut was at New London and Groton under the traitor Benedict Arnold on 6 September 1781. His forces readily captured Fort Trumbull (defended by only 23 men and open on the landward side) and overcame a stiff resistance at Fort Griswold in the Battle of Groton Heights. Contemporary patriot newspaper accounts allege that the British and Loyalist forces massacred many of the defenders of Fort Griswold after their surrender, starting with their commander, Colonel William Ledyard, who it was said was run through with his own sword after surrendering it. The garrison of about 150 suffered 85 killed. The British forces went on to burn the city of New London.

==== 1783-War of 1812 ====
Fort Trumbull was repaired in 1795 and 1799 under the first system of US fortifications, and was repaired in 1808 and rebuilt in 1813 with 18 guns under the second system, during the War of 1812. Fort Griswold received little attention except some repairs in 1794, though it was garrisoned during at least part of the war. The British were able to blockade New London for the duration of the war, keeping three warships under Stephen Decatur bottled up in the Thames River. Decatur had an earthwork fort (named for himself) built on Allyn's Mountain in Gales Ferry, just north of Groton. Black Rock Fort in New Haven was rebuilt as the six-gun Fort Hale in 1809–1812. Various other forts were rebuilt in the War of 1812, some with new names. The most famous action in Connecticut of the War of 1812 was the bombardment of Stonington Borough on 9–12 August 1814. A force of four British warships under Sir Thomas Hardy demanded the town's surrender. The town refused, despite having only two 18-pounder cannon with which to defend itself. Three days of bombardment resulted in one elderly woman killed and a few of the defenders wounded, against reportedly 21 British sailors killed and 50 wounded. Stonington's pair of 18-pounders are preserved in the borough to this day.

==== 1816-1890 ====
Although heavily fortified locations were not attacked in the War of 1812, the British managed to bypass or suppress the weak defenses at the mouth of Chesapeake Bay and burn Washington, DC. As a result, Congress approved a large-scale program of improved masonry forts, later called the third system of US fortifications, to replace the relatively small forts of the first and second systems. Connecticut received a complete rebuild of Fort Trumbull and a rebuilt water battery at Fort Griswold under this program.

The new (and current) Fort Trumbull was built from 1839 to 1850. It was designed by Joseph Totten and built under the supervision of George W. Cullum, both officers of the Army Corps of Engineers. Totten was the leading American fort designer of his day, and Cullum would later become superintendent of the US Military Academy at West Point. Fort Trumbull was built with five sides, three of them facing the water. The main fort could use up to 42 guns on the seacoast fronts, plus flank howitzers in bastions for close-in defense. Two external seacoast batteries added another 10 guns. The two landward fronts had numerous loopholes for muskets, along with cannon on the fort's roof.

The Groton Monument was built near Fort Griswold in 1825–1830 to commemorate the Revolutionary War battle's dead. Fort Griswold's water battery was rebuilt in the 1840s for 20 guns. During the Civil War it was upgraded to accommodate 10-inch Rodman guns.

Forts in Connecticut served as mobilization centers in the Civil War. Fort Trumbull became the headquarters of the 14th US Infantry regiment during the war. Fort Nathan Hale in New Haven was built in 1863 near the old Black Rock Fort as an earthwork mounting 18 guns, with bomb-proof shelters and magazines. In an unusual move, this fort was partially demolished after the war.

The Civil War had shown that masonry forts were vulnerable to modern rifled cannon, particularly in the siege of Fort Pulaski near Savannah, Georgia, in 1862. Also, the 15-inch (381 mm) smoothbore Rodman gun was introduced during the war. New earth-protected batteries were constructed in the 1870s at a number of locations to provide more survivable forts armed with the new weapons. However, Connecticut does not seem to have received any improved fortifications, and the program was terminated in 1878.

=== Endicott period ===
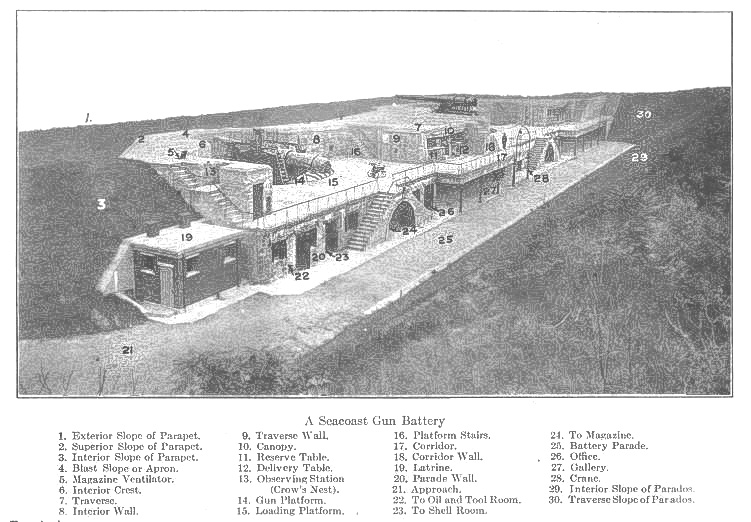
Typical US disappearing gun battery for two guns.

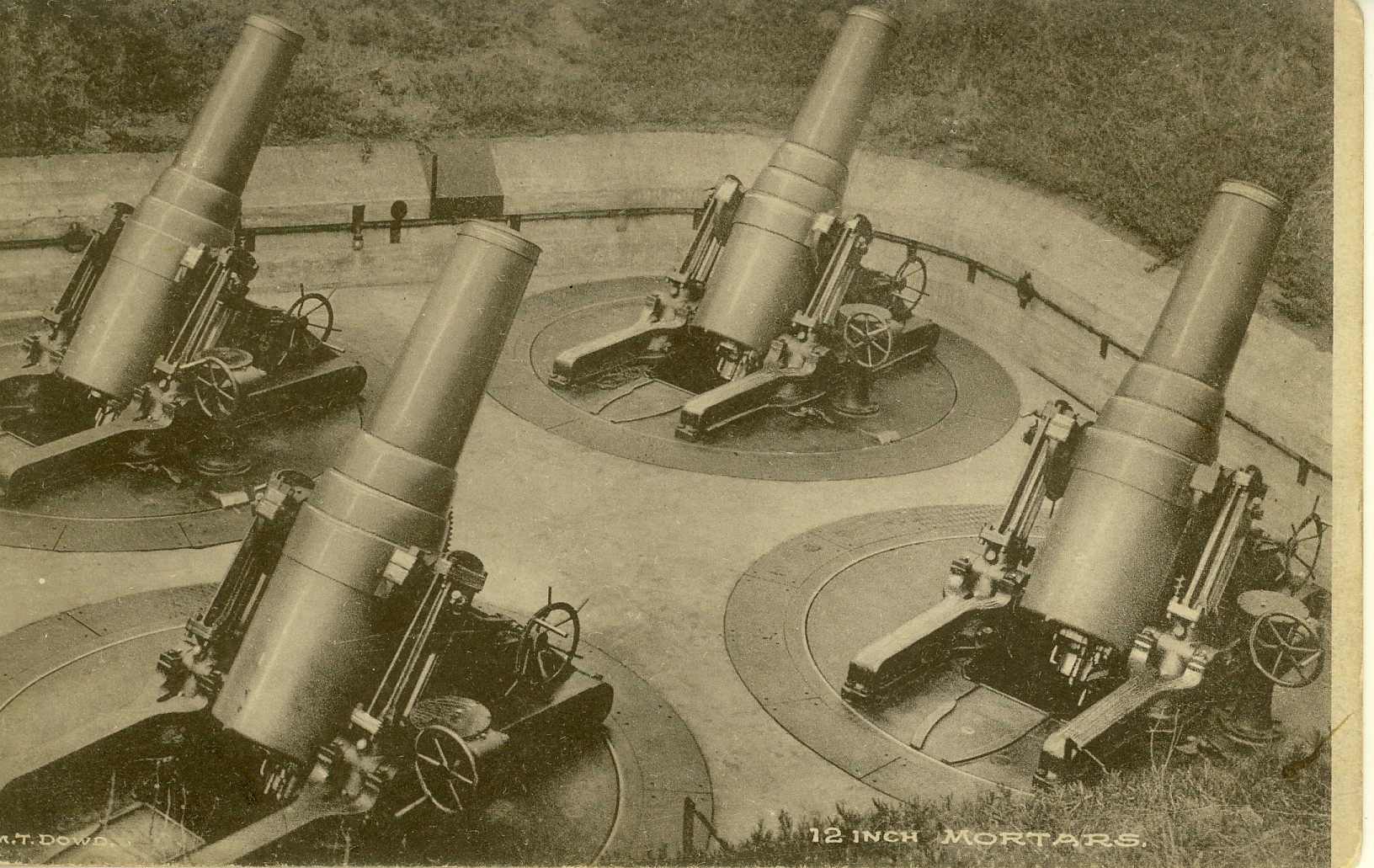
12-inch mortars, similar to those at Fort H. G. Wright and Fort Terry.

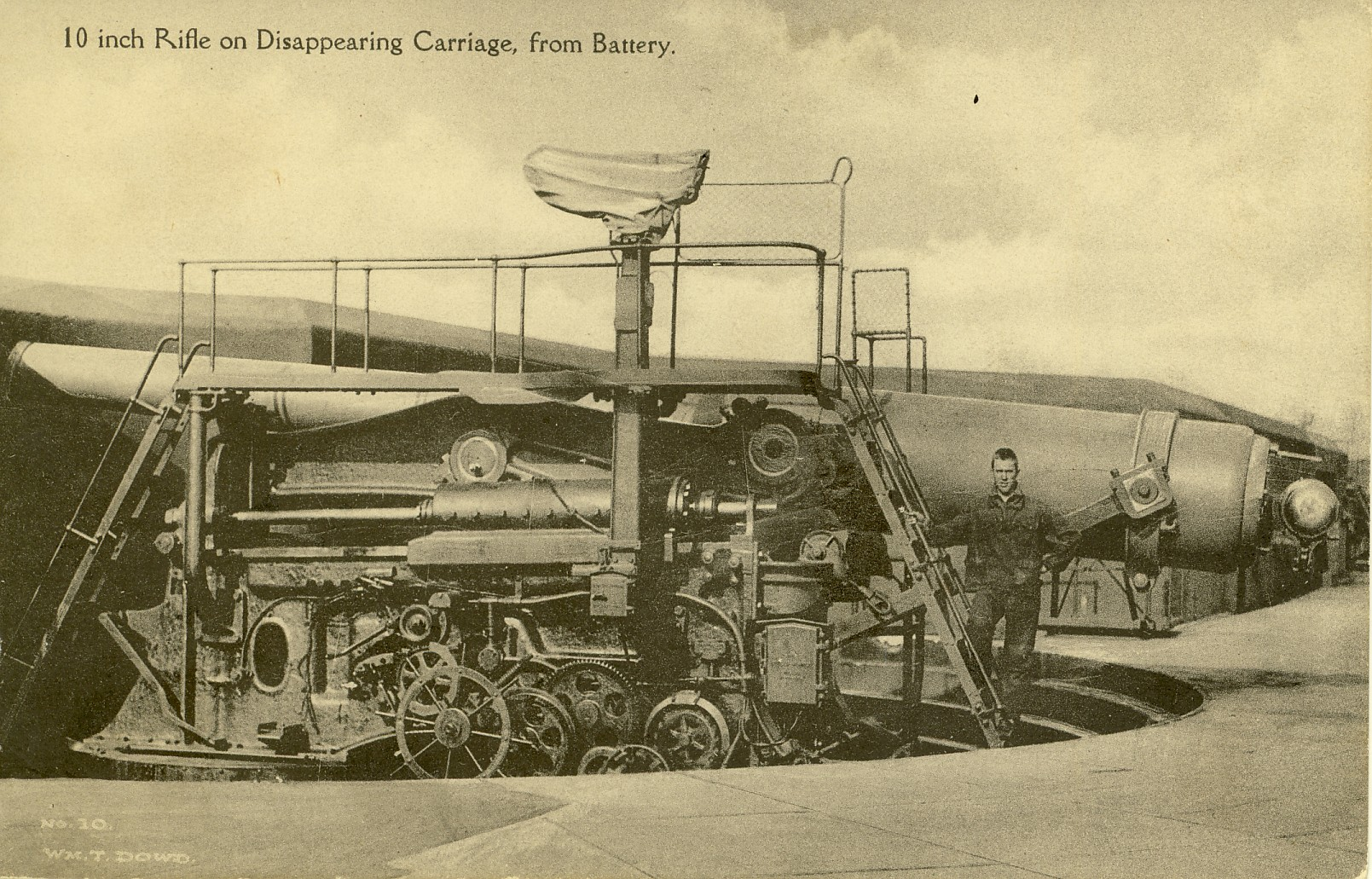
10-inch gun M1888 on disappearing carriage M1896, similar to other large disappearing guns.

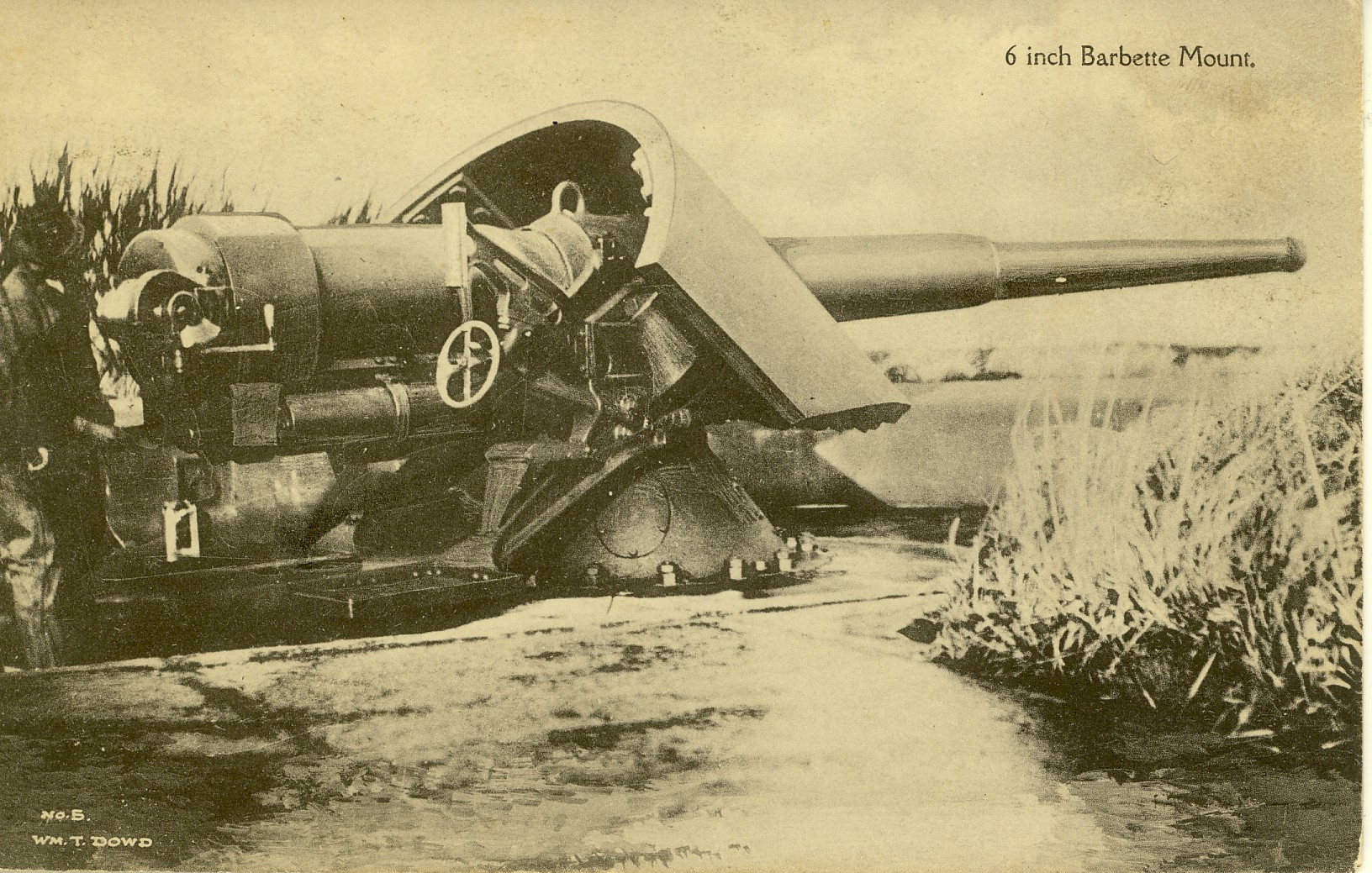
6-inch gun M1900 on pedestal mount M1900. Early 6-inch installations were on disappearing mounts, later installations were on pedestal mounts.

The Board of Fortifications was convened in 1885 under Secretary of War William Crowninshield Endicott to develop recommendations for a full replacement of existing coast defenses. Most of its recommendations were adopted, and construction began in 1897 on new forts to defend Long Island Sound. Initially, three large and one small forts were built. The large forts were Fort H. G. Wright on Fishers Island, Fort Michie on Great Gull Island, and Fort Terry on Plum Island. All three of these forts are in New York state in the town of Southold in Suffolk County, and the islands they are on define the border between Block Island Sound and Long Island Sound. The small fort was Fort Mansfield, on Napatree Point in Westerly, Rhode Island. Two underwater minefields controlled from Fort H. G. Wright and Fort Terry also guarded the Sound. This harbor defense command was one of those in which new fort locations moved seaward (compared to Forts Trumbull and Griswold) as gun ranges increased. Fort Trumbull was the initial headquarters for Long Island Sound's defenses, but in 1910 this shifted to Fort H. G. Wright and Fort Trumbull became the Revenue Cutter Academy.

Heavy weapons included a rare 15-inch (381 mm) dynamite gun at Fort H. G. Wright, along with eight 12-inch (305 mm) mortars and one pair each of 12-inch (305 mm) disappearing guns and 10-inch (254 mm) disappearing guns. Fort Michie had one pair each of 12-inch and 10-inch guns. Fort Terry had eight 12-inch mortars and a pair of 10-inch disappearing guns, along with a pair of 5-inch (127 mm) guns. All of these forts also had between four and seven 6-inch (152 mm) guns and several 3-inch (76 mm) guns to defend the minefields against minesweepers. Fort Mansfield was one of the smallest Endicott forts, with two 8-inch (203 mm) disappearing guns and four 5-inch (127 mm) guns. The initial forts were substantially complete by 1906.

Generally, the heavy batteries were built first, followed by the 3-inch and then the 6-inch batteries. However, the Spanish–American War broke out in early 1898. Most of the Endicott batteries were still years from completion, and it was feared the Spanish fleet would bombard the US east coast. A number of batteries of medium-caliber rapid-fire guns were hastily built, along with batteries of Civil War-era smoothbore Rodman guns. Fort Terry received a single 4.72-inch (120 mm)/45 caliber Armstrong gun, purchased from the United Kingdom. Unusually, in Long Island Sound a new fort was built in response to the situation. This was Fort Tyler on Gardiners Point Island, south of Plum Island. This fort initially had emplacements for two modern 8-inch M1888 guns (203 mm) on modified 1870s Rodman carriages. The fort was later rebuilt to accommodate two 8-inch disappearing guns and two 5-inch guns. However, records do not indicate that the fort was ever armed or garrisoned. Emergency batteries of 10-inch smoothbore Rodman guns included one gun at Fort Long Point in Stonington, six guns at Fort Nathan Hale in New Haven, and four guns at or near the old Black Rock Fort in Bridgeport. The Rodman gun batteries were disarmed shortly after the war in 1899–1900, and Fort Terry's 4.7-inch gun was transferred to the Sandy Hook Proving Ground in 1903. In 1904 the dynamite gun concept was abandoned and Fort H. G. Wright's gun was removed.

Fort Mansfield was intended to guard the strait between Westerly, Rhode Island and Fishers Island. However, an exercise in 1907 showed that the nearby beach could be invaded in a sector the guns could not cover, thus the fort was vulnerable to capture. The fort was placed in caretaker status in 1909 and disarmed to provide guns for World War I in 1917. It was abandoned and sold in 1928.

Naval and related facilities grew in importance in the Long Island Sound area from the Endicott era through World War II. In 1872 the New London Navy Yard was established on the present site of the Naval Submarine Base New London in Groton, Connecticut. The first US Navy submarine base was established circa 1901 on Long Island at New Suffolk, New York, but was disestablished in 1905 with the submarines moving to Newport, Rhode Island. In 1915 submarines returned to the New London area at the base in Groton, and the submarine base there was officially established in 1916. In 1910 the New London Ship and Engine Company, a subsidiary of Electric Boat, was established in Groton to build submarine engines, although US Navy submarines were not built in Groton until 1931. In 1912 the Lake Torpedo Boat Company was established by Simon Lake in Bridgeport to build submarines, lasting until 1924. Connecticut also had several important manufacturing centers in numerous other industries in the 19th and 20th centuries.

In 1911–1914, unusually, Fort H. G. Wright's 10-inch and 12-inch guns were replaced with similar weapons, probably due to their use for live-fire practice. The fort's offshore location allowed its guns to be fired frequently, probably training troops from the entire Northeast.

=== World War I ===
The American entry into World War I brought many changes to the Coast Artillery and the Coast Defenses of Long Island Sound (CD Long Island Sound). Numerous temporary buildings were constructed at the forts to accommodate the wartime mobilization. As the only component of the Army with heavy artillery experience and significant manpower, the Coast Artillery was chosen to operate almost all US-manned heavy and railway artillery in that war. Stateside garrisons were drawn down to provide experienced gun crews on the Western Front, mostly using French- and British-made weapons. Some weapons were removed from forts with the intent of getting US-made artillery into the fight. 8-inch, 10-inch, and 12-inch guns and 12-inch mortars were converted to railway artillery, while 5-inch and 6-inch guns became field guns on wheeled carriages. 12-inch mortars were also removed to improve reload times by reducing the number of mortars in a pit from four to two. Few US Army railway artillery pieces were mounted and few or none saw action before the Armistice. The remounted 5-inch and 6-inch guns were sent to France, but their units did not complete training in time to see action. The 5-inch guns were removed from service in 1920.

By this time, pedestal mounts for 6-inch guns were known to be superior to disappearing mounts, being able to more rapidly track targets with a faster rate of fire. Thus, most disappearing guns (except the M1897, shorter than the others) were dismounted for use as field guns, while most of the few pedestal guns dismounted were returned to the forts soon after the war. The removed 6-inch disappearing guns (primarily M1903 and M1905) were stored and many returned to service in World War II.

As a result of the above policies, in 1917-18 the mortar batteries at Fort H. G. Wright and Fort Terry were halved and all 6-inch M1903 and M1905 guns removed, along with Fort Terry's pair of 5-inch guns (these appear to have been relocated to North Hill at Fort H. G. Wright, along with two other 5-inch guns (most likely from Fort Mansfield), until scrapped in 1919). No 10-inch or 12-inch guns in CD Long Island Sound were removed, possibly due to their use for live-fire practice. Fort Michie's four pedestal-mounted 6-inch M1900 guns remained, along with three M1897 guns at Fort H. G. Wright and two at Fort Terry.

References indicate the authorized strength of CD Long Island Sound in World War I was 38 companies, including 13 from the Connecticut National Guard.

=== Interwar ===
During and after World War I two- or three-gun antiaircraft batteries armed with M1917 3-inch (76 mm) guns on fixed mounts were built at some forts. These batteries were emplaced at all three of the major CD Long Island Sound forts. Some of these weapons remained in service through early World War II; others were replaced by towed 3-inch guns in the 1930s.

During World War I, in response to rapid improvements in dreadnought battleships, the Coast Artillery developed a new weapon, the 16-inch gun M1919 (406 mm). The first of these was deployed at Fort Michie, on an improved disappearing carriage with elevation increased from 15° to 35°. The fort's 10-inch gun battery was demolished and a unique one-gun battery built for the new weapon from 1919 to 1923. However, shortly after developing this carriage, the Coast Artillery's experience in delivering plunging fire with howitzers on the Western Front was used to develop a new barbette carriage with a 65° elevation, thus maximizing the guns' range and exploiting weak deck armor on potential target ships. All subsequent US 16-inch gun installations used the high-angle carriage, and no further disappearing emplacements of any kind were built for the Coast Artillery.

On 1 July 1924 the harbor defense garrisons completed the transition from a company-based organization to a regimental one, and on 9 June 1925 the commands were renamed from "Coast Defenses..." to "Harbor Defenses...". The 11th Coast Artillery was the Regular Army component of HD Long Island Sound from 1 July 1924 through 25 February 1944. The regimental headquarters and headquarters battery and four firing batteries were active at Fort H. G. Wright from 1924 through 1935, when the firing batteries were deactivated and the 1st Battalion of the 11th was activated with three firing batteries. The garrison level was unusually high for the period, because the fort's offshore location made it suitable for frequent live fire practice. The 242nd Coast Artillery was the Connecticut National Guard component of HD Long Island Sound from 14 September 1923 through 7 October 1944.

A coast defense exercise conducted in HD Long Island Sound in 1930 was notable for including aircraft and submarines in the defensive plan. The aircraft were based at Trumbull Field in Groton, CT; the submarines deployed from the nearby Submarine Base New London, also in Groton. Observation, bombardment, and pursuit (fighter) aircraft were included. The submarines had a dual reconnaissance and counter-attack mission; it was determined that these missions should be separated in future.

Fort Trumbull hosted the Revenue Cutter Academy beginning in 1910, which became the United States Coast Guard Academy in 1915. The academy moved to its current location in New London in 1932.

On 21 September 1938 the 1938 New England hurricane severely damaged most of Fort Michie's garrison buildings.

In 1937 Fort H. G. Wright's 10-inch and 12-inch guns were replaced, probably due to live-fire practice; the 10-inch guns by weapons taken from Fort Wetherill in Rhode Island.

=== World War II ===
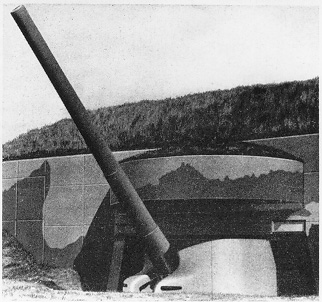
16-inch casemated gun, similar to those at Camp Hero.

Early in World War II numerous temporary buildings were again constructed to accommodate the rapid mobilization of men and equipment. The 2nd Battalion and two additional batteries of the 11th Coast Artillery Regiment were activated on 1 July 1939. Another battery was activated 1 August 1940, with a searchlight battery on 10 February 1941. The 242nd Coast Artillery Regiment was activated on 16 September 1940.

After the Fall of France in 1940 the Army decided to replace all existing heavy coast defense guns with 16-inch guns. HD Long Island Sound became centered on Camp Hero in Montauk on the eastern tip of Long Island. Again, as gun ranges increased the new fort was built further seaward. Camp Hero's batteries were built from 23 March 1942 to June 1943, and were accepted for service on 12 January 1944. Camp Hero had two casemated batteries of two 16-inch (406 mm) guns each, Battery 112 and Battery Dunn a.k.a. Battery 113. The camp was built in great secrecy, and its buildings were arranged randomly so as not to resemble a military installation to enemy reconnaissance or espionage. A third 16-inch battery, Battery 111 at Fort H. G. Wright, had work stopped when mostly complete in November 1943 and the guns were shipped to it, but apparently they were never mounted. A fourth 16-inch battery, Battery 114, was proposed for Fort Terry, then for the Oak's Inn Military Reservation in Misquamicut, Rhode Island, but was never built.

The 16-inch batteries were supplemented by new two-gun 6-inch (152 mm) batteries. These included heavy earth-covered concrete bunkers for ammunition and fire control, with the guns protected by open-back shields. The guns for these batteries were mostly the 6-inch guns removed in World War I for field service and stored since that war; a new 6-inch gun M1 of similar characteristics was developed when this supply of guns began to run out. Four of these batteries were built in HD Long Island Sound: Battery 216 at Camp Hero, Batteries 215 and 214 (not armed) at Fort H. G. Wright, and Battery 217 (not completed) at Fort Terry.

Two 155 mm (6.1 inch) batteries with four guns each were emplaced in HD Long Island Sound in 1942 to quickly provide some defense at key points. These had towed guns on "Panama mounts", circular concrete platforms to support the guns. One battery was at the Oak's Inn Military Reservation in Misquamicut, Rhode Island; the other battery was at Fort Terry. Most batteries of this type were disarmed in 1944, with the threat from surface vessels being negligible.

As the new defenses were built, in 1942-43 the vast majority of the older guns were scrapped, although the 12-inch guns at Fort H. G. Wright and Fort Michie remained until 1945. However, the 6-inch pedestal guns and some of the 3-inch guns were retained in service through the end of the war.

At least five 90 mm gun (3.5 inch) Anti-Motor Torpedo Boat (AMTB) batteries were built in the Long Island Sound area. These had 90 mm dual-purpose (anti-surface and anti-aircraft) guns. Each battery was authorized two 90 mm guns on fixed mounts, two on towed mounts, and two single 40 mm Bofors guns, although the weapons on hand may have varied. These included AMTB 911 at Fort Terry, AMTB 912 at Fort Michie, AMTB 913 and possibly 916 at Fort H. G. Wright, and AMTB 914 and 915 flanking the mouth of the Thames River.

The US Navy also participated in defending the Long Island Sound area with net defenses and submarine-detecting indicator loops, including a station and training school on Fishers Island.

Fort Trumbull served as the Merchant Marine Officers' Training School from 1939 to 1946, providing officers for merchant ships carrying troops and supplies overseas. The fort was also a sonar laboratory during the war, hosting part of Columbia University's Division of War Research, with many of the offices built inside the stone fort. After the war this activity remained at Fort Trumbull as the Naval Underwater Sound Laboratory.

Following mobilization in 1940 HD Long Island Sound was subordinate to First Army. On 24 December 1941 the Eastern Theater of Operations (renamed the Eastern Defense Command three months later) was established, with all east coast harbor defense commands subordinate to it, along with antiaircraft and fighter assets. This command was disestablished in 1946.

On 13 September 1943 the 3rd Battalion of the 242nd Coast Artillery was transferred to the 23rd Coast Artillery in the Harbor Defenses of New Bedford, Massachusetts, and redesignated as part of that regiment. On 4 May 1942 the Harbor Defenses of Long Island Sound were inactivated and consolidated with the Harbor Defenses of New York. HD Long Island Sound was disbanded on 22 May 1944. The removal of most weapons and an Army-wide shift from a regimental to a battalion-based system meant more organizational changes in Long Island Sound's defenses. On 23 February 1944 the 11th Coast Artillery was effectively disestablished, and on 7 October 1944 the 242nd Coast Artillery was redesignated as the 190th and 242nd Coast Artillery Battalions, which themselves were disestablished on 1 April 1945. Personnel from these units were absorbed by HD New York while remaining in the Long Island Sound area.

=== Post World War II ===
Following the war, it was soon determined that gun defenses were obsolete, and they were scrapped by the end of 1948, with remaining harbor defense functions turned over to the Navy. In 1950 the Coast Artillery Corps and all Army harbor defense commands were dissolved. Today the Air Defense Artillery carries the lineage of some Coast Artillery units. As of 2014, in Connecticut the 242nd Engineer Detachment of the Connecticut Army National Guard in Niantic carried the lineage of the 242nd Coast Artillery. In the 1950s rings of Nike missile sites were built around Bridgeport, Hartford, and Providence, RI, but none of the former Long Island Sound coast defense sites were used. These were deactivated circa 1972.

In 1967-72 Fort Nathan Hale and Black Rock Fort were reconstructed and remain open to the public.

Fort Trumbull remained in Navy hands until 1996. The fort soon became a state park, with the offices removed from the gun casemates.

Fort Terry was an Army biological warfare laboratory from 1952 to 1954, at which time it became the Plum Island Animal Disease Center of the US Department of Agriculture.

Fort Michie and Great Gull Island were acquired by the American Museum of Natural History to study migratory terns in 1949, and the program remains in place.

== Present ==
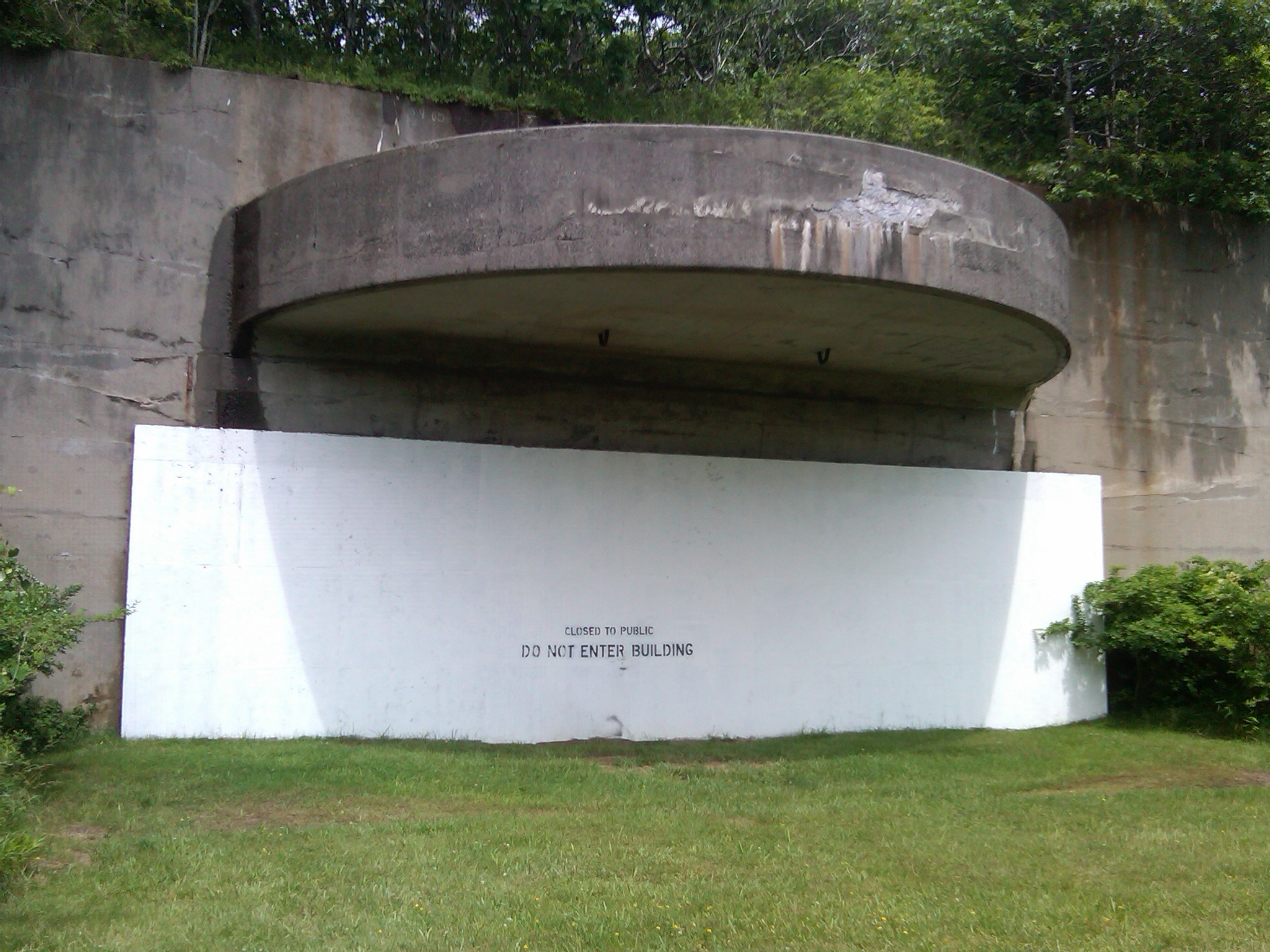
Former 16-inch gun emplacement at Camp Hero.

Fort Trumbull in New London and Fort Griswold (with the adjacent Groton Monument) in Groton are well preserved and restored and are open to the public in state parks. Some historic cannon are at both forts. Fort Trumbull has an elevator allowing access to the upper portions of the fort. The pair of 18-pounders that defended Stonington Borough in the War of 1812 remain on display in a town park.

In New Haven, Fort Nathan Hale and Black Rock Fort are also open to the public. The site of Fort Stamford in Stamford has some remains of the fort. A park is at the site of Fort Saybrook in Old Saybrook, but little or nothing remains of the fort.

Many of the garrison buildings of Fort H. G. Wright on Fishers Island have been repurposed for public or private use; some of the gun batteries have been used as the town brush dump, but others are accessible to the public. The 16-inch Battery 111 is in Navy hands but can be viewed externally. The 6-inch Battery 214 is part of a private residence. Battery 215 remains at the west end of the island, and nearby is the bolt circle for the 15-inch dynamite gun, the only intact emplacement of its type. Fort Michie and its unique 16-inch disappearing emplacement are well preserved, but the island is owned by the American Museum of Natural History to study migratory terns, and can only be visited by prior arrangement. Much of Fort Terry was reused by the Animal Disease Center and the batteries remain intact, but Plum Island's future is uncertain and it currently requires prior arrangement to visit. Fort Tyler was used as a bombing range in World War II; its island is little more than a sandbar and has shifted, thus severely damaging the fort. Camp Hero is well preserved with several fire control towers, some disguised as seaside cottages. The 16-inch batteries can be viewed externally. Fort Mansfield remains at the end of Napatree Point in Westerly, Rhode Island, but part of it has succumbed to beach erosion.

== Coat of arms ==
- Blazon
  - Shield: The shield is gold, and bears a blue diagonal stripe, known as a bend, on which are three silver towers. The bend with its towers represents the defenses' line of three forts, Wright, Michie, and Terry, placed diagonally across the entrance of the Sound. On each side of the bend is a narrow parallel strip of black, symbolizing the iron defenses.
  - Crest: The crest is the head of a fish hawk (or osprey) in natural colors, which bird abounds in that vicinity.
  - Motto: The motto is a command to the enemy, Stop.
- Background: The coat of arms was initially approved in 1919 for the Coast Defenses of Long Island Sound. In 1924 the osprey head crest was adopted by the 11th Coast Artillery Regiment.

== See also ==
- Seacoast defense in the United States
- Harbor Defense Command
- List of coastal fortifications of the United States
