= 56th Air Defense Artillery Regiment =

56th Air Defense Artillery
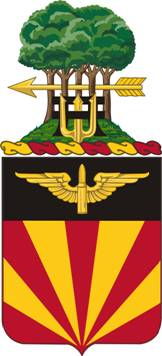
- Coat of arms
- Active: 1921
- Country: United States
- Branch: Army
- Role: Air defense artillery Maneuver Short Range Air Defense (MSHORAD)
- Size: Regiment
- Garrison/HQ: Fort Hood
- Motto: "Night Hides Not"
- Colors: Scarlet
- Mascot: Nighthawks
- Decorations: Presidential Unit Citation with oak leaf cluster Meritorious Unit Commendation

Insignia
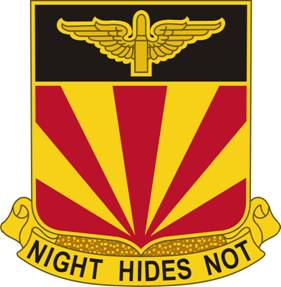
- Distinctive unit insignia

The 56th Air Defense Artillery is a training regiment in the United States Army.

== History ==
This number has had two lineages started under it. A 1917 unit that served in France during World War I and in the Americas during World War II, and the 506th Artillery (AA) CAC, which was renumbered in December 1940. After the renumbering a separate lineage was again started for the 506th CA in 1943.

The 56th Artillery (Coast Artillery Corps) (C.A.C.) was organized on 1 December 1917 from existing Regular Army units and Connecticut National Guard companies from the Harbor Defenses of Long Island Sound. Moved to the Western Front in France March 1918. Armed with 24 155 mm guns purchased from the French and towed by Holt tractors. Served in the 31st Artillery Brigade, including support of III Army Corps and V Army Corps. Returned to the US January 1919, and moved to Camp Jackson, South Carolina. National Guard companies demobilized early 1919 at Fort Schuyler, New York.

Reactivated on 2 June 1941 as the 56th Coast Artillery Regiment (155 mm gun) (Mobile) at Fort Cronkhite, California in the Harbor Defenses of San Francisco (see below).

== Lineage ==
Constituted 29 July 1921 in the OR as the 506th Artillery (AA) CAC and allotted to Sixth Corps Area. The 506th Arty was organized at La Crosse, Wisconsin, in August 1922 and redesignated 506th CA (AA) Regt 20 February 1924. Withdrawn from OR and allotted to RA as inactive 1 October 1933.

The 506th CA redesignated 56th Coast Artillery (TD) Regt (Inactive) 16 December 1940.

- The 56th CA was activated 2 June 1941 at Fort Cronkhite. The 56th CA was to be composed of HHB, 1st, 2nd, & 3rd Bn HHBs, six firing batteries (A-F), and Battery G Search Light (SL). Activation continued into October 1941 with 1st, 2nd, and 3rd Bns organized. By December, the decision had been made to inactivate the regiment as no longer required, and the process began with reassignment of personnel.

However, the inactivation was halted and the regiment was deployed to South America. HHB 2nd Bn, Btrys C & D, and detachments from Btrys A, B, E, & F were designated for Chile, Peru, and Venezuela. Half of the 2nd Bn HHB, Btry C, and a SL Section of Btry G departed Ft. Cronkhite 2-10-42 for the New Orleans Port of Embarkation and Venezuela, arriving 3–2–42. The other half of HHB 2nd Bn, Btry D, and 2nd Plt, Btry G, departed Ft. Cronkhite for Peru 2-18-42 via the San Francisco POE, arriving 3–2–42. A provisional detachment of personnel from Btrys A, B, E, and F were attached to the 2nd Bn and deployed to Chile. Soon after the detached elements of the 56th CA has established themselves in South America, the decision was made 4-1-42 to transfer the personnel to newly reconstituted 58th CA (155mm) Regt and transfer the components of the 56th CA in South America back to Ft. Cronkhite (less personnel and equipment), where the 56th was being reorganized with new personnel.

The remaining elements of the 56th CA Regt in HDSF continued to man 155 mm guns at Ft. Cronkhite and Drakes Bay. The regiment served in the Northern California Sector of the Western Defense Command until September, when 3rd Bn and Btry D of 2nd Bn, with 3rd Plt, Btry G, were assigned to Southern California Sector. The battalions of the 56th remained at Ft. Cronkhite during the summer of 1942 while being reorganized. The rebuilt 2nd Bn, Btrys C & D, remained at Ft. Cronkhite until the late summer of 1942, when it was temporarily ordered to Temporary Harbor Defenses of Grays Harbor, WA. On 9-27-42, 2nd Bn (less Btry D) arrived at Westport, WA. Orders were received mid-September 1942, to move 3rd Bn, 56th CA, (Btrys E & F with Btry D attached) to the Southern California Sector, WDC. On 10-1-42, the reinforced 3rd Bn, 56th CA, was permanently reassigned to Southern California Sector. On 4-6-43, HHB at Ft. Cronkhite was reassigned to the Southern California Sector as well. One detachment of HHB was assigned to 3rd Bn command post at Ventura, the other platoon to HD Los Angeles. On 1-11-44, Southern California Sector ordered all elements of the regiment in the sector to Ft. Cronkhite. HHB, Btry G, and Medical Det. were ordered to Camp Cooke, CA, and disbanded 2-11-44. At Ft. Cronkhite, 1st Bn was redesignated 44th CA Bn (155 mm), 2nd Bn as 45th CA Bn (155 mm), and 3rd Bn as 48th CA Bn, 1-22-44.

== Distinctive unit insignia ==
- Description

A Gold color metal and enamel device 1 3/16 inches (3.02 cm) in height overall consisting of a shield blazoned: Gules, four searchlight beams radiant from middle base Or; on a chief Sable a winged projectile of the second. Attached below the shield a Gold scroll inscribed "NIGHT HIDES NOT" in Black letters.

- Symbolism

The shield is red for Artillery. The searchlight beams and the winged projectile denote the character of the parent organization (506th Coast Artillery)(AA), while the winged projectile on the black chief alludes to the motto "Night Hides Not," signifying that the night does not hide the enemy from the artillery fire of 506th Coast Artillery, from which this unit descended.

- Background

The distinctive unit insignia was originally approved for the 506th Coast Artillery (AA), Organized Reserves on 12 March 1929. It was redesignated for the 56th Coast Artillery on 30 October 1941. It was redesignated for the 56th Field Artillery Battalion on 29 December 1950. The insignia was redesignated for the 56th Artillery Regiment on 19 December 1958. It was redesignated effective 1 September 1971, for the 56th Air Defense Artillery Regiment.

== Coat of arms ==
=== Blazon ===
- Shield

Gules, four searchlight beams radiant from middle base Or; on a chief Sable a winged projectile of the second.

- Crest

On a wreath Or and Gules, on a mound Vert a hurst of five trees Proper, the holes interlaced with an arrow fesswise Or and issuant in base a trident of the first surmounting and interlacing a Torii Sable. Motto NIGHT HIDES NOT.

=== Symbolism ===
- Shield

The shield is red for Artillery. The searchlight beams and the winged projectile denote the character of the parent organization (506th Coast Artillery)(AA), while the winged projectile on the black chief alludes to the motto "Night Hides Not," signifying that the night does not hide the enemy from the artillery fire of 506th Coast Artillery, from which this unit descended.

- Crest

The crest commemorates the award of the Distinguished Unit Citation given the organization in World War II for Hurtgen Forest by the hurst of trees and the arrow. The trident and Torii allude to the Presidential Unit Citation (Navy) awarded the organization for action in Inchon during the Korean War.

=== Background ===
The coat of arms was originally approved for the 506th Coast Artillery (AA), Organized Reserves on 12 March 1929. It was redesignated for the 56th Coast Artillery and amended to delete the crest of the Organized Reserves on 30 October 1941. It was redesignated for the 56th Field Artillery Battalion on 29 December 1950. The insignia was redesignated for the 56th Artillery Regiment on 19 December 1958. It was amended to add the crest on 30 March 1966. The coat of arms was redesignated effective 1 September 1971, for the 56th Air Defense Artillery Regiment.

== Campaign streamers ==
World War II Korea Vietnam

== Current units ==
- 1st Battalion 56th Air Defense Artillery Regiment (United States)
- 2nd Battalion 56th Air Defense Artillery Regiment (United States)
- 3rd Battalion 56th Air Defense Artillery Regiment (United States)
- 4th Battalion 56th Air Defense Artillery Regiment (United States)
- 5th Battalion 56th Air Defense Artillery Regiment (United States)
- 6th Battalion 56th Air Defense Artillery Regiment (United States)

== See also ==
- United States Army Air Defense Artillery School
- Distinctive unit insignia (U.S. Army)
