= Fort Michie =

Fort in New York state

- Part of Harbor Defenses of Long Island Sound
- Great Gull Island, Southold, New York

Site information
- Type: Coastal Defense
- Owner: American Museum of Natural History
- Controlled by: private
- Open to the public: by appointment

Location
- Location in New York
- Coordinates: 41°12′08″N 72°07′07″W

Site history
- Built: 1897-1908
- Built by: United States Army
- In use: 1900-1946
- Battles/wars: World War I World War II

Garrison information
- Garrison: 11th Coast Artillery Regiment

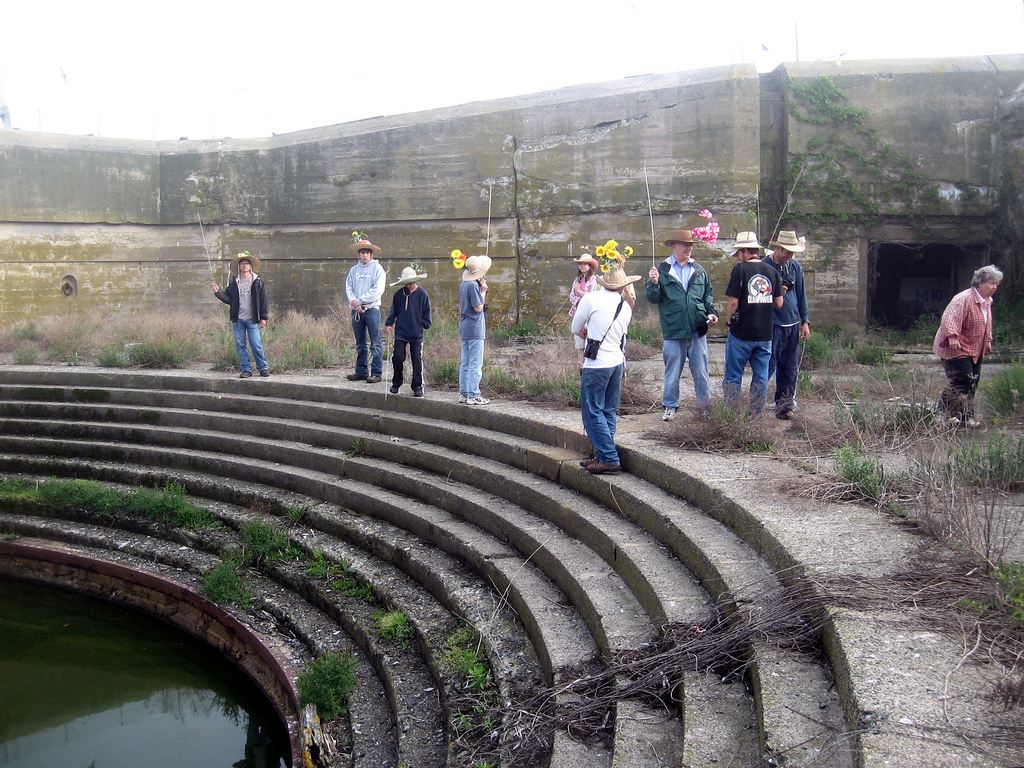
Abandoned gun pit for the unique 16-inch disappearing gun at Fort Michie.

Fort Michie was a United States Army coastal defense site on Great Gull Island, New York. Along with Fort H. G. Wright, Fort Terry, and Camp Hero, it defended the eastern entrance to Long Island Sound as part of the Harbor Defenses of Long Island Sound, thus defending Connecticut's ports and the north shore of Long Island.

The fort was named after First Lieutenant Dennis Michie, who was killed at San Juan Hill during the Spanish–American War. Michie is also known for being the first person to bring football to the United States Military Academy by organizing the first Army–Navy Game, where the football stadium is also named after him.

The fort was first developed at the turn of the 20th century and was active in World War I and World War II. After World War II it was deactivated as a coast defense fort. Since the 1950s the island has been used by the American Museum of Natural History to study migratory terns.

== History ==
=== Construction and armament ===
Fort Michie was built as part of the large-scale Endicott Program, which recommended a comprehensive replacement of existing coast defenses. The forts were designed and built by the Army Corps of Engineers, the weapons were designed by the Army Ordnance Corps, and the forts were (by 1907) garrisoned by the Coast Artillery Corps. Construction of gun batteries at Fort Michie began in 1897. By 1908 the following batteries were completed:

Name	No. of guns	Gun type	Carriage type	Years active
Palmer	2	12-inch gun M1895	disappearing M1897	1900-1945
North	2	10-inch gun M1888	disappearing M1896	1900-1917
Benjamin	2	6-inch gun M1900	pedestal M1900	1908-1947
Maitland	2	6-inch gun M1900	pedestal M1900	1908-1947
Pasco	2	3-inch gun M1903	pedestal M1903	1905-1933

=== World War I ===
Following the American entry into World War I in April 1917, changes were made at the stateside forts with a view to putting some coast artillery weapons into the fight on the Western Front. Battery North's pair of 10-inch guns was dismounted in August 1917 for potential use as railway artillery, but the guns did not leave the island during the war.

=== Between the wars ===
During World War I the new 16-inch gun M1919 was developed, at the time the most powerful weapon in the United States' arsenal. The first of these was deployed at Fort Michie on a unique version of the Buffington-Crozier disappearing carriage, with the elevation increased to 30 degrees and a rare all-around-fire emplacement. This was the largest gun emplacement constructed to date by the United States. It was named for John Moore Kelso Davis, a general and Civil War veteran who died in 1920. Battery North's guns were shipped to storage and the battery demolished to make room for the new gun emplacement, which was built 1919-1922. Other weapon transfers took place at Fort Michie between the wars. In 1930 a 12-inch gun of Battery Palmer was dismounted to replace a gun at Fort H. G. Wright; it was replaced by a gun of the same model the following year. In 1933 the pair of 3-inch guns in Battery Pasco were sent to Fort Mills on Corregidor in the Philippines; these guns were not replaced. Many of the fort's administrative buildings were destroyed in the 1938 New England Hurricane; the fort was probably in caretaker status at the time with a minimal garrison.

=== World War II ===
In 1940, when the United States reviewed its coast defense needs in earnest, Fort Michie was relegated to a secondary role. The fort lacked protection against air attack, and even its 16-inch gun had a relatively short range due to the obsolescent disappearing carriage. New long-range carriages for 16-inch guns were developed about the time Fort Michie's emplacement was built. However, due to the need for a garrison of almost 500 men, numerous temporary buildings were constructed in early 1941. The defense of Long Island Sound centered on building two batteries of two 16-inch guns each at Camp Hero in Montauk, with a third battery at Fort H. G. Wright on Fishers Island that stopped just short of completion. In 1944, with the batteries at Camp Hero complete, Battery Davis was taken out of service; Battery Palmer followed soon after. The only battery built at Fort Michie during the war was Anti-Motor Torpedo Boat battery (AMTB) 912 in 1943, with four 90 mm guns on dual-purpose mounts, two fixed and two towed.

=== Postwar ===
In 1946 Fort Michie was disarmed and all its guns scrapped; it was abandoned in 1948. The American Museum of Natural History acquired the island in 1949 to study migratory terns, which it has continued to this day.

== See also ==
- Seacoast defense in the United States
- United States Army Coast Artillery Corps
