= Oak's Inn Military Reservation =

Former coastal defense site located in Misquamicut, Rhode Island

- Part of Harbor Defenses of Long Island Sound
- Misquamicut, Rhode Island
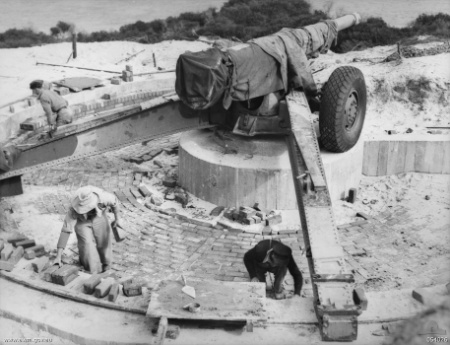
- A 155 mm gun, similar to those at Oak's Inn, on a Panama mount.

Site information
- Type: Coastal Defense
- Owner: private
- Controlled by: United States Army
- Open to the public: no

Location
- Coordinates: 41°20′00″N 71°48′21″W

Site history
- Built: 1942
- Built by: United States Army
- In use: 1942–1944
- Demolished: Panama Mounts and Officers Quarters razed 2008
- Battles/wars: World War II

Oak's Inn Military Reservation was a coastal defense site located in Misquamicut, Rhode Island in the town of Westerly, overlooking Misquamicut State Beach. It was part of the Harbor Defenses of Long Island Sound. Today, the site is a residential development.

== History ==
Oak's Inn Military Reservation was built adjacent to the inn of the same name in 1942. The site had four "Panama mounts" (circular concrete platforms) for four towed 155 mm (6.1 inch) guns. A battery of two 16-inch (406 mm) guns (Battery Construction Number 114) was proposed for this location but not built. The reservation was deactivated in 1944.

=== Present ===
The inn was demolished in the 1950s and the Panama Mounts and Officers' Quarters were demolished in 2008 for a new housing development.

== See also ==
- Seacoast defense in the United States
- United States Army Coast Artillery Corps
