= 5-inch gun M1897 =

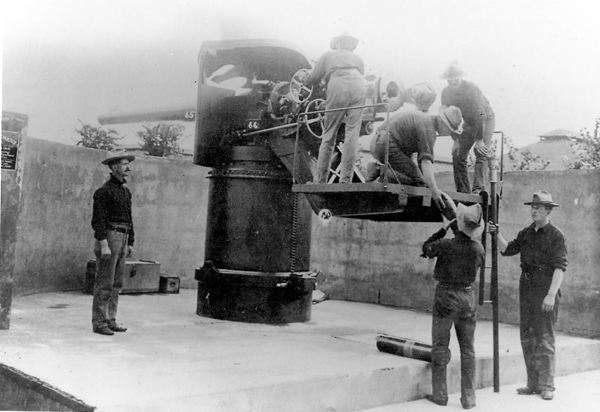
- 5-inch gun M1897 on balanced pillar mount M1896
- Type: Coastal artillery, Field gun
- Place of origin: United States

Service history
- In service: 1897–1920
- Used by: United States Army
- Wars: World War I

Production history
- Designer: Watervliet Arsenal
- Designed: 1897
- Manufacturer: Watervliet Arsenal; Bethlehem Steel
- No. built: 70 total; 35 M1897; 35 M1900; 52 coast defense emplacements
- Variants: M1897, M1900

Specifications
- Mass: M1897: 7,583 pounds (3,440 kg); M1900: 11,120 pounds (5,040 kg)
- Barrel length: M1897: 45 calibers, 225 inches (5.7 m) bore length; M1900: 50 calibers, 250 inches (6.4 m) bore length
- Shell: Bagged charge, separate loading, 59 lb (27 kg) shell, 22.25 lb (10.09 kg) powder
- Caliber: 5 inch (127 mm)
- Breech: Interrupted screw, De Bange type
- Recoil: Hydro-spring
- Carriage: M1896 balanced pillar; M1903 pedestal; most carriages manufactured by Watertown Arsenal
- Elevation: 40° (field carriage)
- Traverse: balanced pillar: 360° (varied with emplacement) pedestal: 360° (varied with emplacement)
- Maximum firing range: M1900: 12,918 yards (11,812 m)
- Feed system: hand

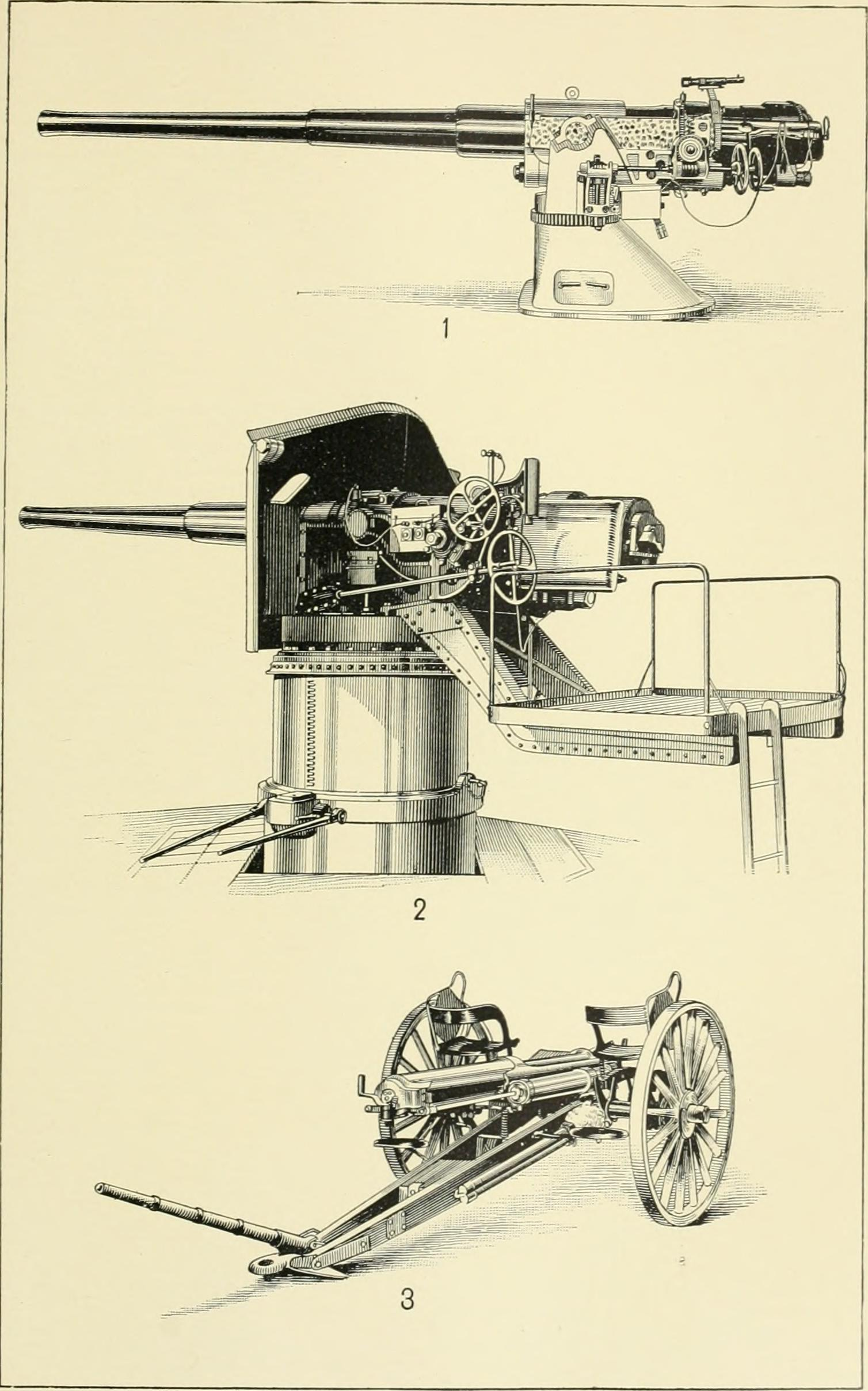
5-inch gun M1897 on balanced pillar mount M1896 (middle).

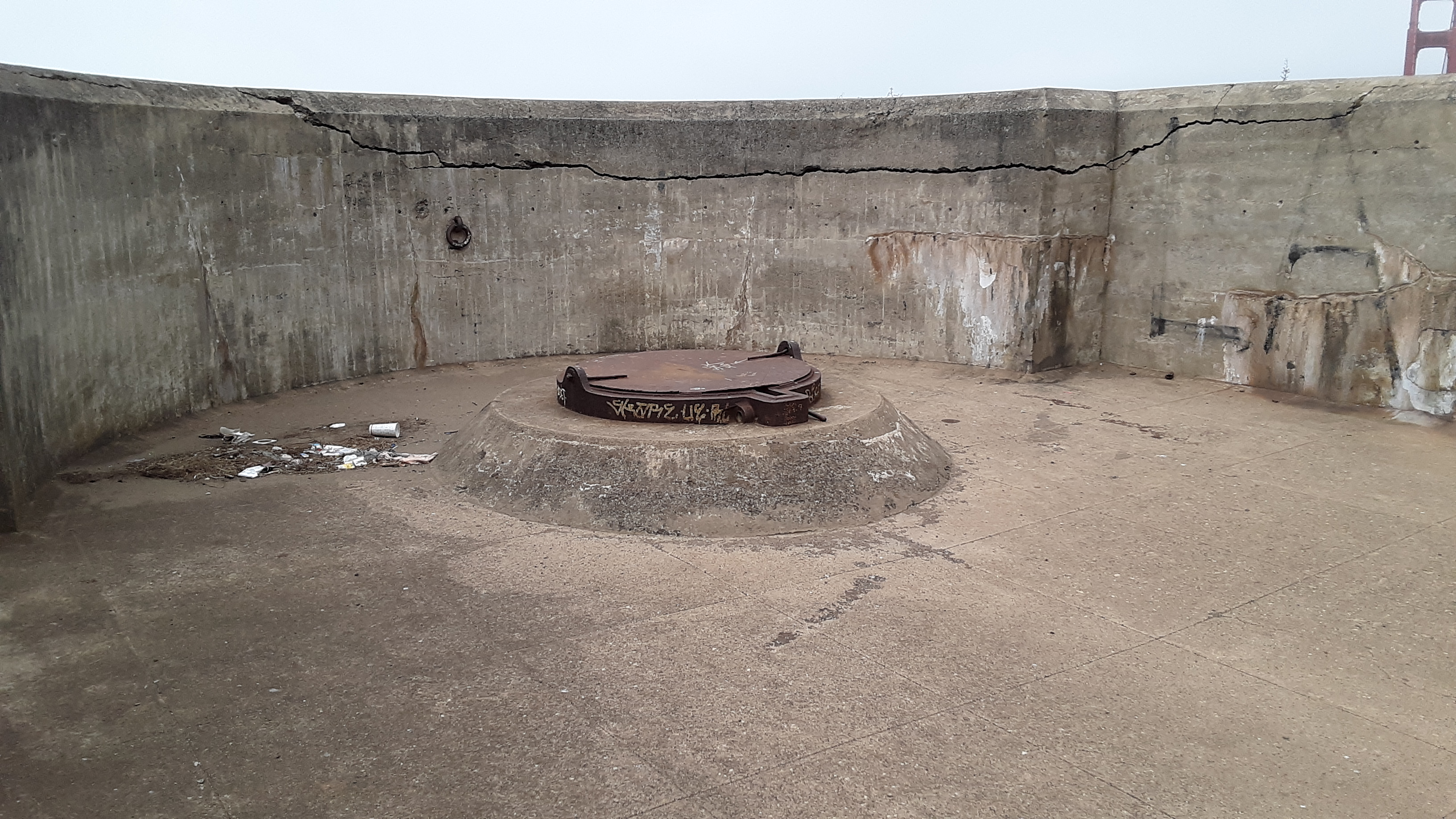
Balanced pillar emplacement for 5-inch gun M1897, Battery Boutelle, Fort Scott, Presidio of San Francisco. Photographed in 2019.

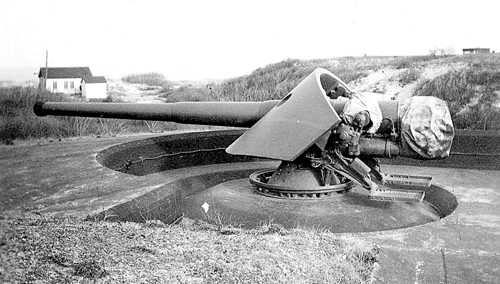
6-inch gun M1900 on pedestal mount M1900, generally similar to the 5-inch gun M1900 on pedestal mount M1903.

The 5-inch gun M1897 (127 mm) and its variant the M1900 were coastal artillery pieces installed to defend major American seaports between 1897 and 1920. For most of their history they were operated by the United States Army Coast Artillery Corps. They were installed on balanced pillar (a form of disappearing carriage) or pedestal (a.k.a. barbette) mountings; generally the M1897 was on the balanced pillar mounting and the M1900 was on the pedestal mounting. All of these weapons were scrapped within a few years after World War I.

== History ==
In 1885, William C. Endicott, President Grover Cleveland's Secretary of War, was tasked with creating the Board of Fortifications to review seacoast defenses. The findings of the board illustrated a grim picture of existing defenses in its 1886 report and recommended a massive $127 million construction program of breech-loading cannons, mortars, floating batteries, and submarine mines for some 29 locations on the US coastline. Most of the Board's recommendations were implemented. US coast artillery fortifications built between 1885 and 1905 are often referred to as Endicott Period fortifications. The 5-inch caliber was chosen, as in many applications, for combining a relatively heavy shell with rapid hand loading. In the overall system, it was an intermediate caliber between the heavy 8-inch, 10-inch, and 12-inch weapons and the small 3-inch guns intended to defend minefields against minesweepers. The 5-inch gun appears to have been developed shortly before the more widely deployed 6-inch gun M1897 and its variants; many harbor defenses included both weapons. The Watervliet Arsenal designed the guns and built the barrels. Initially, most of the guns were mounted on balanced pillar carriages; the gun was kept in a retracted position except while firing. Unlike the concurrent disappearing carriages for 6-inch and larger guns, the gun could only be retracted at one train angle. This meant that it was visible throughout any period of firing. Within a few years, it was realized that the balanced pillar carriage provided no real advantage, and the M1903 low-profile pedestal mount was designed while most balanced pillar mounts were replaced with pedestals. A one-pounder single-shot subcaliber weapon was provided for training with the 5-inch gun.

Under the Endicott program, 52 5-inch guns were emplaced in the United States, 32 on M1896 balanced pillar carriages and 20 on M1903 pedestal mounts.

=== World War I ===
After the American entry into World War I, the Army recognized the need for large-caliber guns for use on the Western Front. The Coast Artillery operated all US Army heavy artillery in that war, due to their experience and training with these weapons. A total of 28 5-inch coast defense guns were removed from fixed emplacements and mounted on M1917 wheeled carriages as field guns; these equipped a Coast Artillery regiment in France, the 69th. All of these were probably M1897 weapons. However, due to the Armistice, the regiment did not complete training in time to see action, and reportedly never received ammunition. None of the 5-inch guns were returned to coast defenses. In June 1919, after the Treaty of Versailles was signed, the field carriages for the 5-inch guns were declared obsolete and scrapped.

Following World War I a number of gun types deployed in small numbers were scrapped, including all of the remaining coast defense 5-inch guns. Some were donated to local governments for use as war memorials; at least seven of these remain.

== Surviving examples ==
At least seven Army 5-inch guns remain as war memorials:

- One 5-inch gun M1897, Bethlehem No. 16, Memorial Park, Woodstown, NJ (formerly at Battery Shipp, Fort Caswell, NC)
- One 5-inch gun M1897, Bethlehem No. 21, Veterans' Memorial Park, Mahoning Ave., Warren, OH (formerly at Battery Wagner, Fort Baker, Marin County, CA)
- One 5-inch gun M1897, Bethlehem No. 13, Valley Forge Military Academy and College, Wayne, PA (formerly at Battery Bell, Fort Schuyler, NY)
- One 5-inch gun M1897, Bethlehem No. Unk., Indiana, PA
- One 5-inch gun M1897, Bethlehem No. 3, Virginia War Museum, Newport News, VA (formerly at Battery Boutelle, Fort Winfield Scott, San Francisco, CA)
- One 5-inch gun M1897, Bethlehem No. 22, Chewsville, MD (formerly at Battery Vicars, Fort Worden, WA)
- One 5-inch gun M1897, Bethlehem No. Unk., Boonsboro, MD

== See also ==
- Coastal artillery
- Seacoast defense in the United States
- United States Army Coast Artillery Corps
- Harbor Defense Command
- 5"/51 caliber gun - Navy weapon of similar size and era, some used as coast defense in World War II
- Coast Artillery fire control system
- List of field guns
