= Galilee, Rhode Island =

Village in Rhode Island, United States

Coordinates: 41°22′38″N 71°30′37″W

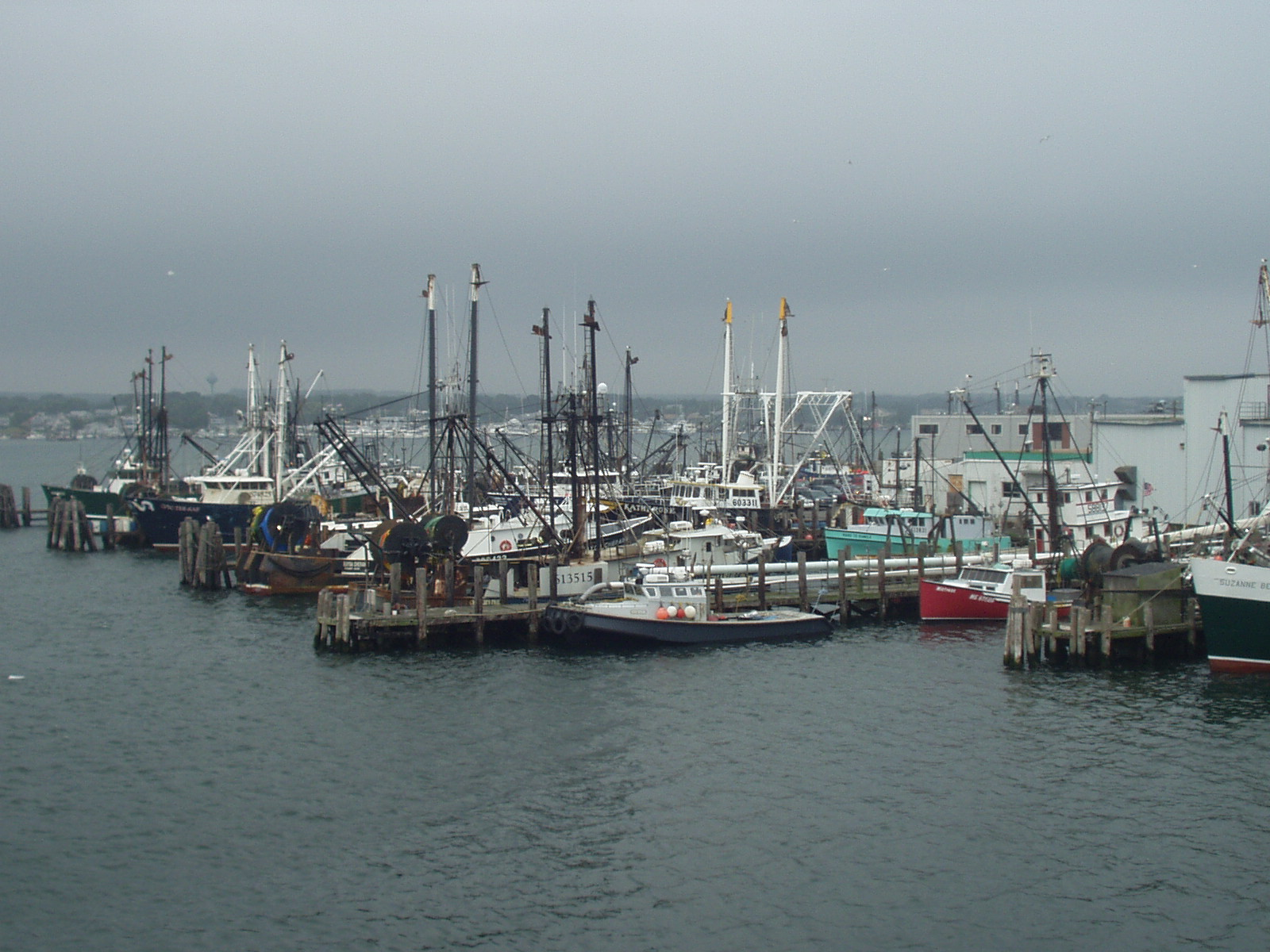
View from Point Judith ferry dock

Galilee is a fishing village on Point Judith within the town of Narragansett, Rhode Island, United States, and is notable for being home to the largest fishing fleet in Rhode Island and for being the site of the Block Island Ferry. The village is directly across the harbor from Jerusalem, Rhode Island. Galilee, Rhode Island is named after the Biblical Galilee, which was the original home region of Jesus Christ, who grew up in Nazareth, a village in the Galilee region of Israel on the Sea of Galilee. Four of Jesus' disciples, Andrew, Peter, James and John, were fishermen from Galilee.

Today, the port of Galilee is responsible for transporting over 16 million pounds of seafood and shellfish each year. Part of the town of Narragansett (population 15,868 in 2010), Galilee experiences significant seasonal population fluctuation and has been known to double in size in the summer months. As summer brings warmer weather, tourists come from all over to visit various state beaches, relax at private beach clubs, take the ferry to Block Island, and charter boats to go fishing or whale watching.

== History ==
The village received its name "[i]n 1902, the story goes, Thomas Mann a fisherman from Nova Scotia who had settled here, felt the village that had sprung up with its fishing shacks should be called Galilee, after the fishing village of biblical times. One day, an old timer sat on the docks repairing his nets when a stranger called out to him, "Where am I". The answer was "Galilee". "And what is that?" the stranger asked pointing to the other side of the channel. The old timer thought for a minute, nodded his head and replied, "must be Jerusalem". And so the name of Galilee and Jerusalem have been used since to denote a most picturesque part of Rhode Island."

In the nineteenth-century the area had developed as a fishing village, and in the early twentieth century, the State dredged the breachway and constructed stone jetties. Later the Army Corps of Engineers constructed three mile long breakwaters to provide a safe harbor of refuge for ships traveling between New York and Boston if they encountered bad weather.

On Saturday, July 11, 2015, a mysterious explosion at Galilee's Salty Brine State Beach injured two people. This explosion was suspected to be caused by a reaction between an abandoned copper cable located under the sand and an unusually large quantity of hydrogen in that location. Local residents described the sound as similar to the explosion of a grenade. One individual was thrown over 10 feet away by the blast, resulting in two fractured ribs among other lesser injuries.

On Tuesday, March 14, 2017, a 100-foot tall wind turbine located in Galilee Rhode Island was toppled over by an intense winter storm. Strong winds snapped the turbines supporting metal structure in half. Along with the snow, strong winds, and toppled wind turbine, many of the households in Galilee suffered from a loss of power due to this storm. The turbine was reported to have toppled around 11:00 am. Shortly after, around noon, the town's loss of power followed.

== Attractions ==
Today Galilee remains home to the largest fishing fleet in Rhode Island with commercial fishermen and lobstermen as well as deep sea fish cruises. Due to the high volume of fishermen, it is often easy to find fresh lobster and fish to purchase off the dock directly from boats, as well as in shops and restaurants. There are over 10 seafood restaurants in the village of Galilee and there is also access to the Salty Brine State Beach. This beach, along with Roger Wheeler State Beach and Scarborough State Beach, span the coast of Galilee and are divided up by private beaches, beach clubs, and fishing docks. Kayaking, fishing, and sight-seeing are some of the most common activities to do at the beaches in Galilee, with not only whales but gray seals, harp seals, and hooded seals frequently spotted around the area. Other popular places in the port of Galilee to visit include the 100-foot tall wind turbine, the Point Judith lighthouse and Fisherman's Memorial State Park.

The Block Island Ferry operates out of Galilee, going back and forth over 13 miles between Block Island and Galilee in under an hour.
