= Scarborough Beach =

Scarborough Beach or Scarboro Beach may refer to any of the following:

- Scarboro Beach Amusement Park, a defunct amusement park in Toronto, Canada
- Scarborough, Maine, United States
- Scarborough, North Yorkshire, United Kingdom
- Scarborough, Queensland, Australia
- Scarborough, Western Australia
  - Scarborough Beach Road, an arterial road
- Scarborough, Western Cape, South Africa
- Scarborough Beach (Rhode Island), United States
