= Brenton Point State Park =

Recreation area in Rhode Island, US

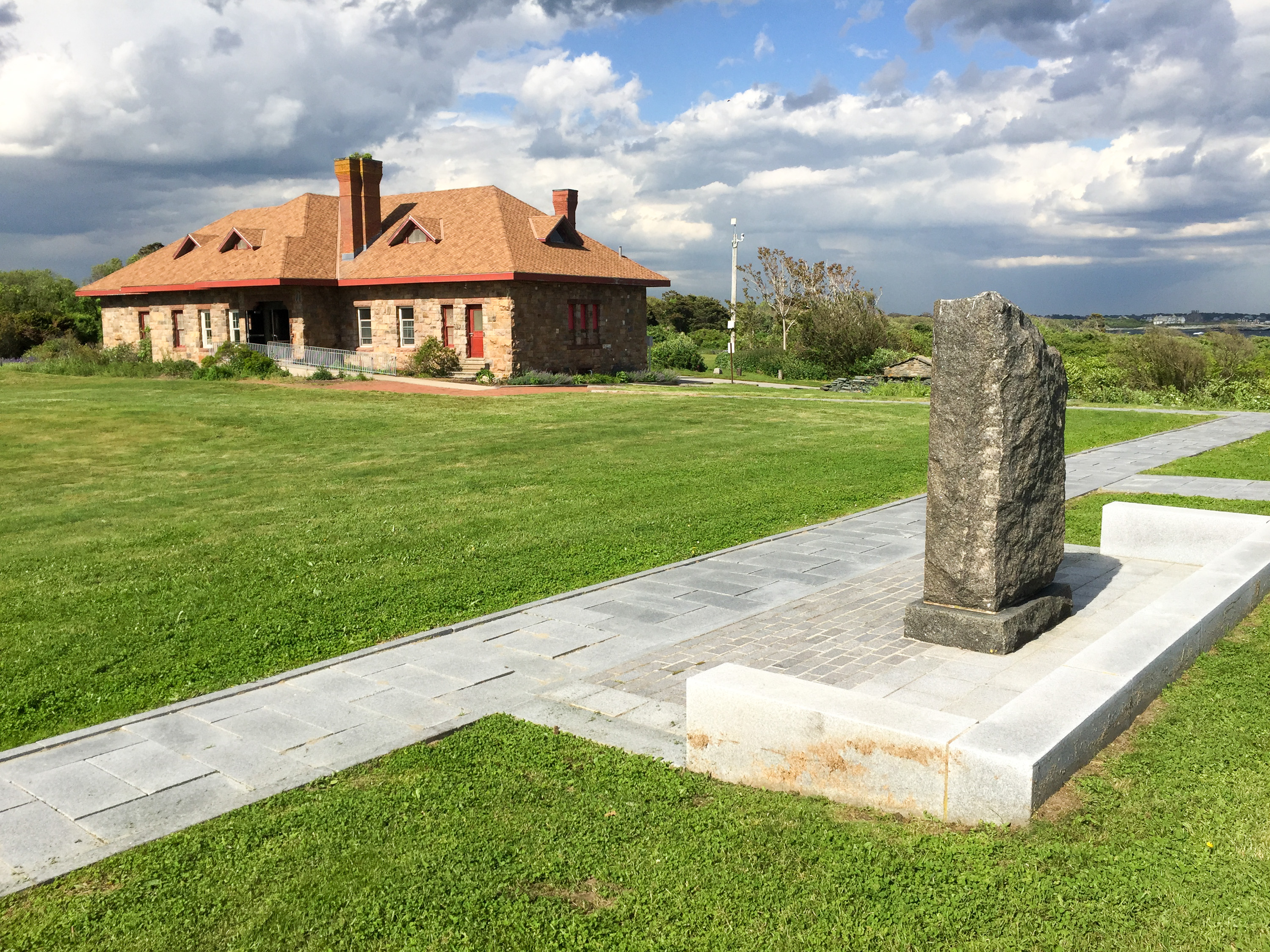

- Location within Rhode Island
- Interactive map of Brenton Point State Park
- Location: Newport, Rhode Island, United States
- Coordinates: 41°26′55″N 71°21′18″W
- Area: 88.9 acres (36.0 ha)
- Elevation: −7 ft (−2.1 m)
- Established: 1976
- Administrator: Rhode Island Department of Environmental Management Division of Parks & Recreation
- Website: Official website
- Rhode Island State Parks

Brenton Point State Park is a public recreation area occupying 89 acres (36 ha) at the southwestern tip of Aquidneck Island in the city of Newport, Rhode Island. The state park offers wide vistas of the Atlantic Ocean where it meets Narragansett Bay. The park lies adjacent to the Newport Country Club, part of Newport's Ocean Drive Historic District. It is managed by the Rhode Island Department of Environmental Management, Division of Parks and Recreation, and is overseen by the staff at nearby Fort Adams State Park.

== History ==
Brenton Point bears the name of Governor William Brenton, an early settler who owned the land as a large farm in the 17th century. Brenton called the area "Hammersmith," a name which survives in the name of Hammersmith Farm, an estate on the point later owned by the family of First Lady Jackie Kennedy Onassis. In 1776, during the American Revolution, a battery was set up on the southwest part of Brenton Point as a coastal defense.

Between 1876 and 1883, lawyer and businessman Theodore M. Davis built a mansion known as "The Reef" or "The Reefs" on the property, where he lived until his death in 1915. In 1906, the wooden stables burned down, and were replaced by a two-story stone and concrete carriage house, stables, and apartment for servants. A stone observation tower was also constructed, which contained fire-fighting water and a clock with musical chimes; the carriage house and tower were named The Bells.

Following the death in 1922 of Emma Andrews, Davis's longtime mistress, the estate became the property of auto magnate Milton J. Budlong. During World War II, the Budlong home was condemned and purchased by the government in order to erect a coastal defense battery as part of the Harbor Defenses of Narragansett Bay. One of the original four circular concrete "Panama mounts," built for towed 155 mm guns, remains in place. Radar and searchlights were also in the area. An anti-motor torpedo boat battery, AMTB 923, was at Brenton Point from July 1943 until moved to Fort Wetherill in July 1944. This battery had four 90 mm guns and two 37 mm guns. At war's end, the battery was dismantled, and the estate returned to the Budlong's, who allowed the property to fall into disrepair.

The heavily vandalized manor house was partially destroyed by fire in 1960 or 1961, then torn down in 1963. The state took possession in 1969 as part of Governor John Chafee's Green Acres program; it was then dedicated as a state park in 1974. The park opened to the public in 1976.

The former laundry/servants' quarters building serves as the park's visitor center and rangers office. The Bells carriage house was demolished in February 2024, after some trespassing teenagers fell through the roof. The stone observation tower remains and is used by park rangers and tourists to view the forest and ocean.

== Activities and amenities ==
The park offers picnicking facilities, hiking paths, fishing, and kite flying, and is home to the annual Newport Kite Festival.

Though the park is open for parking for fishermen after dusk, state park rangers are known to strictly enforce park regulations even after hours, in response to several large parties that have taken place on the property in years past.

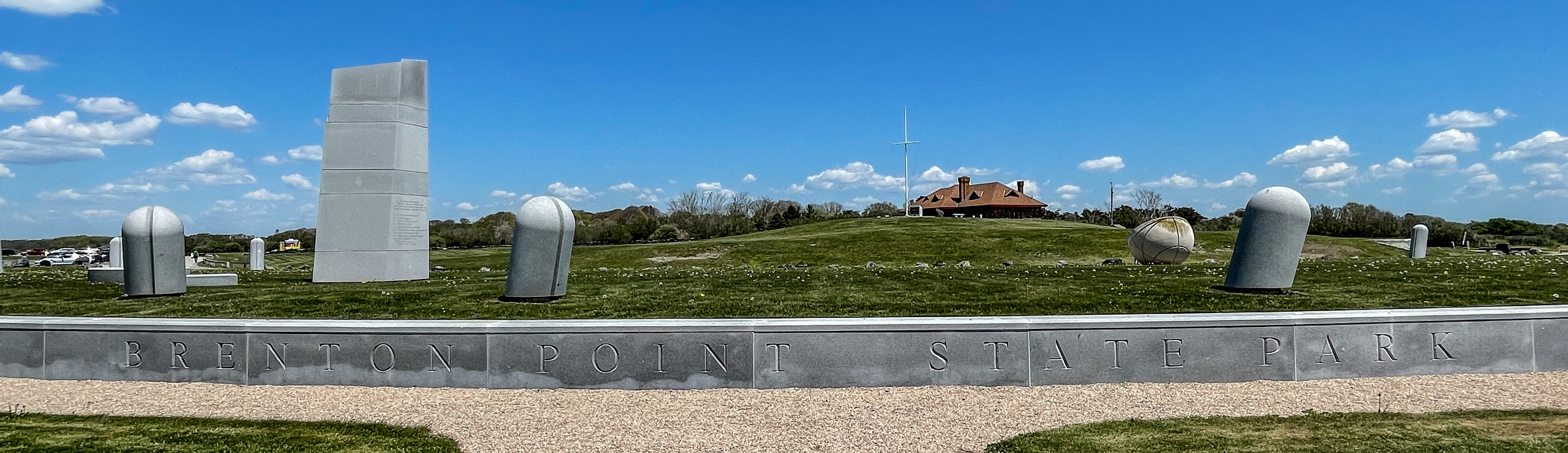
Portuguese Discovery Monument at Brenton Point State Park
