= Fort Wetherill State Park =

State park in Rhode Island, US

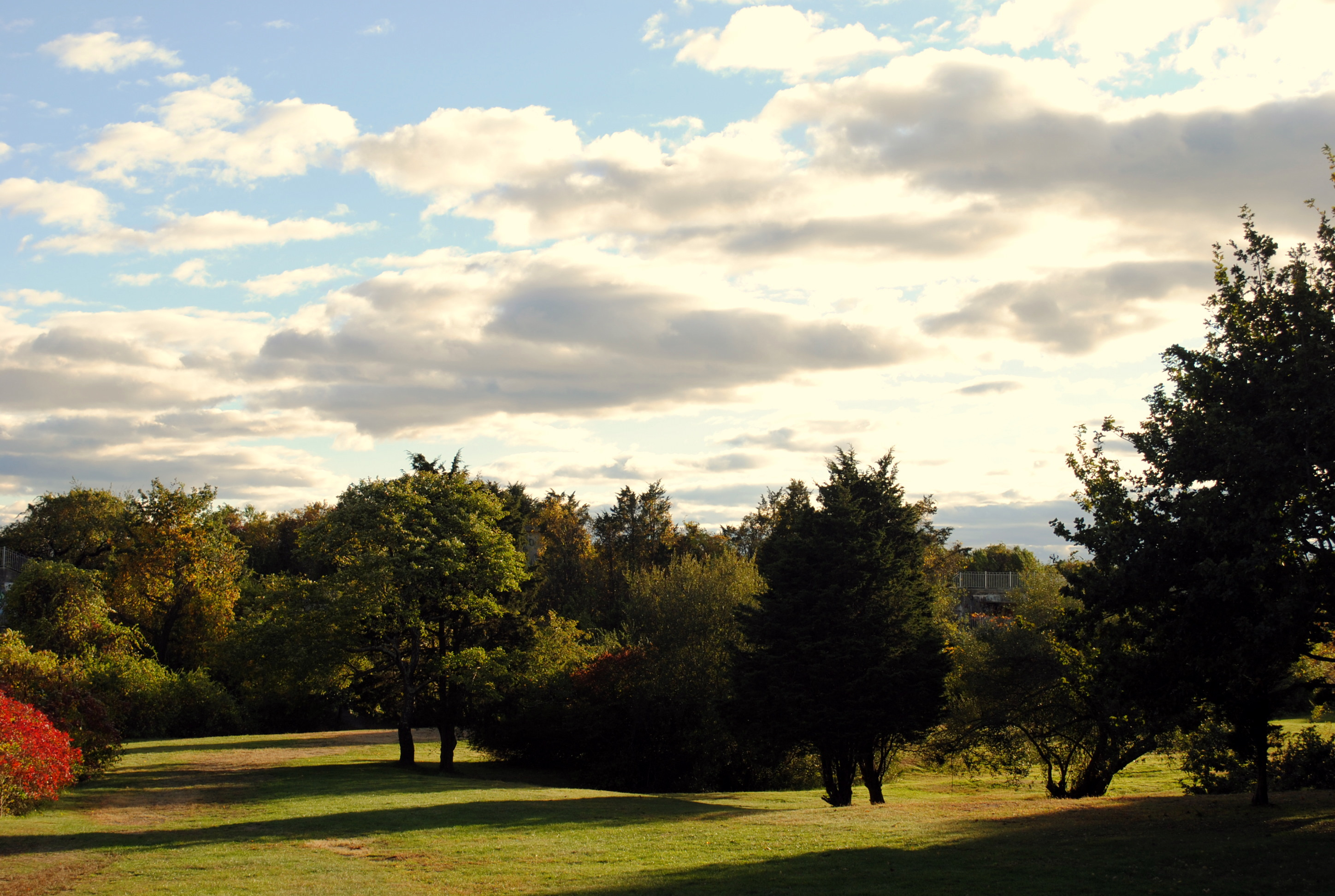

- Location within Rhode Island
- Interactive map of Fort Wetherill State Park
- Location: Jamestown, Rhode Island, United States
- Coordinates: 41°28′38″N 71°21′28″W
- Area: 61.5 acres (24.9 ha)
- Elevation: 0 ft (0 m)
- Established: 1972
- Administrator: Rhode Island Department of Environmental Management, Division of Parks & Recreation
- Website: Official website
- Rhode Island State Parks

Fort Wetherill State Park is a public recreation area occupying 61.5 acres (24.9 ha) at the southeastern tip of Conanicut Island in the town of Jamestown, Rhode Island. The state park sits on the East Passage of Narragansett Bay opposite Fort Adams State Park. From 1901 through World War II, Fort Wetherill and Fort Adams were part of a string of coastal defenses designed to protect the bay's entrance points. The Fort Wetherill battery and training camp were acquired by the State of Rhode Island from the United States in 1972. The park is used for sightseeing, scuba diving, picnicking, boating, fishing, and hiking. As of 2020, the fort itself is almost completely covered in graffiti.

== In popular culture ==
The beach scene in the 2012 film Moonrise Kingdom, directed by Wes Anderson, was shot at Fort Wetherill State Park.
