= List of Rhode Island state parks =

Rhode Island state parks (green), state beaches (red), and other sites (black).

This is a list of state parks and beaches in the state of Rhode Island.

There are twenty-two major facilities that make up the RI State Park system. This includes eight state (saltwater) beaches and five (non-surf) beaches, along with smaller public use lands managed by the Division of Parks and Recreation within the Rhode Island Department of Environmental Management.

== State parks ==
Name	Town	County	Area		Estab- lished	Image	Remarks
Beavertail State Park	Jamestown	Newport	153 acres	62 ha	1980		Operational lighthouse, ocean views
Blackstone River Bikeway State Park	Cumberland, Lincoln, Woonsocket	Providence	11.5 mi	18.5 km	1998		One leg of the East Coast Greenway
Brenton Point State Park	Newport	Newport	88.9 acres	36.0 ha	1974		Host site of the Newport Kite Festival
Burlingame State Park	Charlestown	Washington	3,100 acres	1,300 ha	1930		Camping and recreation on and around Watchaug Pond
Colt State Park	Bristol	Bristol	464 acres	188 ha	1965		The "Jewel" of the state park system
Fishermen's Memorial State Park	Narragansett	Washington	91 acres	37 ha	1970		Oceanside camping
Fort Adams State Park	Newport	Newport	100 acres	40 ha	1965		Site of the Newport Jazz Festival and
Fort Wetherill State Park	Jamestown	Newport	61.5 acres	24.9 ha	1972		Sightseeing, scuba diving
Goddard Memorial State Park	Warwick	Kent	490 acres	200 ha	1927		Golf course, bridle trails, swimming, performing arts center
Haines Memorial State Park	Barrington	Bristol	102 acres	41 ha	1911		Boating access to Narragansett Bay
Lincoln Woods State Park	Lincoln	Providence	627 acres	254 ha	1908		Freshwater beaches on Olney Pond
Pulaski State Park	Glocester	Providence	100 acres	40 ha	1939		Day use facility in Chepachet, within the George Washington Management Area
Rocky Point State Park	Warwick	Kent	120 acres	49 ha	2014		Coastal park on the former site of Rocky Point Amusement Park, which operated from the 1840s-1995.
Snake Den State Park	Johnston	Providence	1,000 acres	400 ha	1969		Undeveloped historic farm property
World War II Memorial State Park	Woonsocket	Providence	14 acres	5.7 ha	1977		City-managed park; site of annual fall festival

== State beaches ==
Name	Town	County	Area		Estab- lished	Image	Remarks
Charlestown Breachway State Beach	Charlestown	Washington	79 acres	32 ha	1952		Camping, beach activities
East Beach State Beach	Charlestown	Washington	400 acres	160 ha	1967		Expanded by 250 acres in 2006; small, seasonal campground
East Matunuck State Beach	South Kingstown	Washington	144 acres	58 ha	1956		Modern beach pavilion opened in 2012
Misquamicut State Beach	Westerly	Washington	51 acres	21 ha	1959		Beach pavilion opened in 1999; site of spring and fall music festivals
Roger Wheeler State Beach	Narragansett	Washington	27 acres	11 ha	1929		Facilities redesigned and renovated in 1997
Salty Brine State Beach	Narragansett	Washington	1.3 acres	0.53 ha	1954		New beach pavilion and boardwalk added in 2010
Scarborough State Beaches	Narragansett	Washington	30 acres	12 ha	1937		Two units; swimming, observation tower, boardwalk

== Other Division of Parks and Recreation lands ==
The State of Rhode Island Division of Parks and Recreation manages other state lands which do not have a state park or state beach designation.

Name	County	Town	Area	Established	Image	Remarks
Arcadia Management Area	Kent, Washington	Exeter, Hopkinton, Richmond, West Greenwich	14,000 acres (5,700 ha)			State's largest recreational area
Beach Pond	Washington	Exeter				Managed by the Division of Forest Environment; extends into Voluntown, Connecticut
East Bay Bike Path State Park	Bristol, Providence	Barrington, East Providence, Warren	14.5 miles (23.3 km)	1987		Another leg of the East Coast Greenway
George Washington State Campground	Providence	Glocester	100 acres (40 ha)			Overnight camping facility in Chepachet, within the George Washington Management Area
John H. Chafee Nature Preserve	Washington	North Kingstown				
