= Salty Brine State Beach =

State beach in Washington County, Rhode Island

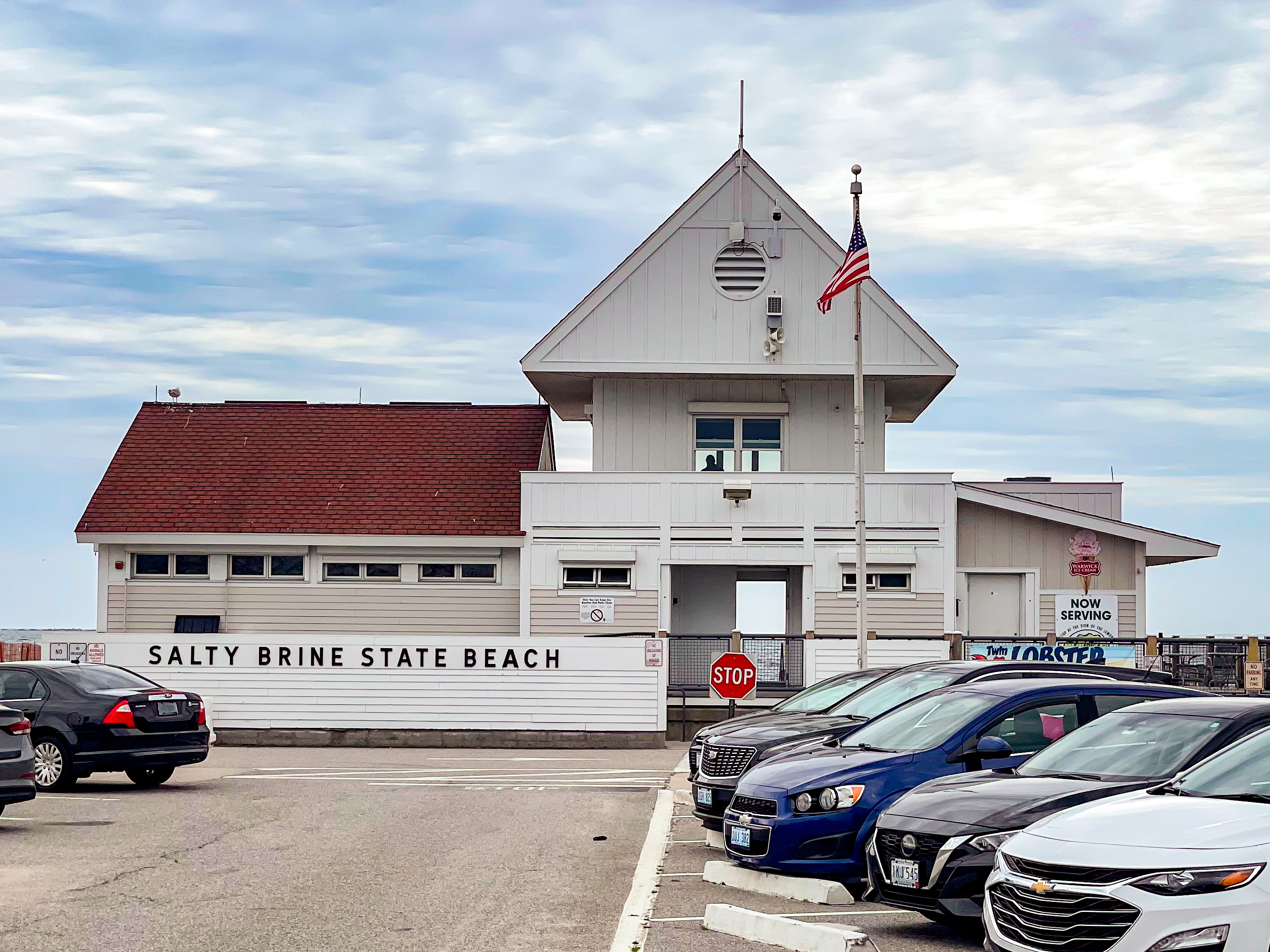

- Location within Rhode Island
- Interactive map of Salty Brine State Beach
- Location: Galilee, Rhode Island, United States
- Coordinates: 41°22′33″N 71°30′42″W
- Area: 1.33 acres (0.54 ha)
- Elevation: 0 ft (0 m)
- Established: 1954
- Named for: A broadcasting personality
- Administrator: Rhode Island Department of Environmental Management, Division of Parks & Recreation
- Website: Official website
- Rhode Island State Parks

Salty Brine State Beach is a public recreation area occupying slightly more than one acre (0.40 ha) of ocean shore in the village of Galilee, town of Narragansett, Rhode Island. The area offers ocean swimming and saltwater fishing and is open seasonally.

== History ==
Established in 1954 as Galilee State Beach, it was renamed in 1990 to honor Salty Brine, a Rhode Island radio and television personality. A 2,800-square-foot (260 m^{2}) beach pavilion and boardwalk were added to the facility in 2010.

== In the news ==
On July 11, 2015, the beach came to national attention when a woman suffered broken ribs and other injuries from an explosion under the sand that hurled her four feet into the air, landing her ten feet from her beach chair. The cause of the explosion was attributed to hydrogen formed by the underwater corrosion of copper in an abandoned electric cable.
