= East Matunuck State Beach =

State beach in Washington County, Rhode Island

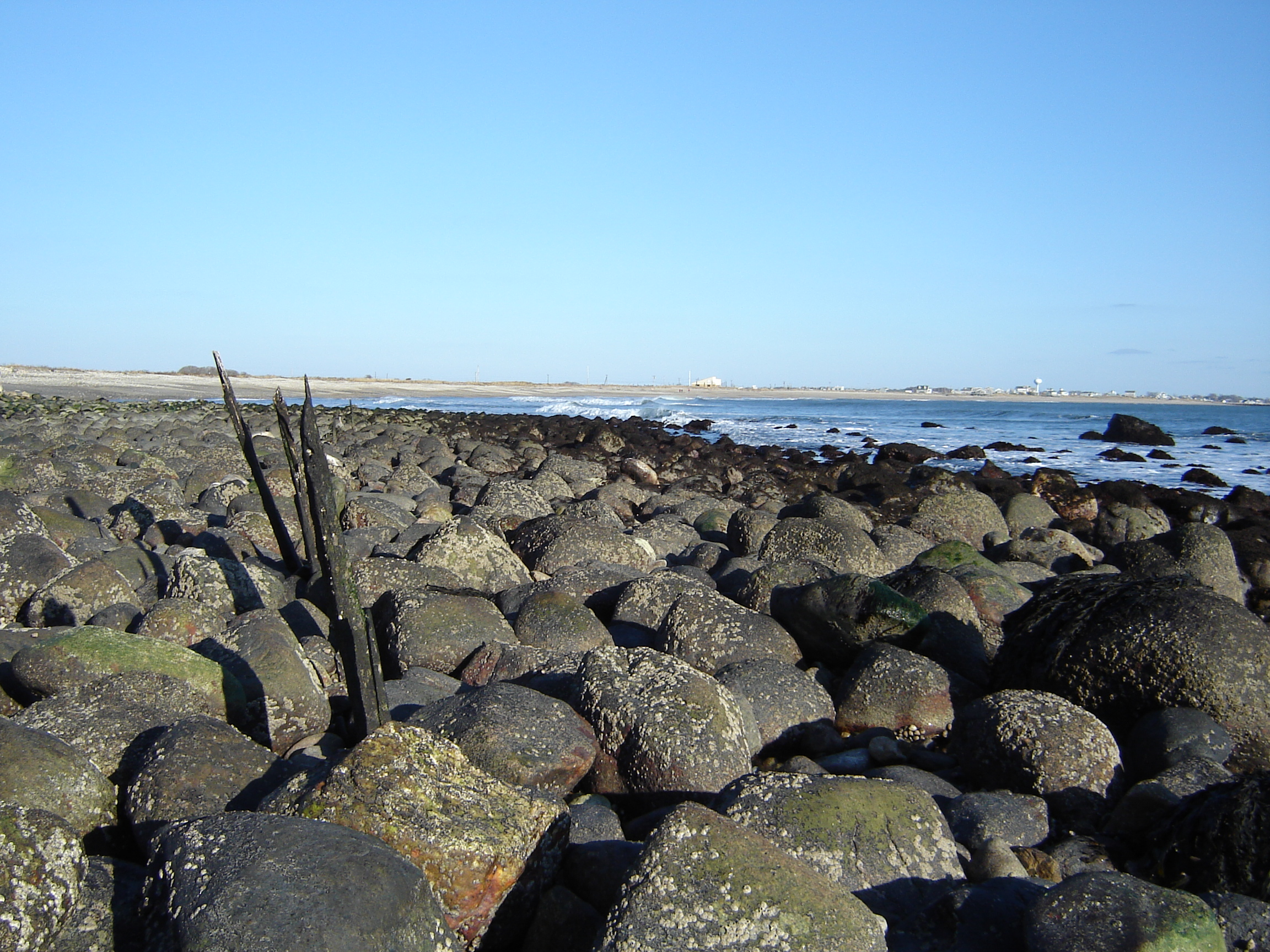
- View of East Matunuck beach from the rocky stretch along the beach's western shore.

- Location within Rhode Island
- Interactive map of East Matunuck State Beach
- Location: South Kingstown, Rhode Island, United States
- Coordinates: 41°22′35″N 71°31′43″W
- Area: 144 acres (58 ha)
- Elevation: 3 ft (0.91 m)
- Established: 1956
- Administrator: Rhode Island Department of Environmental Management, Division of Parks & Recreation
- Website: Official website
- Rhode Island State Parks

East Matunuck State Beach is a public recreation area encompassing 144 acres (58 ha) on the shore of Block Island Sound in the town of South Kingstown, Rhode Island. The state beach offers picnicking, ocean swimming, and beach activities. It is open seasonally.

At the east end of the beach lies the small village of Jerusalem. Jutting out from the beach is the stone breakwater that protects Point Judith Pond and harbor. It was built in 1914.

== History ==
The state began securing the area through condemnation proceedings beginning in 1956. An additional 36-acre (15 ha) parcel was purchased in 1967. A beach pavilion featuring concessions, bathrooms, changing stalls, and a lifeguard tower was built at a cost of $4.5 million and opened in May 2012.

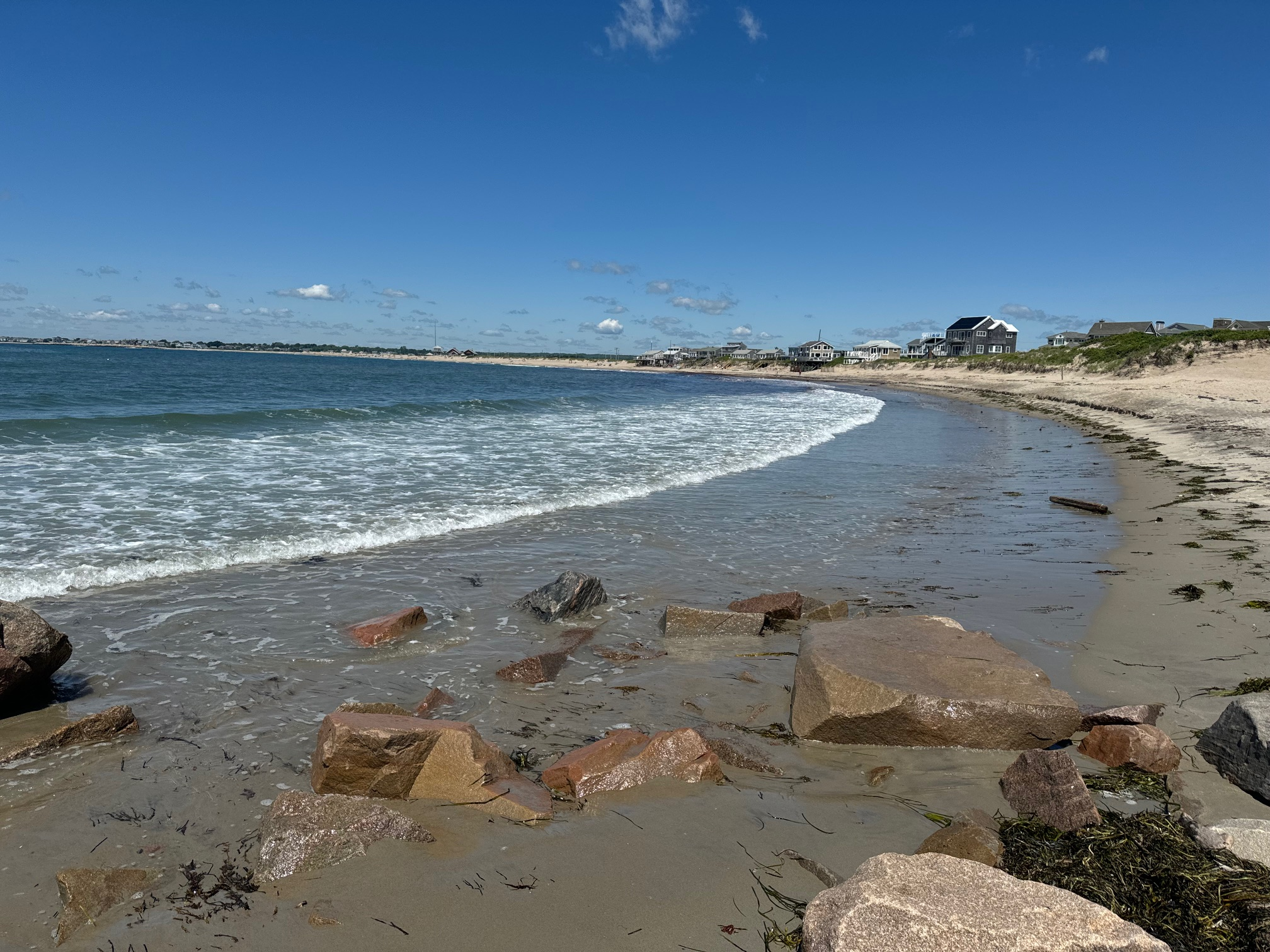
View of East Matunuck State Beach looking west from the east end by the breakwater. It shows the houses along the first part of the beach and the public pavilion in the distance.

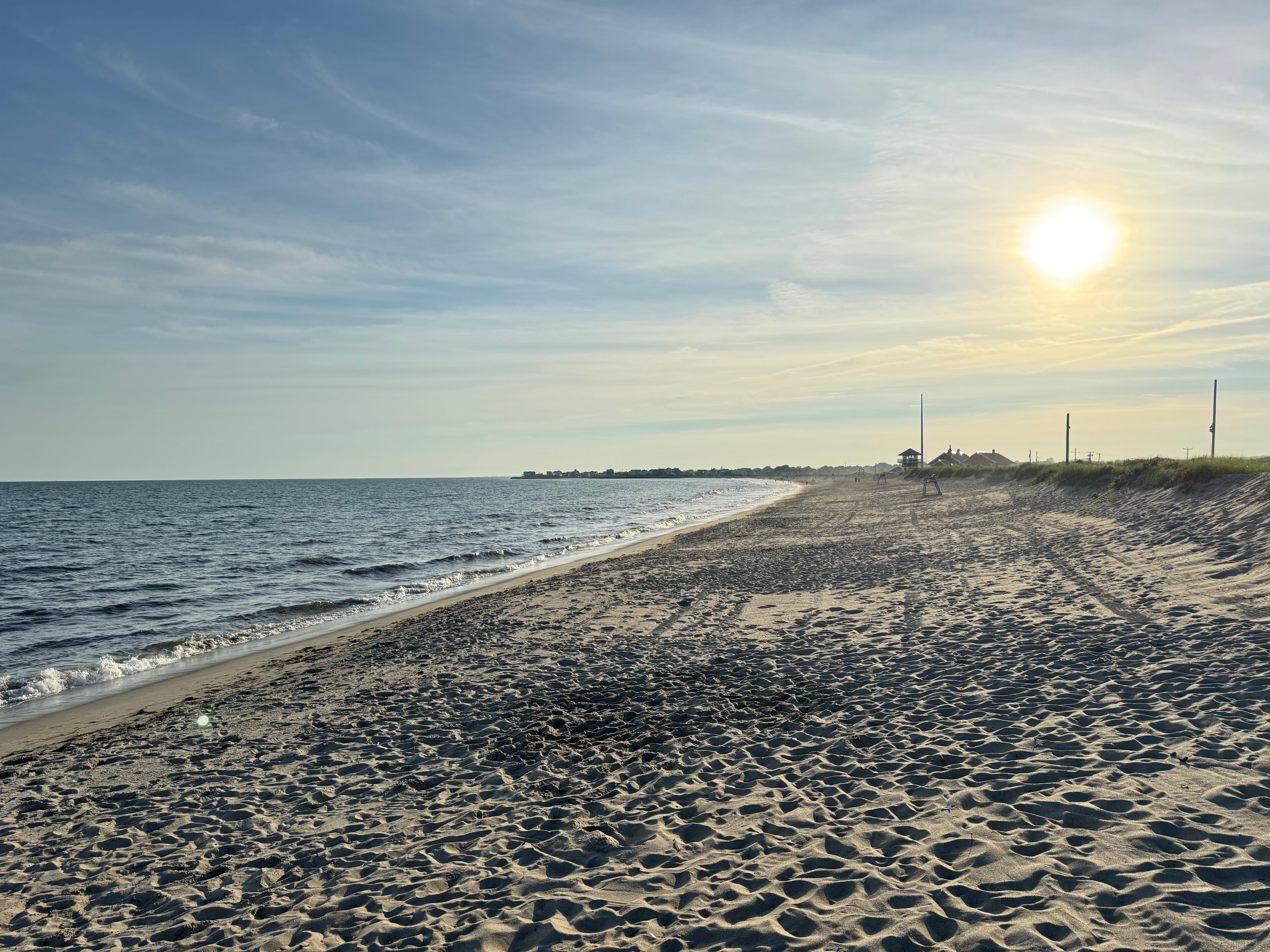
View of East Matunuck State Beach looking west from the start of the fully public portion of the beach. It shows the row of lifeguard chairs and the pavilion.

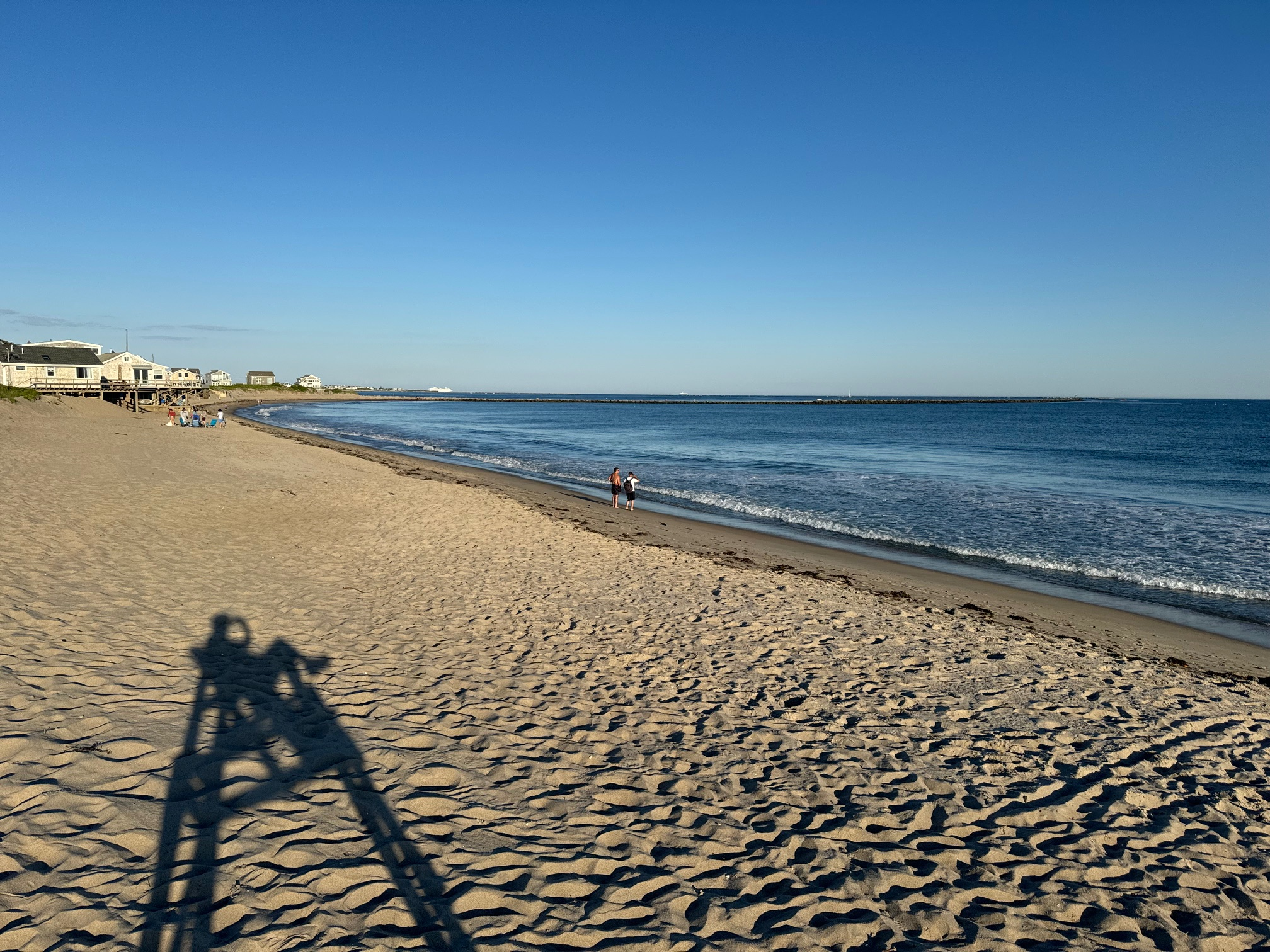
View of East Matunuck State Beach looking east from the first lifeguard chair. It shows the houses on the east end of the beach and the breakwater.

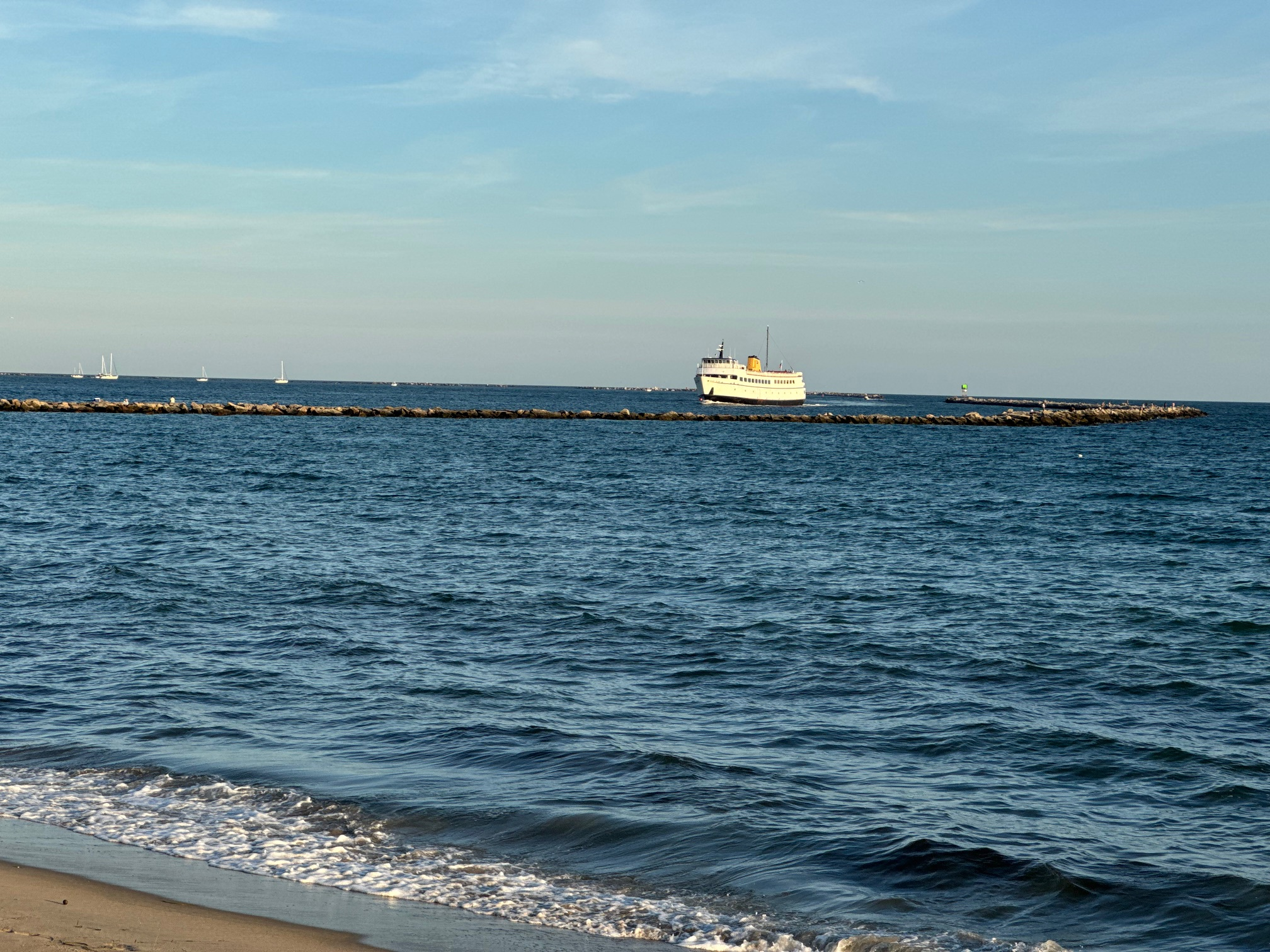
View of the breakwater from the east end of the beach. The boat is the Block Island Ferry.
