= Pulaski State Park =

State park in Providence County, Rhode Island

Pulaski State Park and Recreational Area
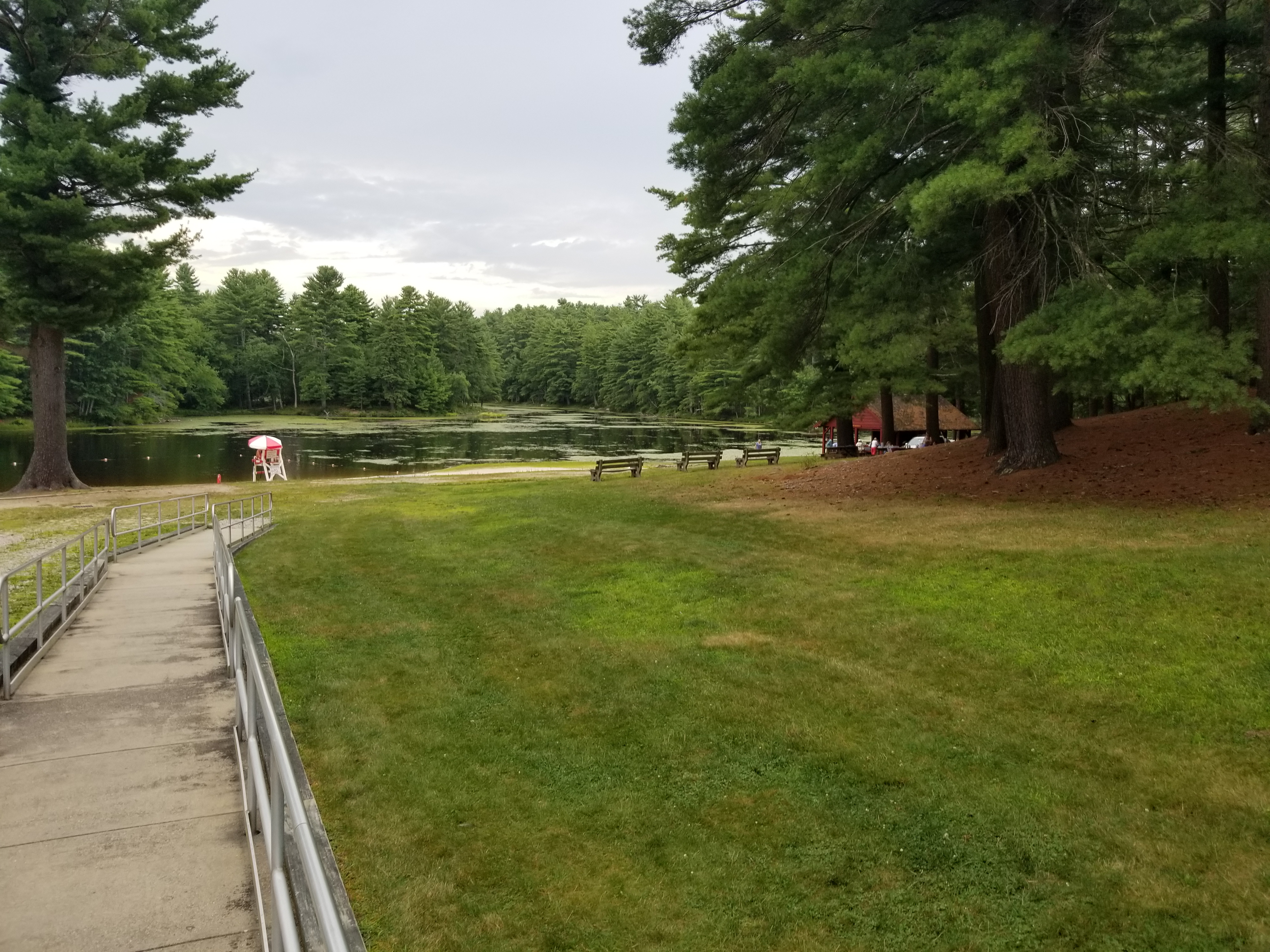

- Location within Rhode Island Location within the United States
- Interactive map of Pulaski State Park and Recreational Area
- Location: Glocester, Rhode Island, United States
- Coordinates: 41°55′37″N 71°47′44″W
- Area: 100 acres (40 ha)
- Established: 1946
- Administrator: Rhode Island Department of Environmental Management, Division of Parks & Recreation
- Website: Official website
- Rhode Island State Parks

Pulaski State Park is a 100-acre state park near the village of Chepachet in Glocester, Rhode Island. It was founded in 1939 and contains a day use facility inside the George Washington Management Area with a beach and covered picnic areas. The Civilian Conservation Corps built a road to the park when "[i]n 1940, the state acquired a lease from the federal government for what is now the Casimir Pulaski State Park and Peck Pond in what is now the Glocester-Burrillville line.
