= Fort Adams State Park =

State park in Rhode Island, US

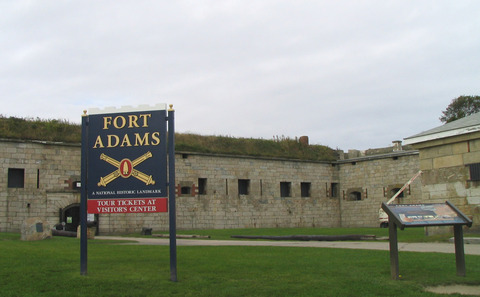

- Location within Rhode Island
- Interactive map of Fort Adams State Park
- Location: Newport, Rhode Island, United States
- Coordinates: 41°28′41″N 71°20′08″W
- Area: 105 acres (42 ha)
- Elevation: 7 ft (2.1 m)
- Established: 1965
- Administrator: Rhode Island Department of Environmental Management, Division of Parks & Recreation; United States Department of Defense
- Website: Official website
- Rhode Island State Parks

Fort Adams State Park is a public recreation and historic area preserving Fort Adams, a large coastal fortification located at the harbor mouth in Newport, Rhode Island, that was active from 1841 through the first half of the 20th century. The state park hosts the annual Newport Jazz Festival and Newport Folk Festival and is the home of Sail Newport and Eisenhower House.

== History ==
The area was originally owned by William Brenton, who called the region "Hammersmith," a name that survives in the name of the adjacent Hammersmith Farm. Following its long tenure as a military installation, the State of Rhode Island took possession of Fort Adams for use as a state park in 1965.

== Activities and amenities ==
In addition to panoramic views of the harbor and Narragansett Bay, the park offers swimming, boating, picnicking, and athletic fields. The Joseph "Jay" Kirwin Memorial Rugby Pitch is home to Newport Rugby Football Club and to the rugby teams of Salve Regina University. In addition to the dedicated Kirwin rugby pitch, there are two soccer fields/rugby pitches. The annual Newport Rugby Sevens Tournament is held at the fort each summer.

The Fort Adams Trust offers seasonal guided tours of Fort Adams, the Fort Adams Advanced Southern Redoubt, and the Eisenhower “Summer White House."

Fort Adams State Beach is a small, shallow, roped-off area for swimming, with slightly rocky sand. The adjacent Dr. Fred Alofsin Special Events Building has bathrooms, showers, picnic tables, and a small parking lot.
