= World War II Veterans Memorial State Park =

State park in Providence County, Rhode Island

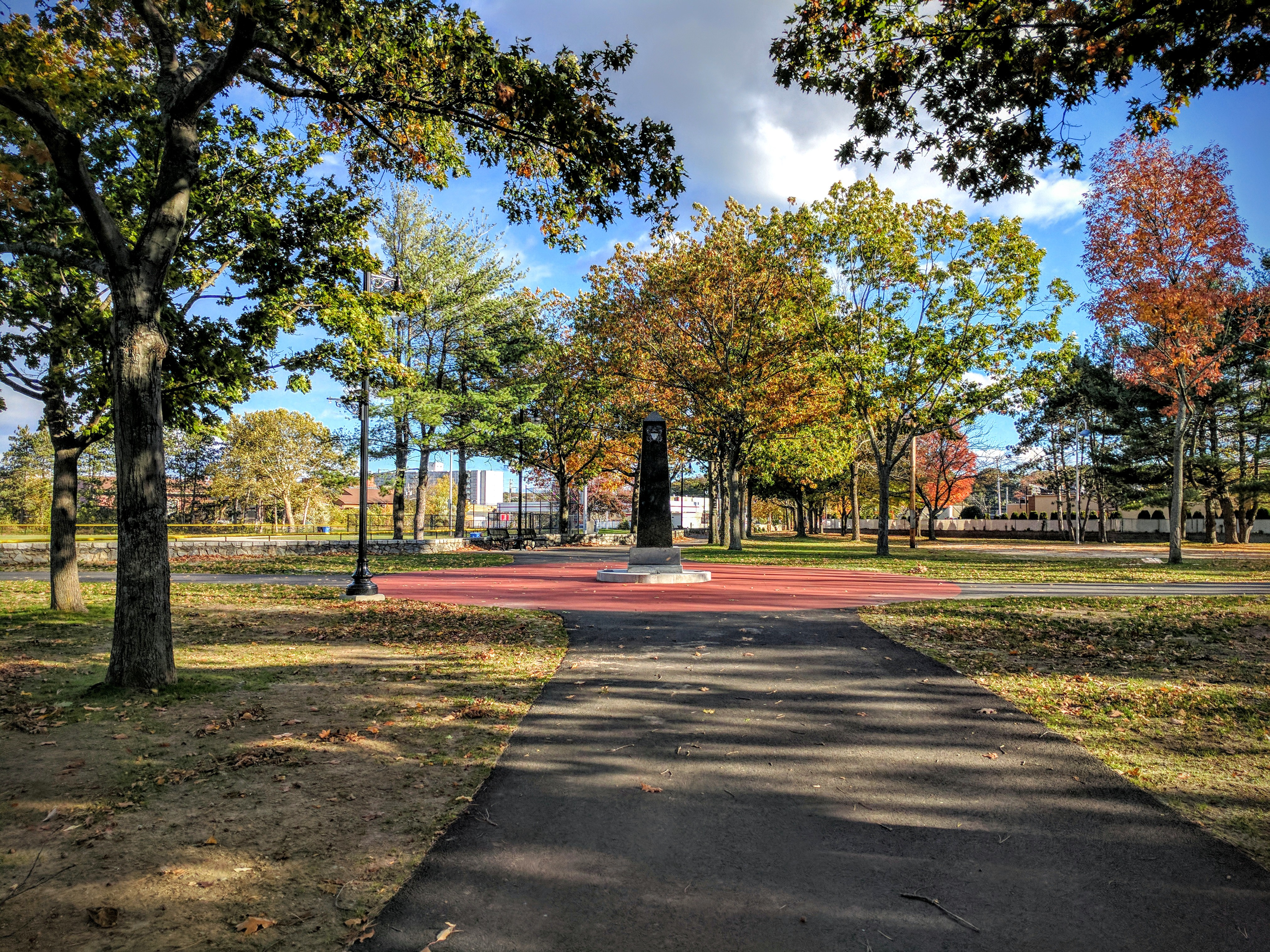

- Location within Rhode Island
- Interactive map of World War II Veterans Memorial; State Park
- Location: Woonsocket, Rhode Island, United States
- Coordinates: 42°00′31″N 71°30′37″W
- Area: 14 acres (5.7 ha)
- Elevation: 138 ft (42 m)
- Established: 1960
- Administrator: City of Woonsocket
- Website: Official website
- Rhode Island State Parks

World War II Veterans Memorial State Park is a public recreation area located in the city of Woonsocket, Rhode Island. The park occupies land known as the Social flatlands where textile mills operated along the banks of the Mill River until the early years of the 20th century. Since 1979, the park has hosted the three-day Autumnfest celebration held annually on Columbus Day Weekend.

== Redevelopment ==
In 2012, the city and state governments were embroiled in a controversy over who should take responsibility for future maintenance of the park. The director of the Department of Environmental Management announced that a $2.6 million plan to refurbish the park, which had fallen into a state of disrepair, would be put on hold until a long-term agreement regarding park maintenance and staffing could be reached with the city. In 2014, the state legislature budgeted moneys for the park's redevelopment and maintenance over a five-year period beginning in 2015 with the aim of allowing "the state ... to turn the land over to the city so it can take charge of its maintenance."

The agreement ultimately reached saw the Department of Environmental Management providing an improvement grant of $2.6 million with the city making an in-kind contribution of preparation work done by the Public Works Department. Improvements under the project saw redesigned grounds with splash park, playground and outdoor activities area, basketball courts, and the new little league baseball field near Social Street. A reopening ceremony for the city-owned and -operated park was scheduled for early 2016.

== Activities and amenities ==
The park offers a splash park, baseball field, basketball courts, playground, picnic tables, walking paths, performance stage, and veterans monument.
