= Jerusalem, Rhode Island =

Village in Narragansett, Rhode Island, US

Coordinates: 41°22′35.9″N 71°30′55.5″W

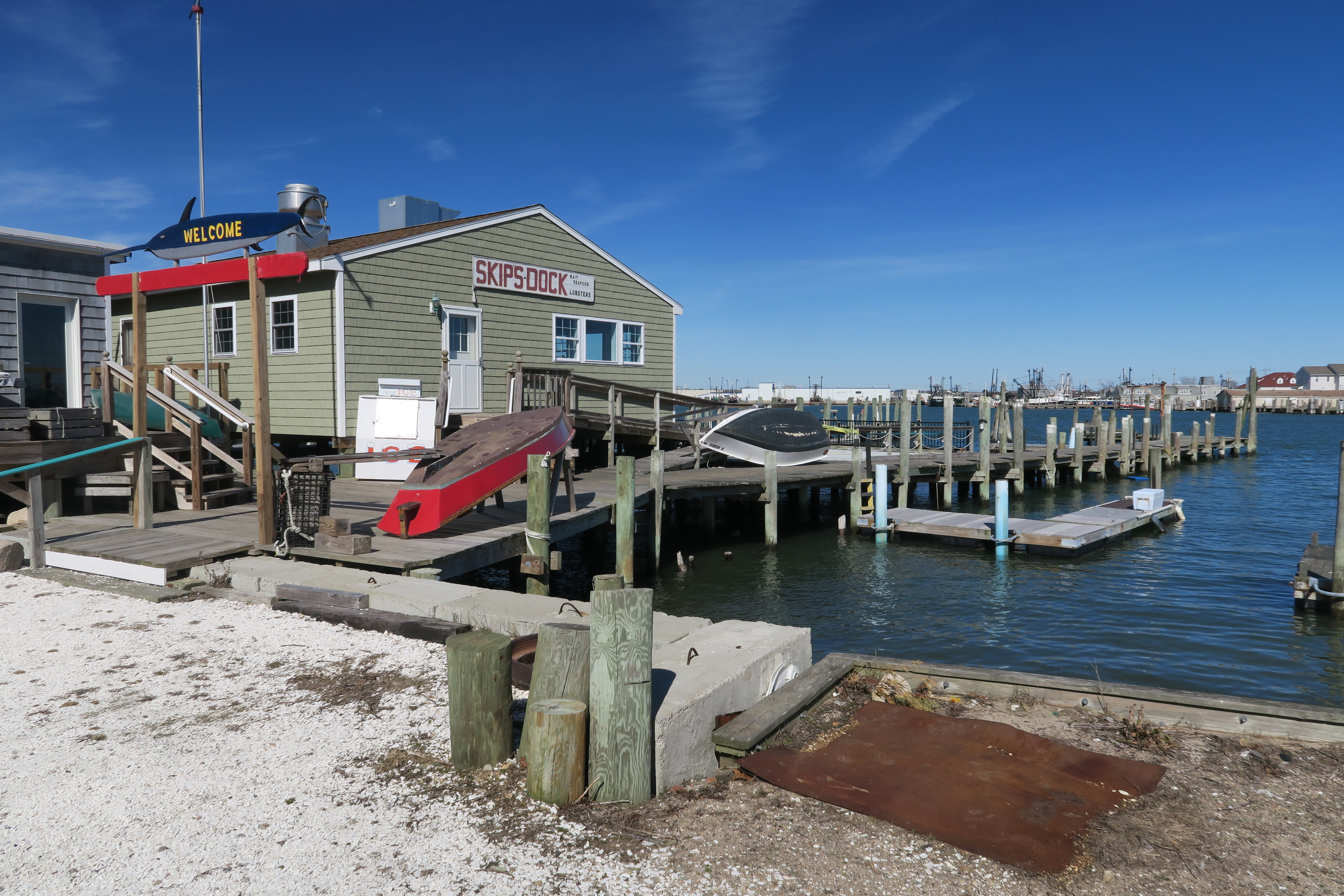
Skips Dock

Jerusalem is a fishing village within the town of Narragansett, Rhode Island, United States, on Point Judith. It is across the harbor from Galilee. It is named after the Biblical city of Jerusalem. Jerusalem is not attached to any other part of Narragansett by land; its only land border is with the Matunuck section of South Kingstown. Although Jerusalem is not in the Town of South Kingstown, fire and police service in Jerusalem is provided by South Kingstown.

Jerusalem lies at the east end of East Matunuck State Beach.

== History ==
The town received its name "in 1902, the story goes, Thomas Mann a fisherman from Nova Scotia who had settled here, felt the village that had sprung up with its fishing shacks should be called Galilee, after the fishing village of biblical times. One day, an old timer sat on the docks repairing his nets when a stranger called out to him, "Where am I?" The answer was "Galilee". "And what is that?" the stranger asked pointing to the other side of the channel. The old timer thought for a minute, nodded his head and replied, "must be Jerusalem". And so the name of Galilee and Jerusalem have been used since to denote a most picturesque part of Rhode Island."
