= Hammersmith Farm =

Victorian mansion in Newport, Rhode Island

Coordinates: 41.469109°N 71.346062°W

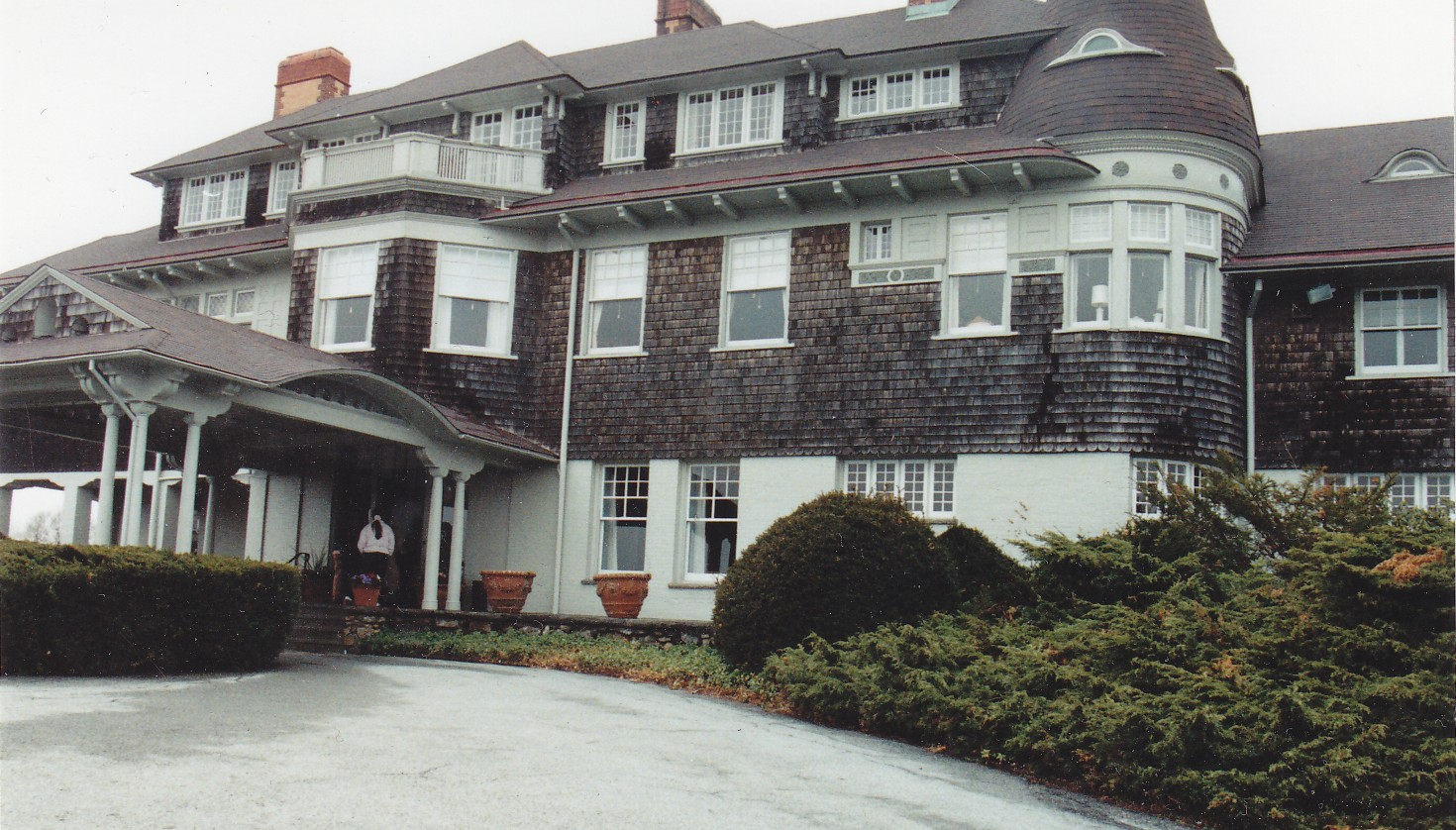
Entrance to Main house of Hammersmith Farm in October, 1989

Hammersmith Farm is a shingle-style mansion and estate located at 225 Harrison Avenue in Newport, Rhode Island, United States. It was a childhood home of First Lady Jacqueline Bouvier Kennedy, and the site of the reception for her wedding to U.S. Senator John F. Kennedy in September, 1953.

== History ==
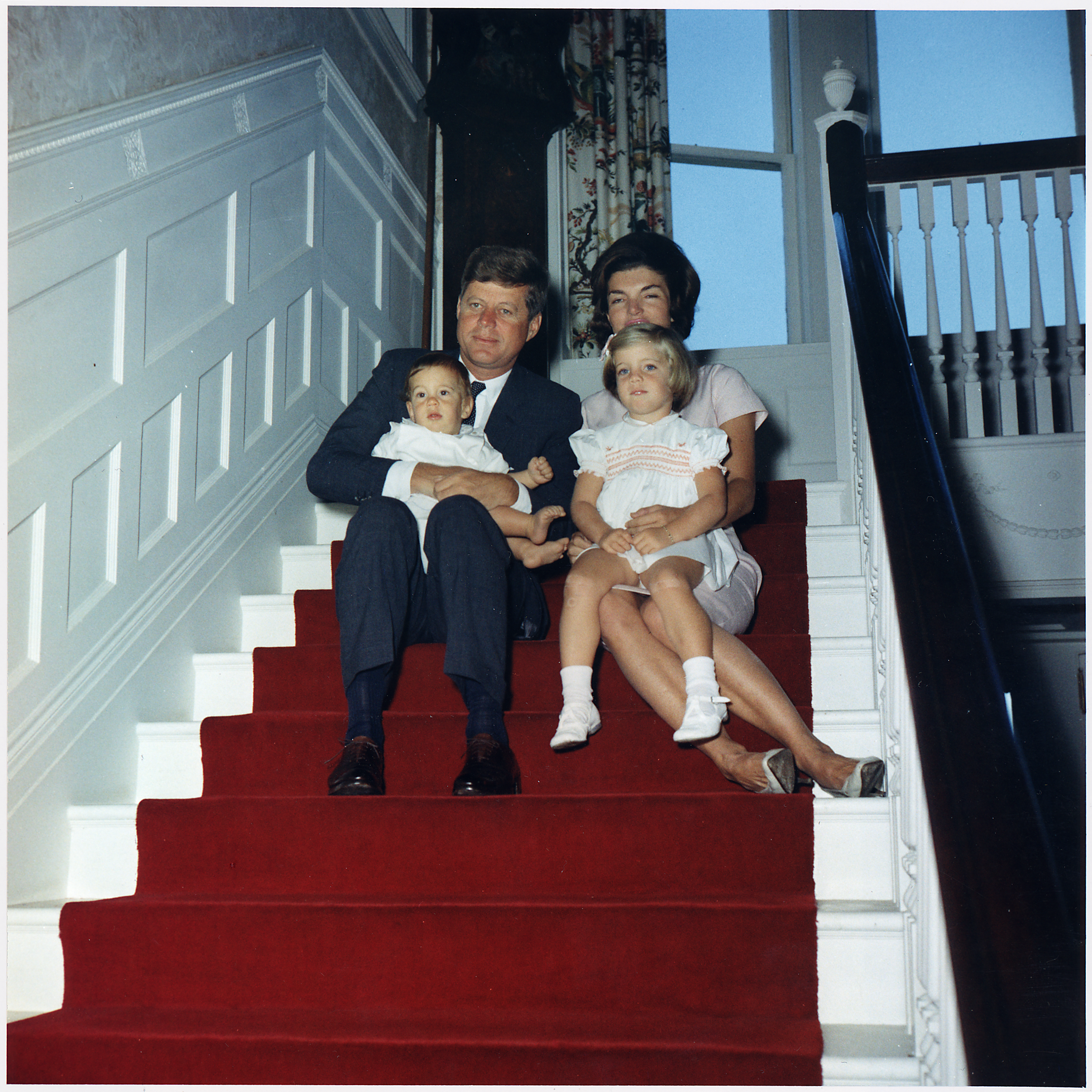
President John F. Kennedy, First Lady Jacqueline Kennedy and their children sitting on the stairs at Hammersmith, September 29, 1961.

Hammersmith Farm's 28-room main house was built in 1887 for John W. Auchincloss, the uncle of Hugh D. Auchincloss (1897–1976), Jacqueline Kennedy's stepfather. It was erected on what had been originally known as "Hammersmith Island," possibly named after the English hometown of William Brenton, the 17th-century governor of Rhode Island who established the first farm on the site in 1640.

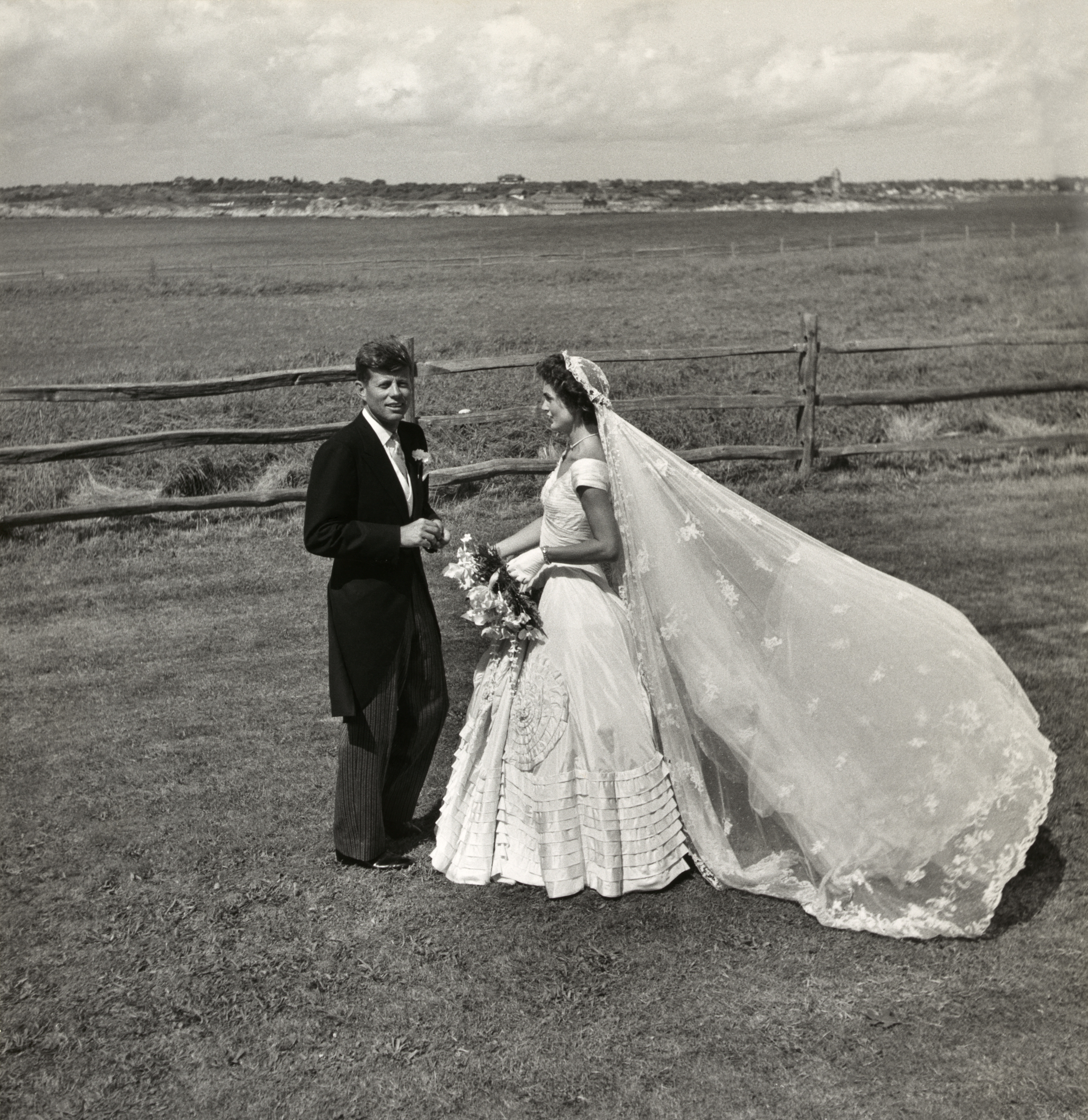
Senator John F. Kennedy and Jacqueline Bouvier Kennedy at Hammersmith on their wedding day, September 12, 1953.

=== During Kennedy Administration ===
During a stay at Hammersmith in late September 1961, President Kennedy announced that John McCone would become the new Director of the Central Intelligence Agency. Additionally, Kennedy signed Public Law 87-293, the Peace Corps Act of 1961.

=== Post-presidency ===
The main house remained in the Auchincloss family until the 1976 death of Hugh Auchincloss. Janet Lee Auchincloss (1907–1989), Jacqueline Kennedy's mother, sold the main house and moved into one of the guesthouses on the farm, called "The Castle". There was another guest house on the farm built to resemble a windmill. A group of investors bought the main house in 1977, and opened it for public tours and special events. Fruit of the Loom executive William F. Farley bought it in 1997 for $6.675 million.

=== Restoration ===
In 1999, Farley sold the main house for over $8 million. The new owner restored the failing building and converted the house back to private use. It had not been lived in since 1974 (over 25 years), and had fallen into serious disrepair.

Much of the original plumbing was inoperable, and old electrical wiring had frayed due to age and rodent damage. Bricks were coming loose and wood rot was everywhere. Metal fixtures were rusted or corroded due to the salt air. Each year the building was listing a little more northward, toward Fort Adams. A major restoration was required to save the damaged structure. Major structural flaws necessitated the removal of one end of the building and the installation of steel and wooden beams for support. The house had suffered from decades of wood rot and mold from condensation and leaking windows. Outside, the brick was bowing due to many successive winters of freezing and expansion. Popping and falling bricks during the winter was routine. The interiors were painstakingly disassembled and numbered and new plumbing, HVAC, and wiring were installed. Later, the numbered moldings and fixtures were replaced or replicated if needed, in their original positions so the historic rooms looked exactly as they had when the building was constructed in 1887, save for the electricity and modern plumbing.

The exterior was restored with equal sensitivity to the original structure. Working with Gubelman and the Historic District Commission, the team removed metal and plexiglass porches, reset brick to match the original, and removed the light green paint used to hide the mismatched brick from decades of repairs. Windows were rebuilt to protect the house from the fierce winter winds from the Atlantic Ocean. New shingles and roof were installed following the original architectural plans, and using the many sketches and photographs taken of the building over its 120-year history. Fortunately, the building had been photographed from numerous angles and vantage points over the many decades, and a clear visual history existed as a guide with the goal to restore the farm as closely as possible to the appearance one might have enjoyed in 1888.

Around half of the original furnishings were returned to the Auchincloss family under a prior agreement, and the family sold them off in a Christie's auction in 2000, which fetched $233,620.

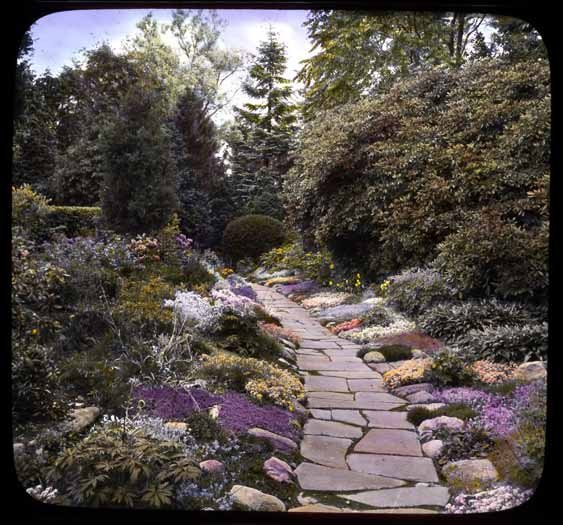
Hammersmith Farm garden, 1930.

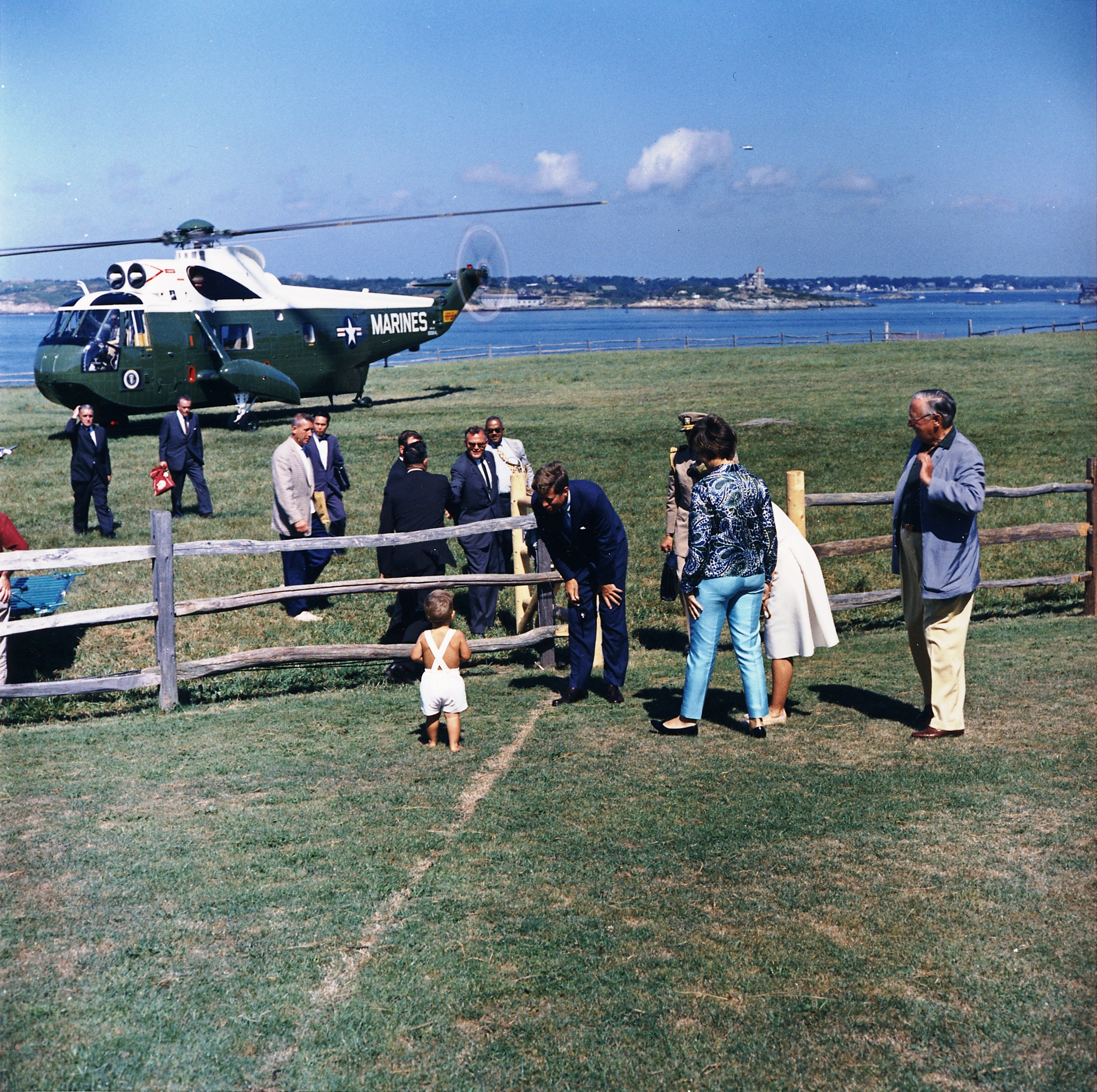
President John F. Kennedy arriving at Hammersmith Farm in 1962.

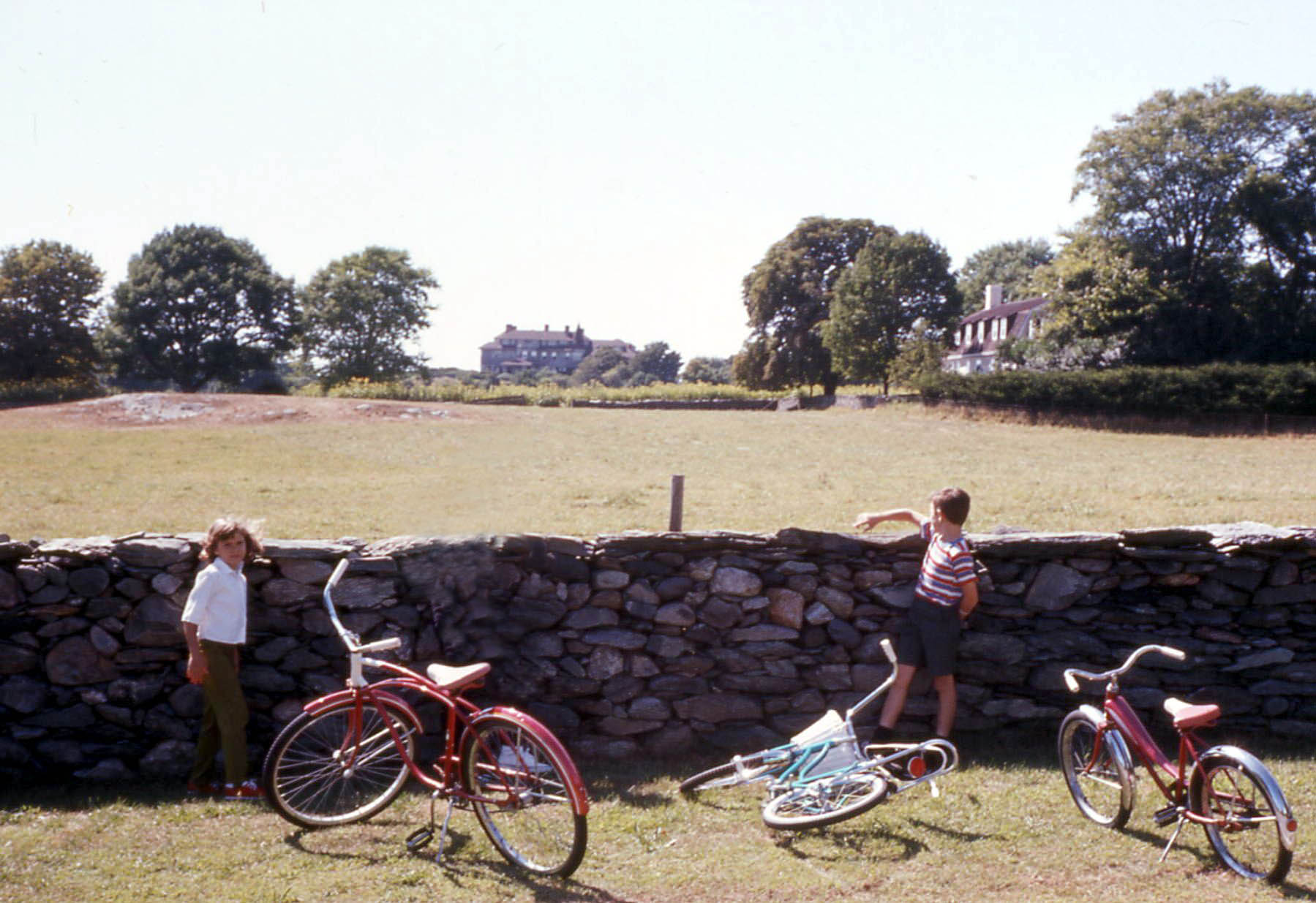
Hammersmith Farm, 1968.

== See also ==
- Brenton Point
- Fort Adams
