= Fishermen's Memorial State Park =

State park in Washington County, Rhode Island

Fishermen's Memorial State Park and Campground
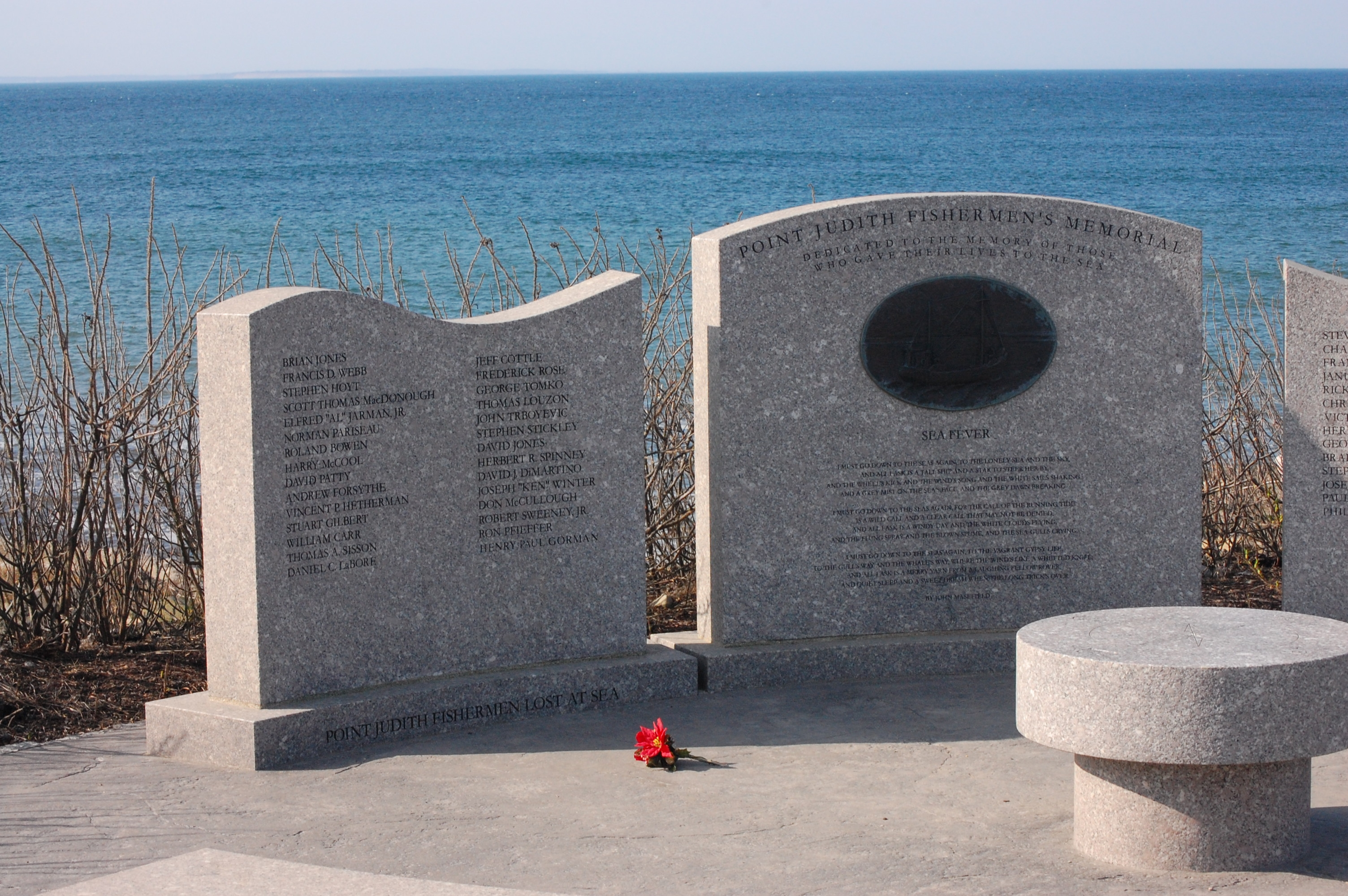
- Point Judith Fisherman's Memorial

- Location within Rhode Island
- Interactive map of Fishermen's Memorial State Park and Campground
- Location: Narragansett, Rhode Island, United States
- Coordinates: 41°22′52″N 71°29′22″W
- Area: 91.46 acres (37.01 ha)
- Elevation: 49 ft (15 m)
- Established: 1953
- Administrator: Rhode Island Department of Environmental Management, Division of Parks & Recreation
- Website: Official website
- Rhode Island State Parks

Fishermen's Memorial State Park is a public recreation area and campground encompassing 91 acres (37 ha) on Point Judith in the town of Narragansett, Rhode Island. The state park occupies a portion of the former Fort Nathaniel Greene, named after Rhode Island native and Revolutionary War general Nathaniel Greene.

== History ==
During World War II, Fort Greene, a 270-acre (110 ha) defensive facility, was constructed as part of a series of coastal defenses around Narragansett Bay. The Battery Hamilton area was heavily fortified with 16-inch guns capable of reaching 26 miles out to sea. After the fort was decommissioned following World War II, the state of Rhode Island began purchasing the land for use as a state park in 1953. The name Fishermen's Memorial was chosen to honor all Narragansett-area fishermen, both commercial and sport. In 1970, the former fort opened as a campground. A former military fire control tower serves as park headquarters. An Army Reserve facility still occupies part of the site.

== Park areas ==
The park is divided into two parcels, formerly the west and south reservations of Fort Greene. The former west reservation is the campground, and includes Battery 109, a massive concrete and earth emplacement intended for two 16-inch guns that was never armed. The former south reservation is near Point Judith Light on the ocean, and includes Battery 211, a bunker that supported two 6-inch guns. The Point Judith Fishermen's Memorial is located next to this bunker. One of the 6-inch gun positions is on the (much eroded) beach in front of Battery 211. Paths are maintained to the tops of the bunkers for Battery 109 and Battery 211, which have excellent views. However, no interpretation of the military facilities in the park is provided.

== Activities and amenities ==
The park offers 147 trailer sites and 35 tent sites.

== Gallery ==
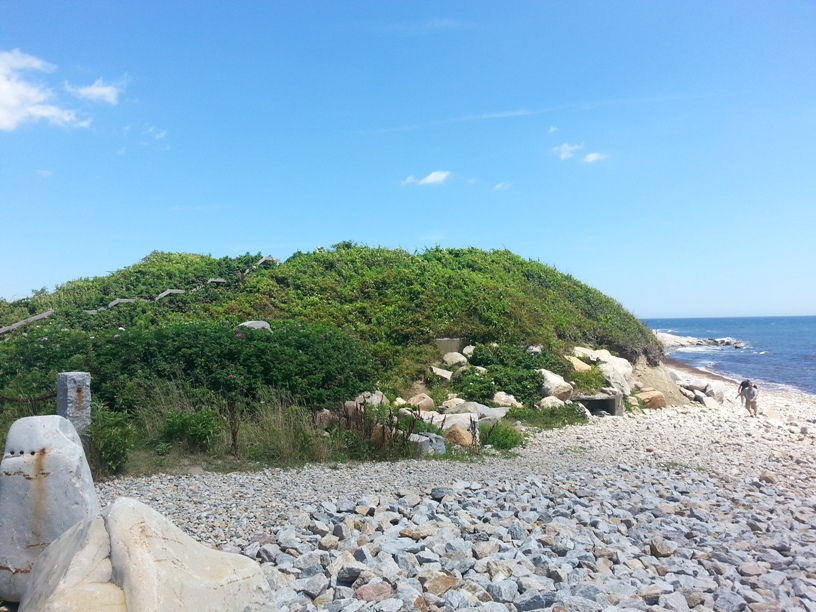
Ammunition and fire control bunker for Battery 211, former Fort Greene south reservation

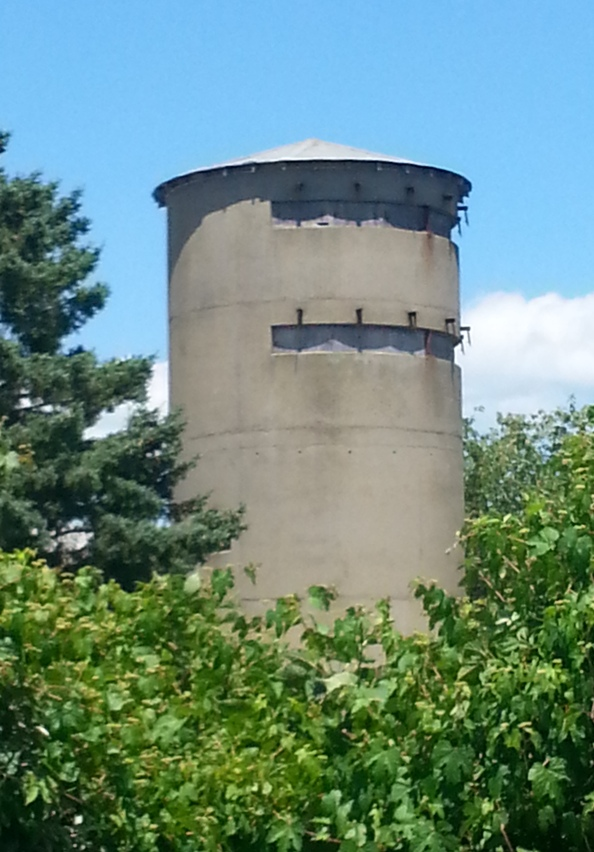
Former fire control tower resembling a barn silo, former Fort Greene west reservation

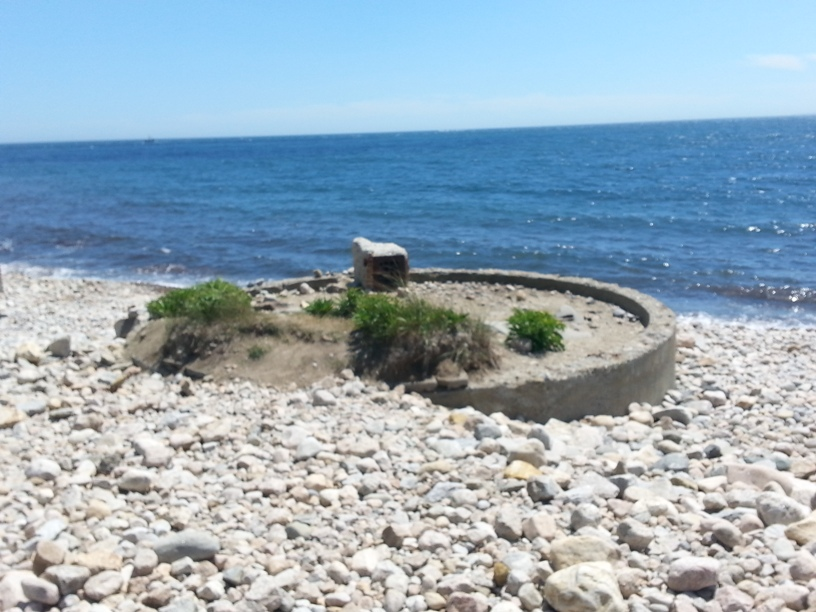
6-inch gun position at Battery 211, former Fort Greene south reservation
