= Roger Wheeler State Beach =

State beach in Washington County, Rhode Island

Roger W. Wheeler State Beach
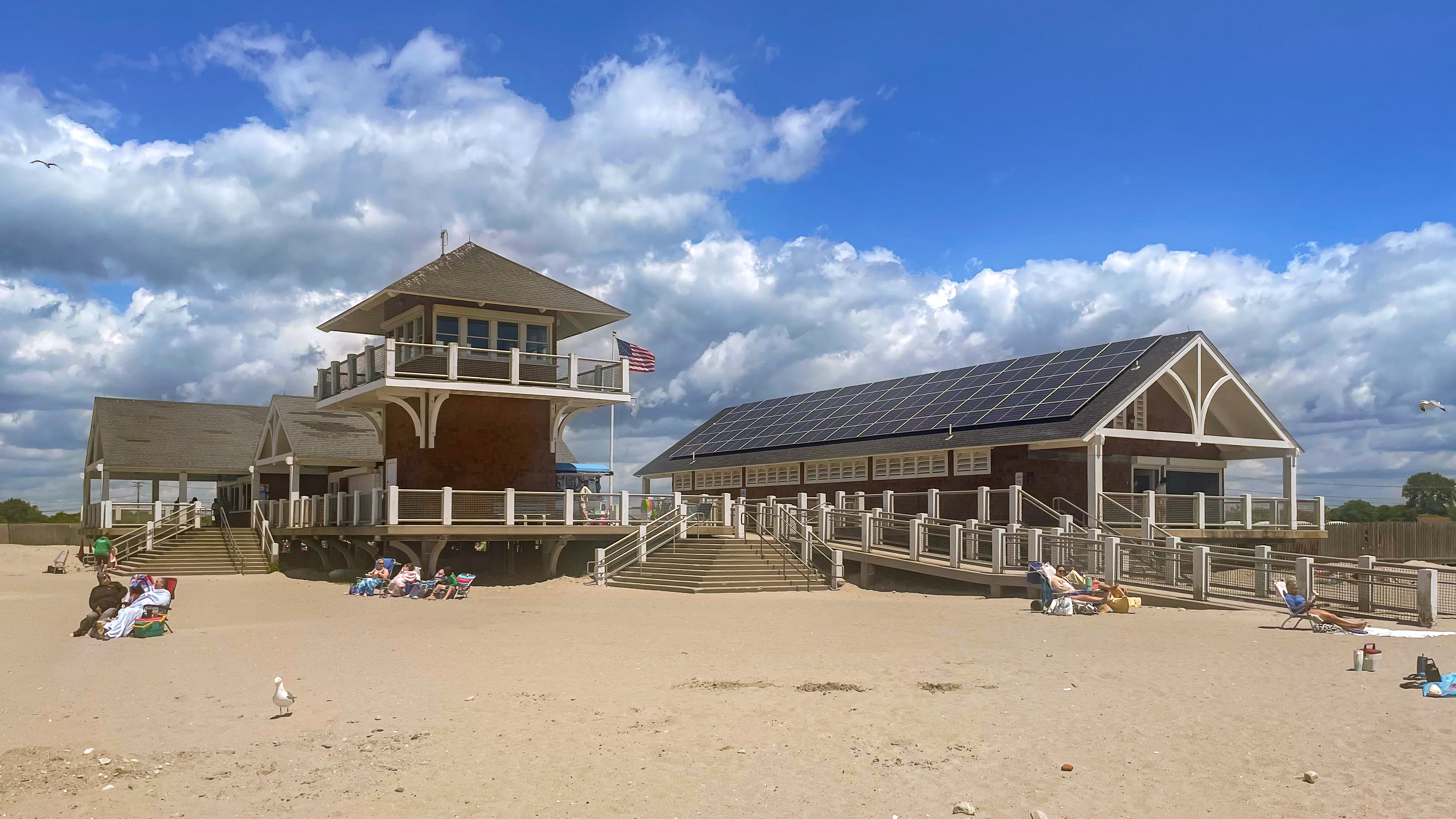

- Location within Rhode Island
- Interactive map of Roger W. Wheeler State Beach
- Location: Narragansett, Rhode Island, United States
- Coordinates: 41°22′15″N 71°29′48″W
- Area: 27 acres (11 ha)
- Elevation: 13 ft (4.0 m)
- Established: 1929
- Named for: The creator of the Rhode Island State Life-Saving System
- Administrator: Rhode Island Department of Environmental Management, Division of Parks & Recreation
- Website: Official website
- Rhode Island State Parks

Roger W. Wheeler State Beach (formerly and still sometimes referred to as Sand Hill Cove) is a public recreation area covering 27 acres (11 ha) on Block Island Sound in the town of Narragansett, Rhode Island, United States. The area offers picnicking, ocean swimming, and a playground and is open seasonally.

== History ==
The beach became state property when it was seized from Tory sympathizers during the American Revolutionary War. Known as Sand Hill Cove, it became Rhode Island's first state beach when 27 acres were transferred to Metropolitan Park Commission in 1929. In 1970, the beach was renamed in honor of Captain Roger W. Wheeler (1907-1969), the founder of the Rhode Island State Life-Saving System.
