= William Brenton =

Rhode Island colonial governor

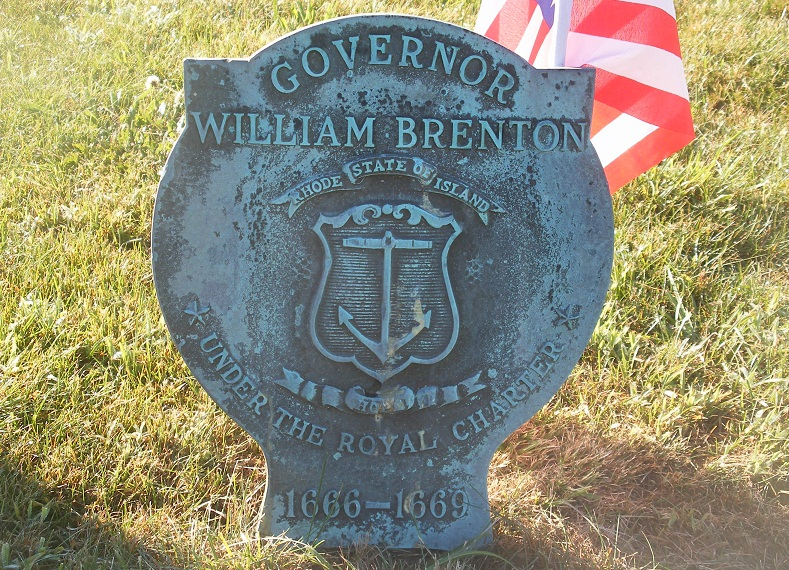
- Governor William Brenton grave medallion

11th President of the Colony of Rhode Island and Providence Plantations
- In office 1660–1662
- Preceded by: Benedict Arnold
- Succeeded by: Benedict Arnold

2nd Governor of the Colony of Rhode Island and Providence Plantations
- In office 1666–1669
- Preceded by: Benedict Arnold
- Succeeded by: Benedict Arnold

1st Deputy Governor of the Colony of Rhode Island and Providence Plantations
- In office 1663–1666
- Governor: Benedict Arnold
- Preceded by: position created
- Succeeded by: Nicholas Easton

Personal details
- Born: c. 1610
- Died: autumn, 1674 Newport, Rhode Island
- Spouse(s): (1) Dorothy ________ (2) Mary Burton
- Children: Barnabas, Martha, Mary, Elizabeth, Sarah, Mehitable, Jahleel, William, Abigail, Ebenezer
- Occupation: Builder, selectman, assistant, president, commissioner, deputy governor, governor

William Brenton (c. 1610–1674) was a colonial English statesman who served as colonial President, Deputy Governor, and Governor of the Colony of Rhode Island and Providence Plantations, and an early settler of Portsmouth and Newport in the Rhode Island colony. Believed to be from Hammersmith, Middlesex, England, he emigrated to the British Colonies in North America by 1633, and rose to minor prominence in the Massachusetts Bay Colony before relocating to a new settlement to the south that became today's Rhode Island.

== Origin ==
Austin and other historians give his place of origin as Hammersmith in Middlesex, England (now a part of London), but in reviewing the evidence, Anderson concludes that his place of origin is unknown. Brenton named one of his Newport properties "Hammersmith," and this has led some writers to assume that the like-named town since absorbed into London was his place of origin.

== Boston, Portsmouth and Newport ==
Brenton was in Boston by October 1633 when he was admitted to the church there, was made a freeman in May 1634, and later the same year was appointed to oversee the building of a jail house. He was a Boston selectman from 1634 to 1637, and in 1635, was appointed to a committee to consider the incident when Massachusetts magistrate John Endecott defaced the English flag, and to report to the court to what extent Endecott would be censured.

Brenton was a Deputy in Boston from 1635 to 1637, but following the settlement of Portsmouth on Aquidneck Island (called Rhode Island) by the followers of Anne Hutchinson, he became a resident there, and in late August 1638 was directed to oversee work on the prison. It appears that Brenton was not a follower of Hutchinson, or of her brother-in-law John Wheelwright, as he was not disarmed, and he also returned to live in Boston at a later time. In April 1639, he was one of nine men who signed an agreement to settle Newport, and appears to have changed residence, being present at a general meeting there a year later. However, by 1643 his residence was once again given as Portsmouth. From 1640 to 1647, while William Coddington was the governor of the two Aquidneck Island towns of Portsmouth and Newport, Brenton was the deputy governor. In February 1649, Brenton was again living in Boston, when he was given liberty to "set up a porch afore his house" there.

== Terms as president and governor ==
From 1652 to 1657, Brenton was once again a selectman, and in 1655, became a freeman of Newport. In 1660, he succeeded Benedict Arnold as President of all four towns of the Rhode Island colony, serving for two one-year terms, and also serving as a commissioner during this period. One issue facing this administration was the land speculation of Humphrey Atherton in the Narragansett country (later to become Washington County, Rhode Island). A committee was appointed to deal with Atherton and his company about his land purchase, and arrange terms upon which Atherton might enter the colony. If the Atherton company refused to confer, then they would be forbidden from entering their lands. The committee reported only partial progress on this issue, and would continue at a later session.

One of the first acts of Brenton's administration was to proclaim that King Charles II of England be recognized as the Supreme Civil Magistrate of the colony, and the day of October 21 was set aside as the date of public recognition for the new king. Also during this administration, a commission was issued to Dr. John Clarke, Rhode Island's agent and diplomat in London, with the intent of seeking a new charter from the king, and a committee of three members from each town drew up instructions for Dr. Clarke. The new charter, delivered from England in 1663 during the tenure of Brenton's successor, Benedict Arnold, was characterized by historian Thomas W. Bicknell as "the most liberal and enlightened charter the world had then known." When Arnold was named by the charter as the first Governor of the Colony of Rhode Island, Brenton was named as the first Deputy Governor. When Arnold stepped down as governor in 1666, Brenton became governor of the colony for three consecutive one-year terms.

== Later life and legacy ==
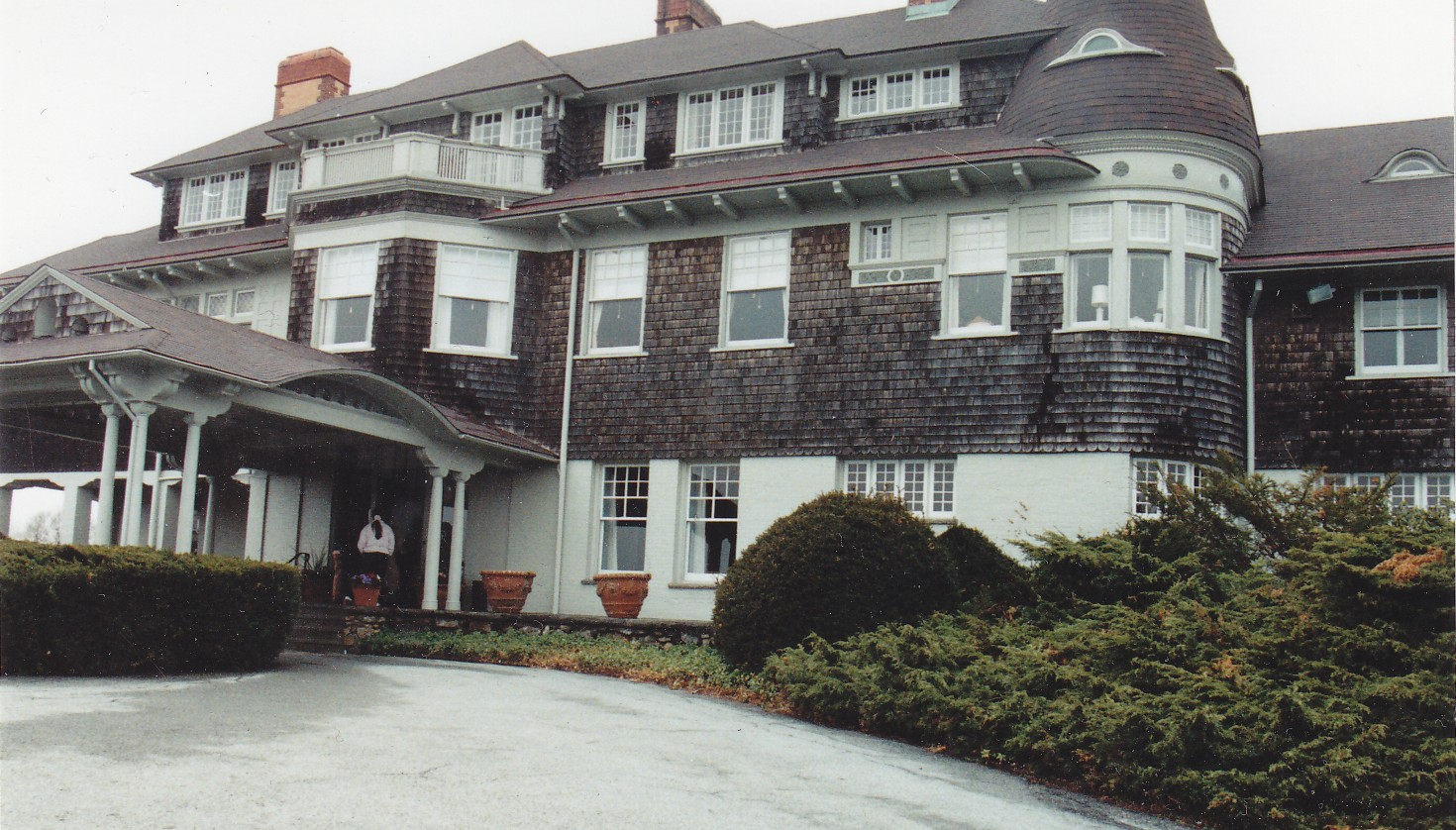
The main house at Hammersmith Farm

In 1658, Brenton was granted 8,000 acres of land on the Merrimack River, a tract which was called Brenton Farm and later became the town of Litchfield, New Hampshire. In 1670, he was residing in Taunton in the Plymouth Colony. Even though he was living in Taunton, in 1672 he was once again elected governor of the Rhode Island colony, in absentia, but refused to serve. He died sometime after September 25, 1674, when he was involved in a land deed, but before November 13 of that year when his will was proved at Newport, where he died. One source says he eventually became a member of the Quaker church, but this is not supported by Anderson who gives his church affiliation only as the Boston (Puritan) church. He had been a central and highly regarded member of the colony, serving as an office holder or legislator for nearly 40 years. Brenton's Point and Brenton's Reef in Newport are named after him, and Hammersmith Farm, where Jacqueline Bouvier spent an important part of her youth after her mother married its owner, Hugh D. Auchincloss, Jr., and later married future United States President John F. Kennedy, was named for his property in Newport.

== Family ==
Coat of Arms of William Brenton

Brenton was first married, by 1634, to a woman named Dorothy, who apparently died soon thereafter, leaving a single son, Barnabas, who was baptized in Boston on January 24, 1635. There is no further record of this son. Nearly a decade later, by about 1644, Brenton married Martha Burton, the daughter of Thomas Burton, with whom he had nine children. Martha died shortly before Brenton, in 1672 or 1673. Their daughter Mary married future colonial Rhode Island Governor Peleg Sanford, the son of John Sanford who succeeded William Coddington as governor of Portsmouth and Newport under the Coddington Commission. Their daughter Sarah married Joseph Eliot, the son of Puritan minister and missionary, John Eliot.

Brenton's son William (died 1697) had a son Jahleel (1691–1767), who served as the first commander of the Artillery Company of Newport. He married as his first wife, Frances Cranston, the daughter of Governor Samuel Cranston, and had 15 children, the eighth of whom was also named Jahleel. This Jahleel (1729–1802) was a loyalist during the American Revolution, lost his property in Newport, and became an admiral in the British navy. He in turn had a son, Sir Jahleel Brenton (1770–1844), who also had a distinguished career in the British Navy, attaining the rank of vice admiral. Brenton's son John was grandfather to Colonel James Brenton (1741-1782) who was a patriot in the Revolutionary war and died in battles against the native population in Kentucky.

== See also ==
- Brenton Point State Park
- Hammersmith Farm
- List of colonial governors of Rhode Island
- List of lieutenant governors of Rhode Island
- List of early settlers of Rhode Island
- Colony of Rhode Island and Providence Plantations
