= Scarborough Beach (Rhode Island) =

State beach in Washington County, Rhode Island

Scarborough State Beaches
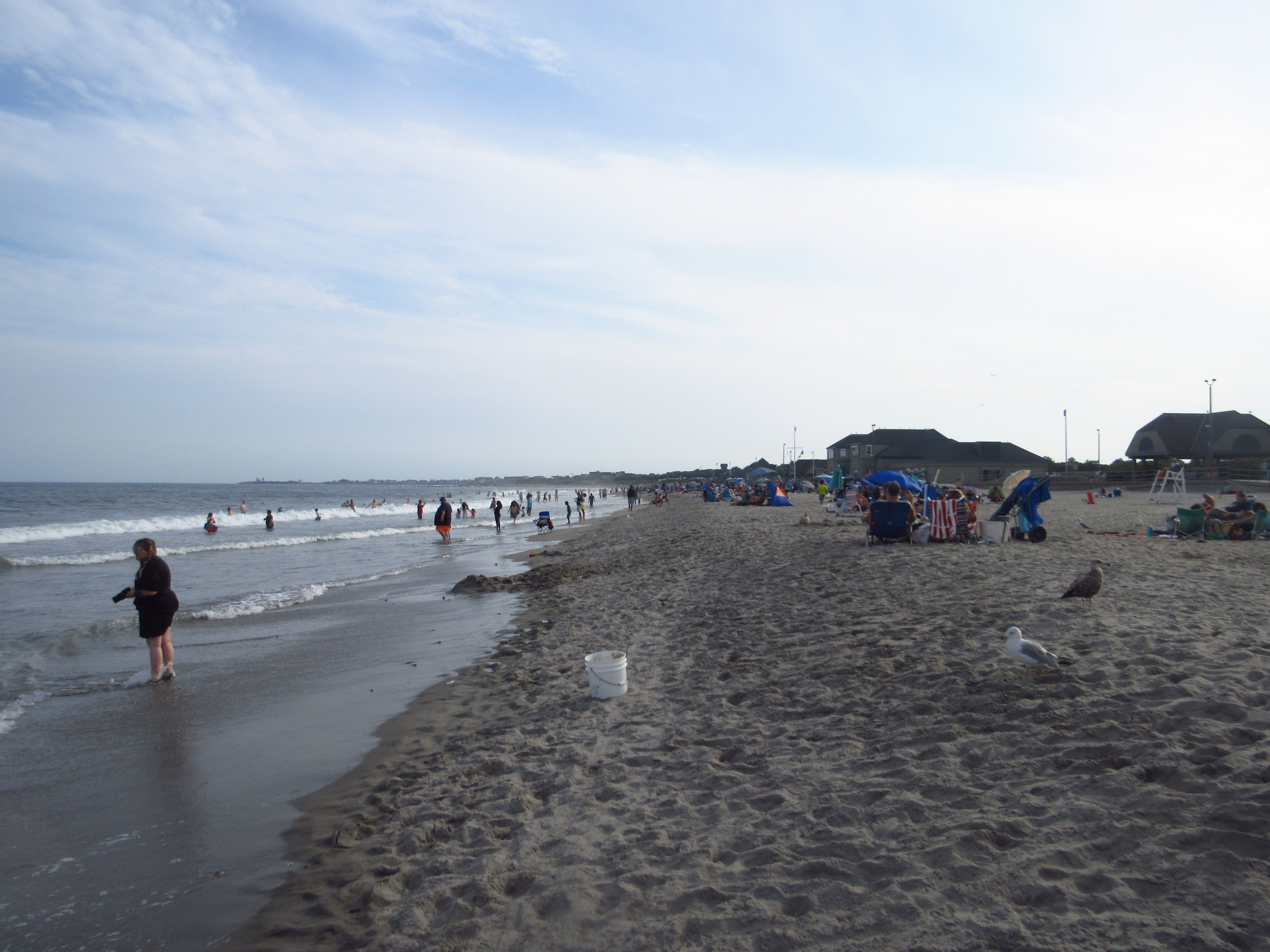

- Location within Rhode Island
- Interactive map of Scarborough State Beaches
- Location: Narragansett, Rhode Island, United States
- Coordinates: 41°23′23″N 71°28′23″W
- Area: 26 acres (11 ha) (North); 16 acres (6.5 ha) (South)
- Elevation: 10 ft (3.0 m)
- Established: 1937
- Administrator: Rhode Island Department of Environmental Management, Division of Parks & Recreation
- Website: Official website
- Rhode Island State Parks

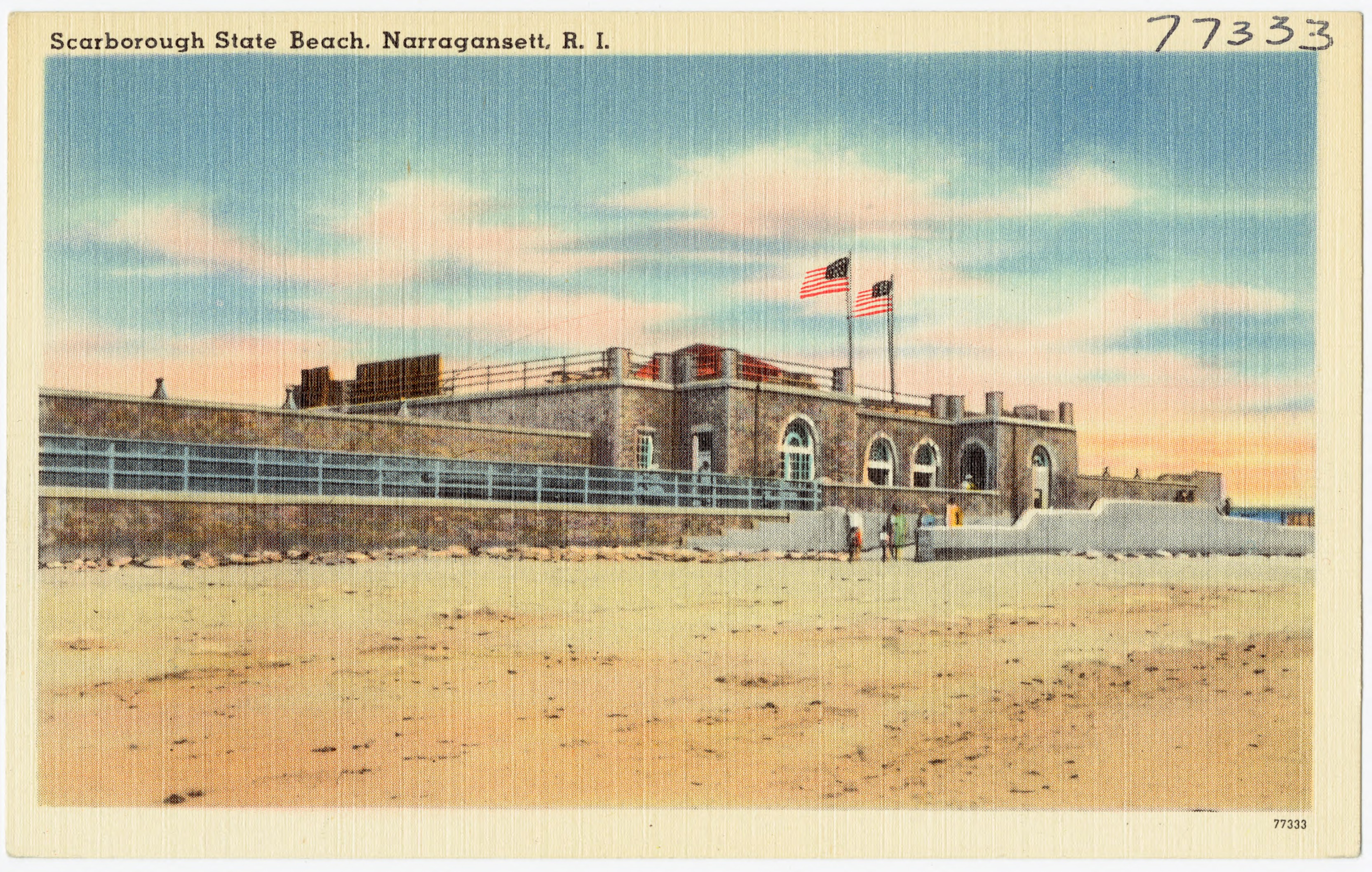
Historic postcard image of Scarborough Beach

Scarborough State Beach is a public recreation area fronting the Atlantic Ocean in the town of Narragansett, Rhode Island. The state park comprises two units located at 870 and 970 Ocean Road. The units offer saltwater bathing, picnicking, observation tower, and boardwalk and are open seasonally. The stone ruins of part of the Windswept Estate mansion also reside by the beach. The State Government purchased the ruins in an effort to preserve them and save them from demolition.

== History ==
The beach was first developed with a pavilion in 1937. The two-unit complex was created with the addition of a southern component when the state purchased 7-acre Lido's Beach in 1981 and 9-acre Olivo's Beach in 1986. Extensive renovations were completed in 1987.
