= 319th Regiment =

319th Regiment may refer to:

- 319th Cavalry Regiment, United States
- 319th Field Artillery Regiment, United States
  - 1st Battalion, 319th Field Artillery Regiment
  - 2nd Battalion, 319th Field Artillery Regiment
  - 3rd Battalion, 319th Field Artillery Regiment
  - 4th Battalion, 319th Field Artillery Regiment
