= U.S. Army Regimental System =

United States Army organization system

The United States Army Regimental System (USARS) is an organizational and classification system used by the United States Army. It was established in 1981 to replace the Combat Arms Regimental System (CARS) to provide each soldier with continuous identification with a single regiment, and to increase a soldier's probability of serving recurring assignments with their regiment. The USARS was intended to enhance combat effectiveness by providing the opportunity for a regimental affiliation, thus obtaining some of the benefits of the traditional regimental system.

== Overview ==
USARS was developed to include all combat, combat support (CS), combat service support (CSS), special branches, and training battalions in the Regular Army, Army National Guard, and Army Reserve.

It was developed to offer the opportunity for long-term identification with a regiment or corps, provide the potential for recurring assignments within a regiment or corps, provide the opportunity to further emphasize the history, customs, and traditions of the regiment or corps, and provide regiments that are structured as one or more continental United States (CONUS) units of like type linked with one or more units of like type outside the continental United States (OCONUS), or one or more units of like type located exclusively in either CONUS or OCONUS, including one or more training battalions or tactical armored cavalry or ranger regiments.

USARS is also designed to provide for CS, CSS, and special branches to operate on a “whole branch” concept as a corps or special branch, carrying on the activities and traditions of a regiment, offer regimental affiliation to allow soldiers the opportunity for continuous identification with a combat arms regiment, a corps, or special branch throughout their careers. USARS provides (through regimental affiliation) different opportunities for soldiers, depending upon which combat arms regiment they choose to be affiliated with or whether they affiliate with a CS or CSS corps or special branch. In addition, the regimental affiliation process allows combat arms soldiers to select the regiment of choice (soldiers can change their affiliation at any time); provides that CS, CSS, and special branch soldiers will automatically be affiliated with their corps or special branch; specifies that all soldiers will belong to a regiment or corps; permits no limit to the number of soldiers who can be affiliated with a regiment or corps; and provides that DA civilians can automatically be affiliated with a regiment or corps by direction of the regiment or corps commander.

== Combat arms ==
=== Concept ===
Combat arms is a rescinded doctrinal term, though colloquially it includes air defense artillery, armor, aviation, cyber, field artillery, infantry, and special forces regiments. Combat arms soldiers may affiliate with any of the combat arms regiments consistent with their primary military occupational specialty (PMOS), specialty code, special qualification identifiers (SQI), or additional skill identifiers (ASI). Soldiers will have greater opportunities to serve recurring assignments in their regiments if regiments are chosen that have battalions in both CONUS and OCONUS locations. Since there is no ceiling on the number of soldiers who can affiliate with a particular regiment, the potential for recurring assignments to regiments is diminished where the number of affiliated soldiers exceeds the requirements.

=== Affiliation policy ===
Quoting from Chapter 3–2, page 7 of Army Regulation 600-82, U.S. Army Regimental System (note: Currently the regulation for The U.S. Army Regimental System is Army Regulation 870-21):

1. USARS regiments offered to active Army and USAR soldiers for affiliation are listed [below].
  1. All active Army soldiers are required to affiliate with a regiment. Although affiliation is mandatory, the choice of regiment is left up to the individual. Officers who are single-tracked in a Functional Area will affiliate with a regiment associated with their basic combat arms branch. Functional Area officers who have no basic branch will submit request for regimental affiliation using procedures outlined below. Regimental affiliation is based on the Army branch associated with a soldier’s PMOS or specialty. AR 670–1 contains a listing of all PMOS and corresponding branches for each. Army recruiters who have been assigned the SQI“4” will affiliate with a regiment associated with their PMOS. Recruiters or retention noncommissioned officers (NCOs) will be affiliated with The Adjutant General Corps. Regimental affiliation may be changed at any time; however, the regimental selection must be associated with the soldier’s PMOS or specialty.
  2. All combat arms officers and soldiers will affiliate with a regiment upon arrival at their first unit of assignment. These Soldiers will be affiliated with their regiment of assignment unless they voluntarily select another. Combat arms officers and soldiers whose initial Army assignment is not to a regimental unit may defer selection until they are so assigned.
  3. Enlisted soldiers may elect the Regiment of Choice Reenlistment Option under AR 601–280.
  4. Soldiers who deliberately terminate airborne status after affiliating with an airborne regiment will change their affiliation to a non-airborne regiment at the time of their termination. Those who are terminated for medical reasons may retain their regimental affiliation with an airborne regiment if they desire; however, such affiliation will be ceremonial and will not affect subsequent assignments.
  5. Regimental affiliation will be a primary assignment consideration for officers and enlisted soldiers. To the maximum extent possible, soldiers who are regimentally affiliated will be assigned to their regimental units. No assignment guarantees will be made, as Army requirements and soldier professional development needs must be met; however, it is incumbent upon commanders and the personnel community to make every effort to ensure that requisitions are submitted for and filled with affiliated regimental Soldiers and that soldiers are subsequently assigned within their regiments. (See AR 614–100, and AR 614–185 for officers, and AR 614–200 for enlisted soldiers).
2. Specific procedures for affiliation are below. These procedures permit affiliation and change of affiliation to be administered at the local Personnel Service Center (PSC) level.
3. Active Army soldiers who are accessioned into the USAR will retain their regimental affiliation unless they elect to change their affiliation, which may be done at any time.

== Combat arms regiments ==
Note: There are currently 178 USARS regiments, with only 47 consisting of units at multiple locations. Some of the regimental battalions are assigned to brigade combat teams in multiple divisions. Only 27 of these regiments meet the USARS "Conus/Oconus goal." Additionally, the term "Regiment" was not officially appended to a USARS regiment's official name/designation (and was not used under CARS) until 2005.

=== Artillery regiments ===
==== Air defense artillery regiments ====
- 1st Air Defense Artillery Regiment
  - 1st Battalion, 38th Air Defense Artillery Brigade, Kadena Air Base, Japan
  - 2nd Battalion, 35th Air Defense Artillery Brigade, Camp Carroll, South Korea
- 2nd Air Defense Artillery Regiment
  - Battery A, 11th Air Defense Artillery Brigade, Fort Bliss, Texas
  - Battery B, 11th Air Defense Artillery Brigade, Fort Bliss, Texas
  - Battery D, 35th Air Defense Artillery Brigade, Camp Carroll, South Korea
  - 3rd Battalion, 31st Air Defense Artillery Brigade, Fort Sill, Oklahoma
- 3rd Air Defense Artillery Regiment
  - 4th Battalion, 31st Air Defense Artillery Brigade, Fort Sill, Oklahoma
- 4th Air Defense Artillery Regiment
  - Battery A, 11th Air Defense Artillery Brigade, Fort Bliss, Texas
  - 3rd Battalion, 108th Air Defense Artillery Brigade, Fort Bragg, North Carolina
- 5th Air Defense Artillery Regiment
  - 4th Battalion, 69th Air Defense Artillery Brigade, Fort Hood, Texas
  - 5th Battalion, 31st Air Defense Artillery Brigade, Fort Sill, Oklahoma
- 6th Air Defense Artillery Regiment (Training Regiment)
  - 2nd Battalion, 30th Air Defense Artillery Brigade, Fort Sill, Oklahoma
  - 3rd Battalion, 30th Air Defense Artillery Brigade, Fort Sill, Oklahoma
- 7th Air Defense Artillery Regiment
  - 1st Battalion, 108th Air Defense Artillery Brigade, Fort Bragg, North Carolina
  - 5th Battalion, 52nd Air Defense Artillery Brigade, Germany
- 43rd Air Defense Artillery Regiment
  - 1st Battalion, 11th Air Defense Artillery Brigade, Fort Bliss, Texas
  - 2nd Battalion, 11th Air Defense Artillery Brigade, Fort Bliss, Texas
  - 3rd Battalion, 11th Air Defense Artillery Brigade, Fort Bliss, Texas
- 44th Air Defense Artillery Regiment
  - 1st Battalion, 69th Air Defense Artillery Brigade, Fort Hood, Texas
  - 2nd Battalion, 108th Air Defense Artillery Brigade, Fort Campbell, Kentucky
- 52nd Air Defense Artillery Regiment
  - 5th Battalion, 11th Air Defense Artillery Brigade, Fort Bliss, Texas
  - 6th Battalion, 35th Air Defense Artillery Brigade, Camp Humphreys, South Korea
- 55th Air Defense Artillery Regiment
  - 2nd Battalion, 108th Air Defense Artillery Brigade, Fort Bragg, North Carolina
- 56th Air Defense Artillery Regiment
  - 6th Battalion, 1st Cavalry Division, Fort Hood, Texas
- 57th Air Defense Artillery Regiment
  - 1st Battalion, 52nd Air Defense Artillery Brigade, Germany
- 62nd Air Defense Artillery Regiment
  - 1st Battalion, 69th Air Defense Artillery Brigade, Fort Hood, Texas

==== Field artillery regiments ====
- 1st Field Artillery Regiment
  - 4th Battalion, 3rd BCT, 1st Armored Division, Fort Bliss, Texas
- 2nd Field Artillery Regiment
  - 2nd Battalion, 428th Field Artillery Brigade, Fort Sill, Oklahoma
- 3rd Field Artillery Regiment
  - 2nd Battalion, 1st ABCT, 1st Armored Division, Fort Bliss, Texas
  - 5th Battalion, 17th Field Artillery Brigade, I Corps, Joint Base Lewis-McChord, Washington
- 4th Field Artillery Regiment
- 5th Field Artillery Regiment
  - 1st Battalion, 1st BCT, 1st Infantry Division, Fort Riley, Kansas
- 6th Field Artillery Regiment
  - 3rd Battalion, 1st BCT, 10th Mountain Division (Light Infantry), Fort Drum, New York
- 7th Field Artillery Regiment
  - 1st Battalion, 2nd BCT, 1st Infantry Division, Fort Riley, Kansas
  - 3rd Battalion, 3rd BCT, 25th Infantry Division, Schofield Barracks, Hawaii
- 8th Field Artillery Regiment
  - 2nd Battalion, 1st BCT, 25th Infantry Division, Fort Wainwright, Alaska
- 9th Field Artillery Regiment
  - 1st Battalion, 2nd BCT, 3rd Infantry Division, Fort Stewart, Georgia
- 10th Field Artillery Regiment
- 11th Field Artillery Regiment
  - 2nd Battalion, 2nd BCT, 25th Infantry Division, Schofield Barracks, Hawaii
- 12th Field Artillery Regiment
  - 2nd Battalion, 1st BCT, 4th Infantry Division, Fort Carson, Colorado
- 13th Field Artillery Regiment
  - 3rd Battalion, 75th Field Artillery Brigade, Fort Sill, Oklahoma
- 14th Field Artillery Regiment
- 15th Field Artillery Regiment
  - 1st Battalion, 1st BCT, 2nd Infantry Division, South Korea
  - 2nd Battalion, 2nd BCT, 10th Mountain Division (Light Infantry), Fort Drum, New York
- 16th Field Artillery Regiment
  - 3rd Battalion, 2nd BCT, 1st Cavalry Division, Fort Hood, Texas
- 17th Field Artillery Regiment
  - 1st Battalion, 75th Field Artillery Brigade, Fort Sill, Oklahoma
  - 3rd Battalion, 2nd BCT, 2nd Infantry Division, Joint Base Lewis-McChord, Washington
- 18th Field Artillery Regiment
  - 2nd Battalion, 75th Field Artillery Brigade, Fort Sill, Oklahoma
- 19th Field Artillery Regiment
  - 1st Battalion, 434th Field Artillery Brigade, Fort Sill, Oklahoma
- 20th Field Artillery Regiment
  - 2nd Battalion, 41st Field Artillery Brigade, Fort Hood, Texas
- 21st Field Artillery Regiment
  - 1st Battalion, 41st Field Artillery Brigade, Fort Hood, Texas
- 22nd Field Artillery Regiment
  - 1st Battalion, 434th Field Artillery Brigade, Fort Sill, Oklahoma
- 25th Field Artillery Regiment
  - 5th Battalion, 3rd BCT, 10th Mountain Division (Light Infantry), Fort Polk, Louisiana
- 26th Field Artillery Regiment
  - Battery A (Target Acquisition), 41st Field Artillery Brigade, V Corps, Grafenwohr, Germany
  - Battery B (Target Acquisition), 212th Field Artillery Brigade, III Corps, Fort Bliss, Texas
  - Battery C (Target Acquisition), 75th Field Artillery Brigade, III Corps, Fort Sill, Oklahoma
  - Battery D (Target Acquisition), 18th Field Artillery Brigade, XVIII Airborne Corps, Fort Bragg, North Carolina
  - Battery F (Target Acquisition), 17th Field Artillery Brigade, I Corps, Fort Lewis, Washington
- 27th Field Artillery Regiment
  - 3rd Battalion, 18th Field Artillery Brigade, XVIII Airborne Corps, Fort Bragg, North Carolina
  - 4th Battalion, 2nd BCT, 1st Armored Division, Fort Bliss, Texas
- 29th Field Artillery Regiment
  - 2nd Battalion, 4th BCT, 1st Armored Division, Fort Bliss, Texas
  - 3rd Battalion, 3rd BCT, 4th Infantry Division, Fort Carson, Colorado
- 30th Field Artillery Regiment
  - 1st Battalion, 428th Field Artillery Brigade, Fort Sill, Oklahoma
- 32nd Field Artillery Regiment
  - 2nd Battalion, 4th BCT, 1st Infantry Division, Fort Riley, Kansas
- 37th Field Artillery Regiment
  - 1st Battalion, 3rd BCT (Stryker), 2nd Infantry Division, Fort Lewis, Washington
  - 6th Battalion, 210th Field Artillery Brigade, 2nd Infantry Division, South Korea
- 38th Field Artillery Regiment
  - 1st Battalion, 210th Field Artillery Brigade, 2nd Infantry Division, South Korea
- 40th Field Artillery Regiment
  - 1st Battalion, 434th Field Artillery Brigade, Fort Sill, Oklahoma
- 41st Field Artillery Regiment
  - 1st Battalion, 1st BCT, 3rd Infantry Division, Fort Stewart, Georgia
- 42nd Field Artillery Regiment
  - 4th Battalion, 1st BCT, 4th Infantry Division, Carson, Colorado
- 76th Field Artillery Regiment
- 77th Field Artillery Regiment
  - 2nd Battalion, 4th BCT, 4th Infantry Division, Fort Carson, Colorado
- 78th Field Artillery Regiment
  - 1st Battalion, 428th Field Artillery Brigade, Fort Sill, Oklahoma
- 79th Field Artillery Regiment
  - 1st Battalion, 434th Field Artillery Brigade, Fort Sill, Oklahoma
- 82nd Field Artillery Regiment
  - 1st Battalion, 1st BCT, 1st Cavalry Division, Fort Hood, Texas
  - 2nd Battalion, 3rd BCT, 1st Cavalry Division, Fort Hood, Texas
- 84th Field Artillery Regiment
- 94th Field Artillery Regiment
  - 1st Battalion, 17th Field Artillery Brigade, I Corps, Joint Base Lewis-Mcchord, Washington
- 194th Field Artillery Regiment
  - 1st Battalion, 2nd BCT, 34th Infantry Division, Fort Dodge, Iowa
- 319th Field Artillery Regiment (Airborne)
  - 1st Battalion, 3rd BCT, 82nd Airborne Division, Fort Bragg, North Carolina
  - 2nd Battalion, 2nd BCT, 82nd Airborne Division, Fort Bragg, North Carolina
  - 3rd Battalion, 1st BCT, 82nd Airborne Division, Fort Bragg, North Carolina
  - 4th Battalion, 173rd ABCT, Grafenwoehr, Germany
- 320th Field Artillery Regiment (Air Assault)
  - 1st Battalion, 2nd BCT, 101st Airborne Division (Air Assault), Fort Campbell, Kentucky
  - 2nd Battalion, 1st BCT, 101st Airborne Division (Air Assault), Fort Campbell, Kentucky
  - 3rd Battalion, 3rd BCT, 101st Airborne Division (Air Assault), Fort Campbell, Kentucky
- 321st Field Artillery Regiment
  - 1st Battalion (Airborne), 18th Field Artillery Brigade, XVIII Airborne Corps, Fort Bragg, North Carolina
  - 3rd Battalion, 18th Field Artillery Brigade, XVIII Airborne Corps, Fort Bragg, North Carolina
- 333rd Field Artillery Regiment
  - Battery F (Target Acquisition), 210th Field Artillery Brigade, 2nd Infantry Division, South Korea
- 377th Field Artillery Regiment
  - 1st Battalion, 17th Field Artillery Brigade, I Corps, Joint Base Lewis-McChord, Washington
  - 2nd Battalion (Airborne), 4th BCT, 25th Infantry Division, Fort Richardson, Alaska

=== Armored and cavalry regiments ===
==== Armored regiments ====
- 34th Armored Regiment
  - 2nd Battalion, 1st BCT, 1st Infantry Division, Fort Riley, Kansas
- 35th Armored Regiment
  - 1st Battalion, 2nd BCT, 1st Armored Division, Fort Bliss, Texas
- 37th Armored Regiment
  - 1st Battalion, 2nd BCT, 1st Armored Division, Fort Bliss, Texas
  - 2nd Battalion, 1st BCT, 1st Armored Division, Fort Bliss, Texas
- 63rd Armored Regiment
  - 1st Battalion, 2nd BCT, 1st Infantry Division, Fort Riley, Kansas
- 64th Armored Regiment
  - 1st Battalion, 1st BCT, 3rd Infantry Division, Fort Stewart, Georgia
- 66th Armored Regiment
  - 1st Battalion, 3rd BCT, 4th Infantry Division, Fort Carson, Colorado
  - 3rd Battalion, 1st BCT, 1st Infantry Division, Fort Riley, Kansas
- 67th Armored Regiment
  - 1st Battalion, 3rd BCT, 1st Armored Division, Fort Bliss, Texas
  - 3rd Battalion, 2nd BCT, 3rd Infantry Division, Fort Stewart, Georgia
- 68th Armored Regiment
  - 1st Battalion, 3rd BCT, 4th Infantry Division, Fort Carson, Colorado
  - Company A, 4th Battalion, 1st BCT, 82nd Airborne Division, Fort Bragg
- 69th Armored Regiment
  - 2nd Battalion, 2nd BCT, 3rd Infantry Division, Fort Benning, Georgia
  - 3rd Battalion, 1st BCT, 3rd Infantry Division, Fort Stewart, Georgia
- 70th Armored Regiment
  - 2nd Battalion, 2nd BCT, 1st Infantry Division, Fort Riley, Kansas
  - 4th Battalion, 1st BCT, 1st Armored Division, Fort Bliss, Texas
- 72nd Armored Regiment
  - No active Battalions
- 77th Armored Regiment
  - 1st Battalion, 4th BCT, 1st Armored Division, Fort Bliss, Texas
- 81st Armored Regiment (Training Regiment)
  - 1st Battalion, 194th Armored Brigade, Fort Benning, Georgia
  - 3rd Battalion, 199th Infantry Brigade, Fort Benning, Georgia

==== Cavalry regiments ====
- 1st Cavalry Regiment
  - 1st Squadron (Armored), 2nd BCT, 1st Armored Division, Fort Bliss, Texas
  - 2nd Squadron (Stryker), 1st BCT, 4th Infantry Division, Fort Carson, Colorado
  - 3rd Squadron (Deactivated), last assigned to 3rd Infantry Division, Fort Stewart, Georgia
  - 4th Squadron (Inactive), United States Military Academy, West Point, New York
  - 5th Squadron (Stryker), 1st BCT, 25th Infantry Division, Fort Wainwright, Alaska
  - 6th Squadron (Armored), 1st ABCT, 1st Armored Division, Fort Bliss, Texas
  - 7th Squadron (Deactivated), last assigned to 194th Armored Brigade, Fort Knox, Kentucky
  - 8th Squadron (Stryker), 2nd BCT, 2nd Infantry Division, Fort Lewis, Washington
- 2nd Cavalry Regiment (Stryker Brigade Combat Team)
  - 1st Squadron (Stryker), 2nd Cavalry Regiment, Vilseck, Germany
  - 2nd Squadron (Stryker), 2nd Cavalry Regiment, Vilseck, Germany
  - 3rd Squadron (Stryker), 2nd Cavalry Regiment, Vilseck, Germany
  - 4th Squadron (Stryker), 2nd Cavalry Regiment, Vilseck, Germany
  - Field Artillery Squadron, 2nd Cavalry Regiment, Vilseck, Germany
  - Engineer Squadron, 2nd Cavalry Regiment, Grafenwoehr, Germany
  - Support Squadron, 2nd Cavalry Regiment, Vilseck, Germany
- 3rd Cavalry Regiment (Stryker Brigade Combat Team)
  - 1st Squadron (Stryker), 3rd Cavalry Regiment, Fort Hood, Texas
  - 2nd Squadron (Stryker), 3rd Cavalry Regiment, Fort Hood, Texas
  - 3rd Squadron (Stryker), 3rd Cavalry Regiment, Fort Hood, Texas
  - 4th Squadron (Stryker), 3rd Cavalry Regiment, Fort Hood, Texas
  - Field Artillery Squadron, 3rd Cavalry Regiment, Fort Hood, Texas
  - Engineer Squadron, 3rd Cavalry Regiment, Fort Hood, Texas
  - Support Squadron, 3rd Cavalry Regiment, Fort Hood, Texas
- 4th Cavalry Regiment
  - 1st Squadron (Armored), 1st BCT, 1st Infantry Division, Fort Riley, Kansas
  - 3rd Squadron (Light), 3rd BCT, 25th Infantry Division, Schofield Barracks, Hawaii
  - 5th Squadron (Armored), 2nd BCT, 1st Infantry Division, Fort Riley, Kansas
- 5th Cavalry Regiment
  - 1st Battalion (Combined Arms), 2nd BCT, 1st Cavalry Division, Fort Hood, Texas
  - 2nd Battalion (Combined Arms), 1st BCT, 1st Cavalry Division, Fort Hood, Texas
- 6th Cavalry Regiment
  - 1st Squadron, Combat Aviation Brigade, 1st Infantry Division, Fort Riley, Kansas
  - 2nd Squadron, Combat Aviation Brigade, 25th Infantry Division, Wheeler Army Air Field, Hawaii
  - 3rd Squadron, 1AD Combat Aviation Brigade, Fort Bliss, TX
  - 4th Squadron, 16th Combat Aviation Brigade, Joint Base Lewis-McChord, Washington
  - 6th Squadron, Combat Aviation Brigade, 10th Mountain Division (Light Infantry), Fort Drum, New York
- 7th Cavalry Regiment
  - 1st Squadron (Armored), 1st BCT, 1st Cavalry Division, Fort Hood, Texas
  - 2nd Battalion (Combined Arms), 3rd BCT, 1st Cavalry Division, Fort Hood, Texas
  - 5th Squadron (Armored), 1st BCT, 3rd Infantry Division, Fort Stewart, Georgia
- 8th Cavalry Regiment
  - 1st Battalion (Combined Arms), 2nd BCT, 1st Cavalry Division, Fort Hood, Texas
  - 2nd Battalion (Combined Arms), 1st BCT, 1st Cavalry Division, Fort Hood, Texas
  - 3rd Battalion (Combined Arms), 3rd BCT, 1st Cavalry Division, Fort Hood, Texas
  - 6th Squadron (Armored), 2nd BCT, 3rd Infantry Division, Fort Stewart, Georgia
- 9th Cavalry Regiment
  - 1st Battalion (Combined Arms), 2nd BCT, 1st Cavalry Division, Fort Hood, Texas
  - 4th Squadron (Armored), 2nd BCT, 1st Cavalry Division, Fort Hood, Texas
  - 6th Squadron (Armored), 3rd BCT, 1st Cavalry Division, Fort Hood, Texas
- 10th Cavalry Regiment
  - 2nd Squadron (Stryker), 1st BCT, 4th Infantry Division, Fort Carson, Colorado
  - 4th Squadron (Armored), 3rd BCT, 4th Infantry Division, Fort Carson, Colorado
- 11th Armored Cavalry Regiment
  - 1st Squadron (OPFOR), Fort Irwin, California
  - 2nd Squadron (OPFOR), Fort Irwin, California
  - Regimental Support Squadron, Fort Irwin, California
- 12th Cavalry Regiment
  - 1st Battalion (Combined Arms), 3rd BCT, 1st Cavalry Division, Fort Hood, Texas
  - 2nd Battalion (Combined Arms), 1st BCT, 1st Cavalry Division, Fort Hood, Texas
- 13th Cavalry Regiment
  - 2nd Squadron (Armored), 3rd BCT, 1st Armored Division, Fort Bliss, Texas
- 14th Cavalry Regiment
  - 1st Squadron (Stryker), 3rd BCT, 2nd Infantry Division, Fort Lewis, Washington
  - 2nd Squadron (Light), 2nd BCT, 25th Infantry Division, Schofield Barracks, Hawaii
- 15th Cavalry Regiment (Training Regiment)
  - 2nd Squadron(OSUT), 194th Armored Brigade, Fort Benning, Georgia
  - 5th Squadron(OSUT), 194th Armored Brigade, Fort Benning, Georgia
- 16th Cavalry Regiment (Training Regiment)
  - 1st Squadron, 316th Cavalry Brigade, Fort Benning, Georgia
  - 2nd Squadron, 316th Cavalry Brigade, Fort Benning, Georgia
  - 3rd Squadron, 316th Cavalry Brigade, Fort Benning, Georgia
- 17th Cavalry Regiment
  - 1st Squadron, Combat Aviation Brigade, 82nd Airborne Division, Fort Bragg, North Carolina
  - 2nd Squadron, Combat Aviation Brigade, 101st Airborne Division (Air Assault), Fort Campbell, Kentucky
  - 3rd Squadron, Combat Aviation Brigade, 3rd Infantry Division, Fort Stewart, Georgia
  - 5th Squadron, Combat Aviation Brigade, 2nd Infantry Division, Camp Humphreys, South Korea.
  - 6th Squadron, Combat Aviation Brigade, 4th Infantry Division, Fort Carson, Colorado
  - 7th Squadron, Combat Aviation Brigade, 1st Cavalry Division, Fort Hood, Texas
- 32nd Cavalry Regiment
  - 1st Squadron (Light), 1st BCT, 101st Airborne Division (Air Assault), Fort Campbell, Kentucky
- 33rd Cavalry Regiment
  - 1st Squadron (Light), 3rd BCT, 101st Airborne Division (Air Assault), Fort Campbell, Kentucky
- 38th Cavalry Regiment
  - 1st Squadron (Light), 1st Security Force Assistance Brigade, Fort Benning, GA
- 40th Cavalry Regiment
  - 1st Squadron (Light), 4th BCT (Airborne), 25th Infantry Division, Fort Richardson, Alaska
- 61st Cavalry Regiment
  - 3rd Squadron (Light), 2nd BCT, 4th Infantry Division, Fort Carson, Colorado
- 71st Cavalry Regiment
  - 3rd Squadron (Light), 1st BCT, 10th Mountain Division (Light Infantry), Fort Drum, New York
- 73rd Cavalry Regiment
  - 1st Squadron (Light), 2nd BCT, 82nd Airborne Division, Fort Bragg, North Carolina
  - 3rd Squadron (Light), 1st BCT, 82nd Airborne Division, Fort Bragg, North Carolina
  - 5th Squadron (Light), 3rd BCT, 82nd Airborne Division, Fort Bragg, North Carolina
- 75th Cavalry Regiment
  - 1st Squadron (Light), 2nd BCT, 101st Airborne Division (Air Assault), Fort Campbell, Kentucky
- 89th Cavalry Regiment
  - 1st Squadron (Light), 2nd BCT, 10th Mountain Division (Light Infantry), Fort Drum, New York
  - 3rd Squadron (Light), 3rd BCT, 10th Mountain Division (Light Infantry), Fort Polk, Louisiana
- 91st Cavalry Regiment
  - 1st Squadron (Light), 173rd BCT (Airborne), Grafenwoehr, Germany

=== Aviation regiments ===
- 1st Aviation Regiment
  - 1st Battalion, Combat Aviation Brigade, 1st Infantry Division, Fort Riley, Kansas
  - 2nd Battalion, Combat Aviation Brigade, 1st Infantry Division, Fort Riley, Kansas
  - 3rd Battalion, Combat Aviation Brigade, 1st Infantry Division, Fort Riley, Kansas
- 2nd Aviation Regiment
  - 1st Battalion (Attack), Attack Reconnaissance Battalion, 2nd Infantry Division, Fort Carson, Colorado
  - 2nd Battalion (Assault), Combat Aviation Brigade, 2nd Infantry Division, K-16 Air Base, Seongnam, South Korea
  - 3rd Battalion (General Support), Combat Aviation Brigade, 2nd Infantry Division, Camp Humphreys, Pyeongtaek, South Korea
  - 4th Battalion (Attack), Combat Aviation Brigade, 2nd Infantry Division, Camp Humphreys, Pyeongtaek, South Korea
- 3rd Aviation Regiment
  - 1st Battalion, 12th Combat Aviation Brigade, Katterbach Army Airfield, Germany
  - 2nd Battalion, Combat Aviation Brigade, 3rd Infantry Division, Fort Stewart, Georgia
  - 4th Battalion, Combat Aviation Brigade, 3rd Infantry Division, Fort Stewart, Georgia
- 4th Aviation Regiment
  - 1st Battalion, Combat Aviation Brigade, 4th Infantry Division, Fort Carson, Colorado
  - 2nd Battalion, Combat Aviation Brigade, 4th Infantry Division, Fort Carson, Colorado
  - 3rd Battalion, Combat Aviation Brigade, 4th Infantry Division, Fort Carson, Colorado
  - 4th Battalion, Combat Aviation Brigade, 4th Infantry Division, Fort Carson, Colorado
- 10th Aviation Regiment
  - 1st Battalion, Combat Aviation Brigade, 10th Mountain Division (Light Infantry), Fort Drum, New York
  - 2nd Battalion, Combat Aviation Brigade, 10th Mountain Division (Light Infantry), Fort Drum, New York
  - 3rd Battalion, Combat Aviation Brigade, 10th Mountain Division (Light Infantry), Fort Drum, New York
- 11th Aviation Regiment (Training)
  - 1st Battalion, 110th Aviation Brigade, Fort Novosel, Alabama
- 13th Aviation Regiment (Training)
  - 1st Battalion, 1st Aviation Brigade, Fort Novosel, Alabama
  - 2nd Battalion, 1st Aviation Brigade, Fort Novosel, Alabama
- 14th Aviation Regiment (Training Regiment)
  - 1st Battalion, 110th Aviation Brigade, Fort Novosel, Alabama
- 25th Aviation Regiment
  - 1st Battalion, 16th Combat Aviation Brigade, Fort Wainwright, Alaska
  - 2nd Battalion, Combat Aviation Brigade, 25th Infantry Division, Wheeler Field, Hawaii
  - 3rd Battalion, Combat Aviation Brigade, 25th Infantry Division, Wheeler Field, Hawaii
- 52nd Aviation Regiment
  - 1st Battalion, 16th Combat Aviation Brigade, Fort Wainwright, Alaska
  - 2nd Battalion, Combat Aviation Brigade, 2d Infantry Division, Camp Humphreys, South Korea
  - 6th Battalion, 11th Aviation Command, Los Alamitos, California
  - Company G, 12th Combat Aviation Brigade, U.S. Army Europe, Germany
- 58th Aviation Regiment
  - 1st Battalion, Fort Novosel, Alabama
- 82nd Aviation Regiment
  - 1st Battalion, Combat Aviation Brigade, 82nd Airborne Division, Fort Bragg, North Carolina
  - 2nd Battalion, Combat Aviation Brigade, 82nd Airborne Division, Fort Bragg, North Carolina
  - 3rd Battalion, Combat Aviation Brigade, 82nd Airborne Division, Fort Bragg, North Carolina
- 101st Aviation Regiment
  - 1st Battalion, 101st Combat Aviation Brigade, 101st Airborne Division (Air Assault), Fort Campbell, Kentucky
  - 5th Battalion, 101st Combat Aviation Brigade, 101st Airborne Division (Air Assault), Fort Campbell, Kentucky
  - 6th Battalion, 101st Combat Aviation Brigade, 101st Airborne Division (Air Assault), Fort Campbell, Kentucky
- 145th Aviation Regiment (Training)
  - 1st Battalion, 1st Aviation Brigade, Fort Novosel, Alabama
- 158th Aviation Regiment
  - 1st Battalion, 11th Aviation Command, Conroe, Texas
  - 7th Battalion, 244th Aviation Brigade, Fort Hood, Texas (USAR)
  - Company I, Fort Hood, Texas
- 159th Aviation Regiment
  - 5th Battalion, 244th Aviation Brigade, Fort Eustis, Virginia
- 160th Aviation Regiment (Special Operations) (160th SOAR)
  - 1st Battalion, Fort Campbell, Kentucky
  - 2nd Battalion, Fort Campbell, Kentucky
  - 3rd Battalion, Hunter Army Airfield, Georgia
  - 4th Battalion, Fort Lewis, Washington
- 210th Aviation Regiment (Training)
  - 1st Battalion, 128th Aviation Brigade, Joint Base Eustis-Langley, Virginia
  - 2nd Battalion, 128th Aviation Brigade, Joint Base Eustis-Langley, Virginia
- 212th Aviation Regiment (Training)
  - 1st Battalion, 110th Aviation Brigade, Fort Novosel, Alabama
- 214th Aviation Regiment
  - 1st Battalion, 12th Combat Aviation Brigade, Katterbach Army Airfield, Germany
- 222nd Aviation Regiment (Training)
  - 1st Battalion, 128th Aviation Brigade, Joint Base Eustis-Langley, Virginia
- 223rd Aviation Regiment (Training)
  - 1st Battalion, 110th Aviation Brigade, Fort Novosel, Alabama
- 227th Aviation Regiment
  - 1st Battalion, Combat Aviation Brigade, 1st Cavalry Division, Fort Hood, Texas
  - 2nd Battalion, Combat Aviation Brigade, 1st Cavalry Division, Fort Hood, Texas
  - 3rd Battalion, Combat Aviation Brigade, 1st Cavalry Division, Fort Hood, Texas
  - 4th Battalion, Combat Aviation Brigade, 1st Cavalry Division, Fort Hood, Texas
- 228th Aviation Regiment
  - 1st Battalion, Joint Task Force Bravo, Soto Cano Air Base, Honduras
  - 2nd Battalion, 244th Aviation Brigade, Horsham, Pennsylvania (USAR)
- 229th Aviation Regiment
  - 1st Battalion, 16th Combat Aviation Brigade (United States), Fort Lewis, Washington
  - 8th Battalion, 11th Theater Aviation Command (United States), Fort Knox, Kentucky
- 501st Aviation Regiment
  - 1st Battalion, Combat Aviation Brigade, 1st Armored Division (United States), Ft. Bliss, Texas
  - 2nd Battalion, Combat Aviation Brigade, 1st Armored Division (United States), Ft. Bliss, Texas
  - 3rd Battalion, Combat Aviation Brigade, 1st Armored Division (United States), Ft. Bliss, Texas

=== Cyber regiment ===
Though a combat arms branch, the Cyber branch was not established until 2014 and does not trace lineage to any Army regiments under the Combat Arms Regimental System (CARS). The Cyber regimental plan is identical to that of combat support (CS), combat service support (CSS), and special branches.

- Cyber Corps

=== Infantry regiments ===
==== Light, Stryker and mechanized infantry ====
- 1st Infantry Regiment
  - 1st Battalion (Garrison), United States Military Academy, West Point, New York
  - 2nd Battalion (Stryker), 2nd BCT, 2nd Infantry Division, Fort Lewis, Washington
- 2nd Infantry Regiment
  - 2nd Battalion (Light), 3rd BCT, 10th Mountain Division, Fort Polk, Louisiana
- 3rd Infantry Regiment
  - 1st Battalion (Ceremonial), Military District of Washington, Fort Myer, Virginia
  - 2nd Battalion (Stryker), 3rd BCT, 2nd Infantry Division, Fort Lewis, Washington
  - 4th Battalion (Ceremonial), Military District of Washington, Fort Myer, Virginia
- 4th Infantry Regiment
  - 1st Battalion (OPFOR), Joint Multinational Training Center, Seventh U.S. Army, Hohenfels, Germany
  - 2nd Battalion (Light), 3rd BCT, 10th Mountain Division (Light Infantry), Fort Polk, Louisiana
- 5th Infantry Regiment
  - 1st Battalion (Stryker), 1st BCT, 25th Infantry Division, Fort Wainwright, Alaska
  - 2nd Battalion (Combined Arms), 3rd BCT Brigade, 1st Armored Division, Fort Bliss, Texas
- 6th Infantry Regiment
  - 1st Battalion (Combined Arms), 2nd BCT, 1st Armored Division, Fort Bliss, Texas
- 7th Infantry Regiment
  - 2nd Battalion (Combined Arms), 1st BCT, 3rd Infantry Division, Fort Stewart, Georgia
- 8th Infantry Regiment
  - 1st Battalion (Combined Arms), 3rd BCT, 4th Infantry Division, Fort Carson, Colorado
- 9th Infantry Regiment
  - 4th Battalion (Stryker), 1st BCT, 4th Infantry Division, Fort Carson, Colorado
- 10th Infantry Regiment (Training Regiment)
  - 2nd Battalion, 3rd Chemical Brigade, Fort Leonard Wood, Missouri
  - 3rd Battalion, 3rd Chemical Brigade, Fort Leonard Wood, Missouri
  - 4th Battalion, 171st Infantry Brigade, Fort Jackson, South Carolina
- 11th Infantry Regiment (Training Regiment)
  - 2nd Battalion, 199th Infantry Brigade, Fort Benning, Georgia
  - 3rd Battalion, 199th Infantry Brigade, Fort Benning, Georgia
- 12th Infantry Regiment
  - 1st Battalion (Light), 2nd BCT, 4th Infantry Division, Fort Carson, Colorado
  - 2nd Battalion (Light), 2nd BCT, 4th Infantry Division, Fort Carson, Colorado
- 13th Infantry Regiment (Training Regiment)
  - 1st Battalion, 193rd Infantry Brigade, Fort Jackson, South Carolina
  - 2nd Battalion, 193rd Infantry Brigade, Fort Jackson, South Carolina
  - 3rd Battalion, 193rd Infantry Brigade, Fort Jackson, South Carolina
- 14th Infantry Regiment
  - 2nd Battalion (Light), 2nd BCT, 10th Mountain Division (Light Infantry), Fort Drum, New York
- 15th Infantry Regiment
  - 3rd Battalion (Combined Arms), 2nd BCT, 3rd Infantry Division, Fort Stewart, Georgia
- 16th Infantry Regiment
  - 1st Battalion (Combined Arms), 1st BCT, 1st Infantry Division, Fort Riley, Kansas
- 17th Infantry Regiment
  - 1st Battalion (Stryker), 2nd BCT, 2nd Infantry Division, Fort Lewis, Washington
  - 4th Battalion (Stryker), 1st BCT, 1st Armored Division, Fort Bliss, Texas
- 18th Infantry Regiment
  - 1st Battalion (Combined Arms), 2nd BCT, 1st Infantry Division, Fort Riley, Kansas
- 19th Infantry Regiment (Training Regiment)
  - 1st Battalion, 198th Infantry Brigade, Fort Benning, Georgia
  - 2nd Battalion, 198th Infantry Brigade, Fort Benning, Georgia
- 20th Infantry Regiment
  - 5th Battalion (Stryker), 1st BCT, 2nd Infantry Division, Fort Lewis, Washington
- 21st Infantry Regiment
  - 1st Battalion (Light), 2nd BCT, 25th Infantry Division, Schofield Barracks, Hawaii
  - 3rd Battalion (Stryker), 1st BCT, 25th Infantry Division, Fort Wainwright, Alaska
- 22nd Infantry Regiment
  - 2nd Battalion (Light), 1st BCT, 10th Mountain Division, Fort Drum, New York
- 23rd Infantry Regiment
  - 1st Battalion, 3rd BCT, 2nd Infantry Division, Fort Lewis, Washington
  - 2nd Battalion, 1st BCT, 4th Infantry Division, Fort Carson, Colorado
  - 4th Battalion, 2nd BCT, 2nd Infantry Division, Fort Lewis, Washington
- 24th Infantry Regiment
  - 1st Battalion, 1st BCT, 25th Infantry Division, Fort Wainwright, Alaska
- 27th Infantry Regiment
  - 1st Battalion, 2nd BCT, 25th Infantry Division, Schofield Barracks, Hawaii
  - 2nd Battalion, 3rd BCT, 25th Infantry Division, Schofield Barracks, Hawaii
- 28th Infantry Regiment
  - 1st Battalion, Task Force, 3rd Infantry Division, Fort Stewart, Georgia
- 29th Infantry Regiment (Training Regiment)
  - 1st Battalion, 199th Infantry Brigade, Fort Benning, Georgia
- 30th Infantry Regiment
  - 2nd Battalion, 3rd BCT, 10th Mountain Division (Light Infantry), Fort Polk, Louisiana
- 31st Infantry Regiment
  - 4th Battalion, 2nd BCT, 10th Mountain Division (Light Infantry), Fort Drum, New York
- 32nd Infantry Regiment
  - 1st Battalion, 1st BCT, 10th Mountain Division (Light Infantry), Fort Drum, New York
- 34th Infantry Regiment(Training Regiment)
  - 1st Battalion, 165th Infantry Brigade, Fort Jackson, South Carolina
  - 3rd Battalion, 165th Infantry Brigade, Fort Jackson, South Carolina
- 35th Infantry Regiment
  - 2nd Battalion, 3rd BCT, 25th Infantry Division, Schofield Barracks, Hawaii
- 36th Infantry Regiment
  - 1st Battalion, 1st BCT, 1st Armored Division, Fort Bliss, Texas
- 38th Infantry Regiment
  - 1st Battalion, 1st BCT, 4th Infantry Division, Fort Carson, Colorado
- 39th Infantry Regiment (United States) (Training Regiment)
  - 2nd Battalion, 165th Infantry Brigade, Fort Jackson, South Carolina
- 41st Infantry Regiment
  - 1st Battalion, 3rd BCT, 1st Armored Division, Fort Bliss, Texas
  - 3rd Battalion, 1st BCT, 1st Armored Division, Fort Bliss, Texas
- 46th Infantry Regiment
  - 1st Battalion, 198th Infantry Brigade, Fort Benning, Georgia
- 47th Infantry Regiment (Training Regiment)
  - 2nd Battalion, 198th Infantry Brigade, Fort Benning, Georgia
- 48th Infantry Regiment (Training Regiment)
  - 1st Battalion, 3rd Chemical Brigade, Fort Leonard Wood, Missouri
  - 2nd Battalion, 3rd Chemical Brigade, Fort Leonard Wood, Missouri
- 50th Infantry Regiment (Training Regiment)
  - 1st Battalion, 198th Infantry Brigade, Fort Benning, Georgia
- 51st Infantry Regiment
- 52nd Infantry Regiment
- 54th Infantry Regiment (Training Regiment)
  - 2nd Battalion, 198th Infantry Brigade, Fort Benning, Georgia
- 58th Infantry Regiment (Training Regiment)
  - 2nd Battalion, 198th Infantry Brigade, Fort Benning, Georgia
- 60th Infantry Regiment (Training Regiment)
  - 2nd Battalion, 193rd Infantry Brigade, Fort Jackson, South Carolina
  - 3rd Battalion, 193rd Infantry Brigade, Fort Jackson, South Carolina
- 61st Infantry Regiment (Training Regiment)
  - 1st Battalion, 165th Infantry Brigade, Fort Jackson, South Carolina
- 87th Infantry Regiment
  - 1st Battalion, 1st BCT, 10th Mountain Division (Light Infantry), Fort Drum, New York
  - 2nd Battalion, 2nd BCT, 10th Mountain Division (Light Infantry), Fort Drum, New York
- 133rd Infantry Regiment
  - 1st Battalion, 2nd BCT, 34th Infantry Division, Waterloo, Iowa

==== Airborne and air assault infantry regiments ====
- 26th Infantry Regiment (Air Assault)
  - 1st Battalion, 2nd BCT, 101st Airborne Division (Air Assault), Fort Campbell, Kentucky
- 187th Infantry Regiment (Air Assault)
  - 1st Battalion, 3rd BCT, 101st Airborne Division (Air Assault), Fort Campbell, Kentucky
  - 3rd Battalion, 3rd BCT, 101st Airborne Division (Air Assault), Fort Campbell, Kentucky
- 188th Infantry Regiment (Airborne)(Inactive)
- 325th Infantry Regiment (Airborne)
  - 1st Battalion, 2nd BCT, 82nd Airborne Division, Fort Bragg, North Carolina
  - 2nd Battalion, 2nd BCT, 82nd Airborne Division, Fort Bragg, North Carolina
- 327th Infantry Regiment (Air Assault)
  - 1st Battalion, 1st BCT, 101st Airborne Division (Air Assault), Fort Campbell, Kentucky
  - 2nd Battalion, 1st BCT, 101st Airborne Division (Air Assault), Fort Campbell, Kentucky
- 501st Infantry Regiment (Airborne)
  - 1st Battalion, 4th BCT, 25th Infantry Division, Fort Richardson, Alaska
  - 2nd Battalion, 1st BCT, 82nd Airborne Division, Fort Bragg, North Carolina
- 502nd Infantry Regiment (Air Assault)
  - 1st Battalion, 2nd BCT, 101st Airborne Division (Air Assault), Fort Campbell, Kentucky
  - 2nd Battalion, 2nd BCT, 101st Airborne Division (Air Assault), Fort Campbell, Kentucky
- 503rd Infantry Regiment (Airborne)
  - 1st Battalion, 173rd ABCT, Vicenza, Italy
  - 2nd Battalion, 173rd ABCT, Vicenza, Italy
- 504th Infantry Regiment (Airborne)
  - 1st Battalion, 1st BCT, 82nd Airborne Division, Fort Bragg, North Carolina
  - 2nd Battalion, 1st BCT, 82nd Airborne Division, Fort Bragg, North Carolina
- 505th Infantry Regiment (Airborne)
  - 1st Battalion, 3rd BCT, 82nd Airborne Division, Fort Bragg, North Carolina
  - 2nd Battalion, 3rd BCT, 82nd Airborne Division, Fort Bragg, North Carolina
- 506th Infantry Regiment (Air Assault)
  - 1st Battalion, 1st BCT, 101st Airborne Division (Air Assault), Fort Campbell, Kentucky
  - 2nd Battalion, 3rd BCT, 101st Airborne Division (Air Assault), Fort Campbell, Kentucky
- 507th Infantry Regiment (Airborne)(Training Regiment)
  - 1st Battalion, Airborne and Ranger Training Brigade, Fort Benning, Georgia
- 508th Infantry Regiment (Airborne)
  - 1st Battalion, 3rd BCT, 82nd Airborne Division, Fort Bragg, North Carolina
  - 2nd Battalion, 2nd BCT, 82nd Airborne Division, Fort Bragg, North Carolina
- 509th Infantry Regiment (Airborne)
  - 1st Battalion, JRTC, Fort Johnson, Louisiana (Operates as an Opposing Force for training)
  - 3rd Battalion, 4th BCT, 25th Infantry Division, Fort Richardson, Alaska
- 511th Infantry Regiment (Airborne)(Inactive)

==== Ranger infantry ====
- 75th Ranger Regiment
  - 1st Battalion, Hunter Army Airfield, Georgia
  - 2nd Battalion, Fort Lewis, Washington
  - 3rd Battalion, Fort Benning, Georgia
  - Special Troops Battalion, Fort Benning, Georgia

==== Special forces ====
1st Special Forces Command (Airborne)

- 1st Special Forces Group (Airborne)
  - 1st Battalion, Okinawa, Japan
  - 2nd Battalion, Fort Lewis, Washington
  - 3rd Battalion, Fort Lewis, Washington
  - 4th Battalion, Fort Lewis, Washington
  - Support Battalion, Fort Lewis, Washington
- 3rd Special Forces Group (Airborne)
  - 1st Battalion, Fort Bragg, North Carolina
  - 2nd Battalion, Fort Bragg, North Carolina
  - 3rd Battalion, Fort Bragg, North Carolina
  - 4th Battalion, Fort Bragg, North Carolina
  - Support Battalion, Fort Bragg, North Carolina
- 5th Special Forces Group (Airborne)
  - 1st Battalion, Fort Campbell, Kentucky
  - 2nd Battalion, Fort Campbell, Kentucky
  - 3rd Battalion, Fort Campbell, Kentucky
  - 4th Battalion, Fort Campbell, Kentucky
  - Support Battalion, Fort Campbell, Kentucky
- 7th Special Forces Group (Airborne)
  - 1st Battalion, Eglin AFB, Florida
  - 2nd Battalion, Eglin AFB, Florida
  - 3rd Battalion, Eglin AFB, Florida
  - 4th Battalion, Eglin AFB, Florida
  - Support Battalion, Eglin AFB, Florida
- 10th Special Forces Group (Airborne)
  - 1st Battalion, Stuttgart, Germany
  - 2nd Battalion, Fort Carson, Colorado
  - 3rd Battalion, Fort Carson, Colorado
  - 4th Battalion, Fort Carson, Colorado
  - Support Battalion, Fort Carson, Colorado
- 19th Special Forces Group (Airborne) (Army National Guard)
  - 1st Battalion (WAARNG, UTARNG)
  - 2nd Battalion (OHARNG, RIARNG, WVARNG)
  - 5th Battalion (COARNG)
- 20th Special Forces Group (Airborne) (Army National Guard)
  - 1st Battalion (ALARNG, MAARNG)
  - 2nd Battalion (ILARNG, MDARNG, MSARNG)
  - 3rd Battalion (FLARNG, NCARNG)

== Combat support (CS), combat service support (CSS), and special branches ==
=== Concept ===
The CS, CSS, and special branch regimental plans fully integrate into the USARS under the "whole branch" concept. It is the responsibility of all proponents to incorporate within their corps, the intent and spirit of the regimental system to provide soldiers the opportunity for affiliation.

While this initiative mandates a uniform approach to regimental affiliation throughout the Army, it is a system that has no tradition within the Army and duplicates the sense of affiliation that CS, CSS, and special branch soldiers already had for their branch (Ordnance, Signal Corps, etc.)

=== Branches ===
==== Combat support ====
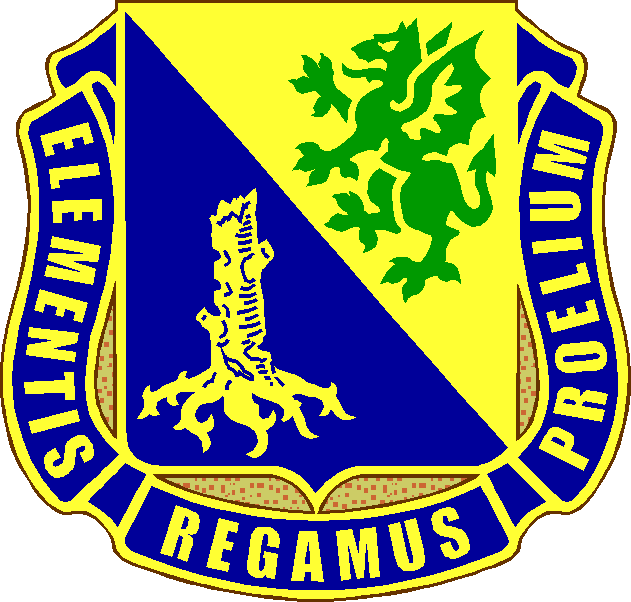
Chemical Corps

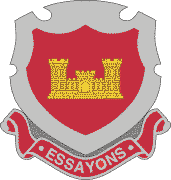
Corps of Engineers

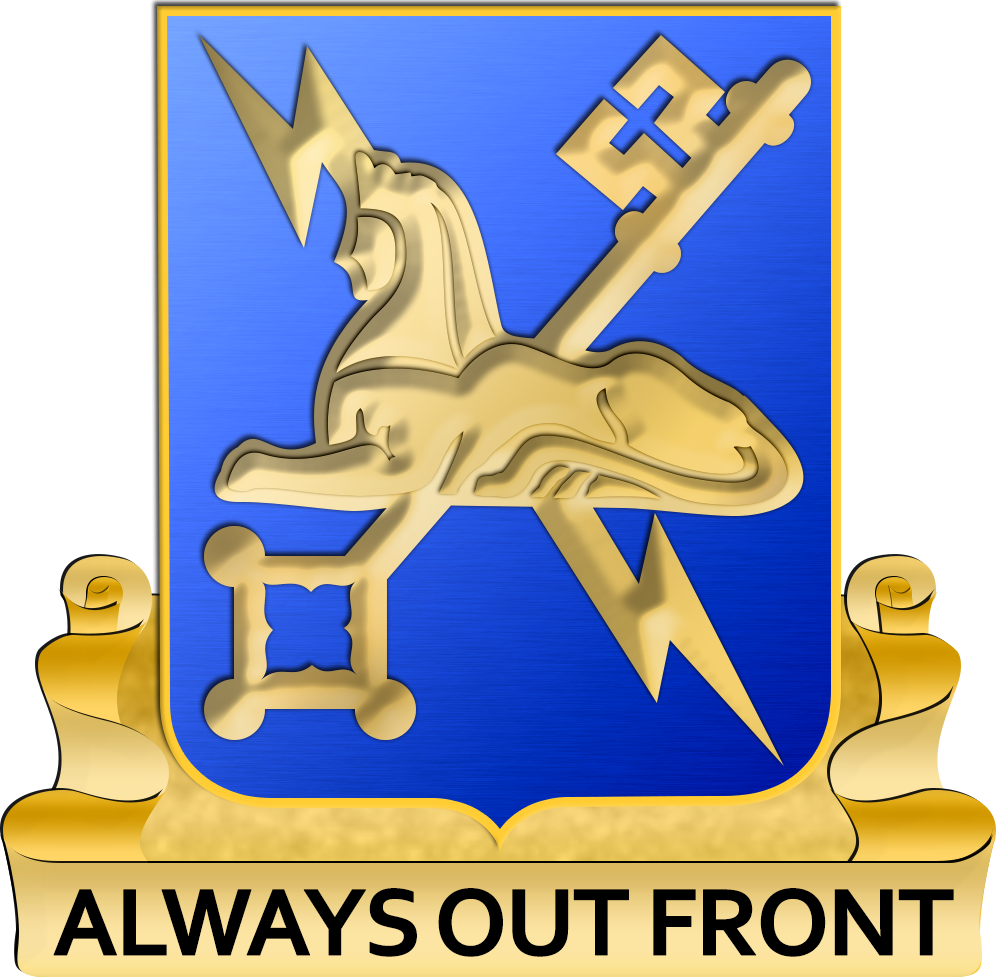
Military Intelligence Corps

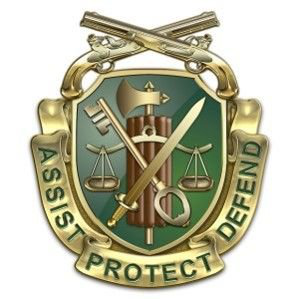
Military Police Corps

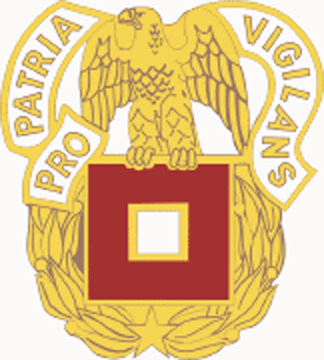
Signal Corps

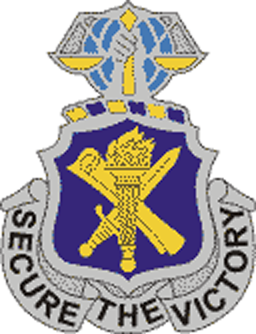
Civil Affairs Corps

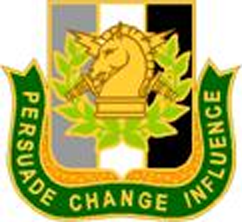
Psychological Operations (2007)

==== Combat service support ====
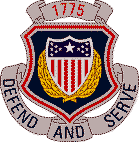
Adjutant General's Corps

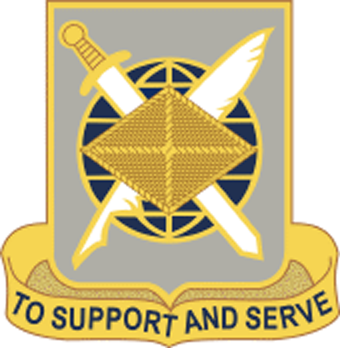
Finance Corps

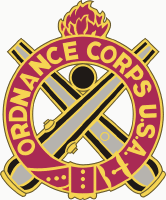
Ordnance Corps

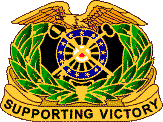
Quartermaster Corps

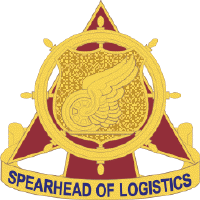
Transportation Corps

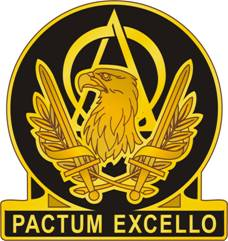
Acquisition Corps (2008)

==== Special ====
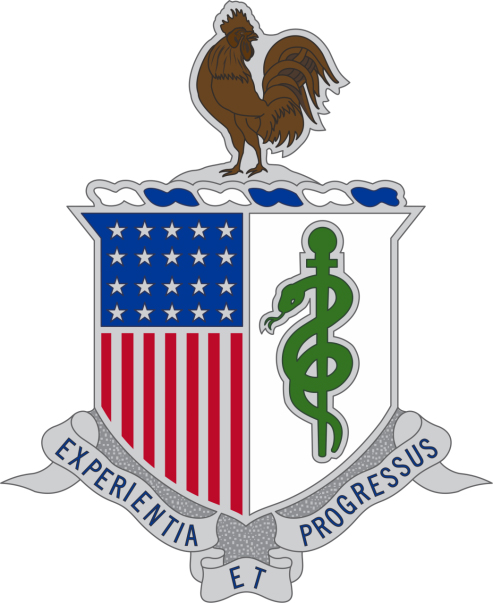
Army Medical Department

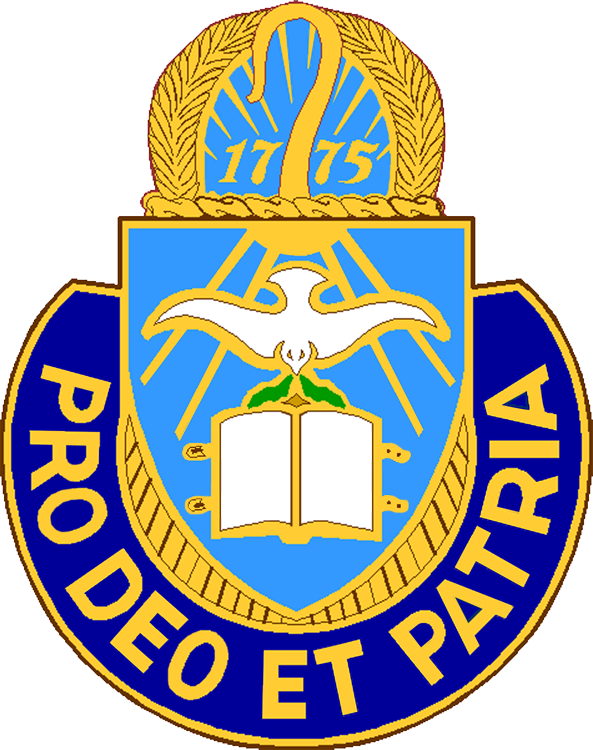
Chaplain Corps

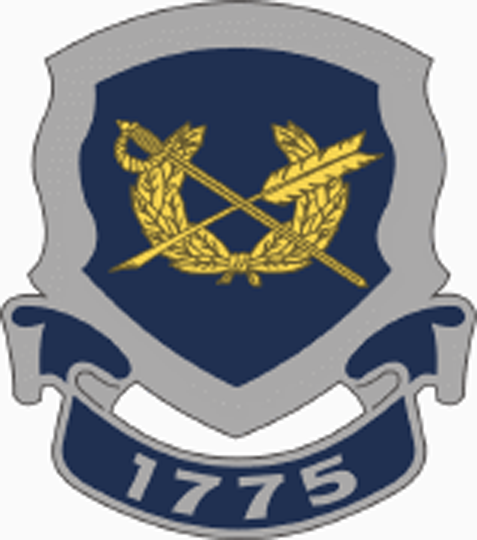
Judge Advocate General's Corps
