= Cyber Corps (United States Army) =

U.S. Army's branch for conducting cyberspace operations

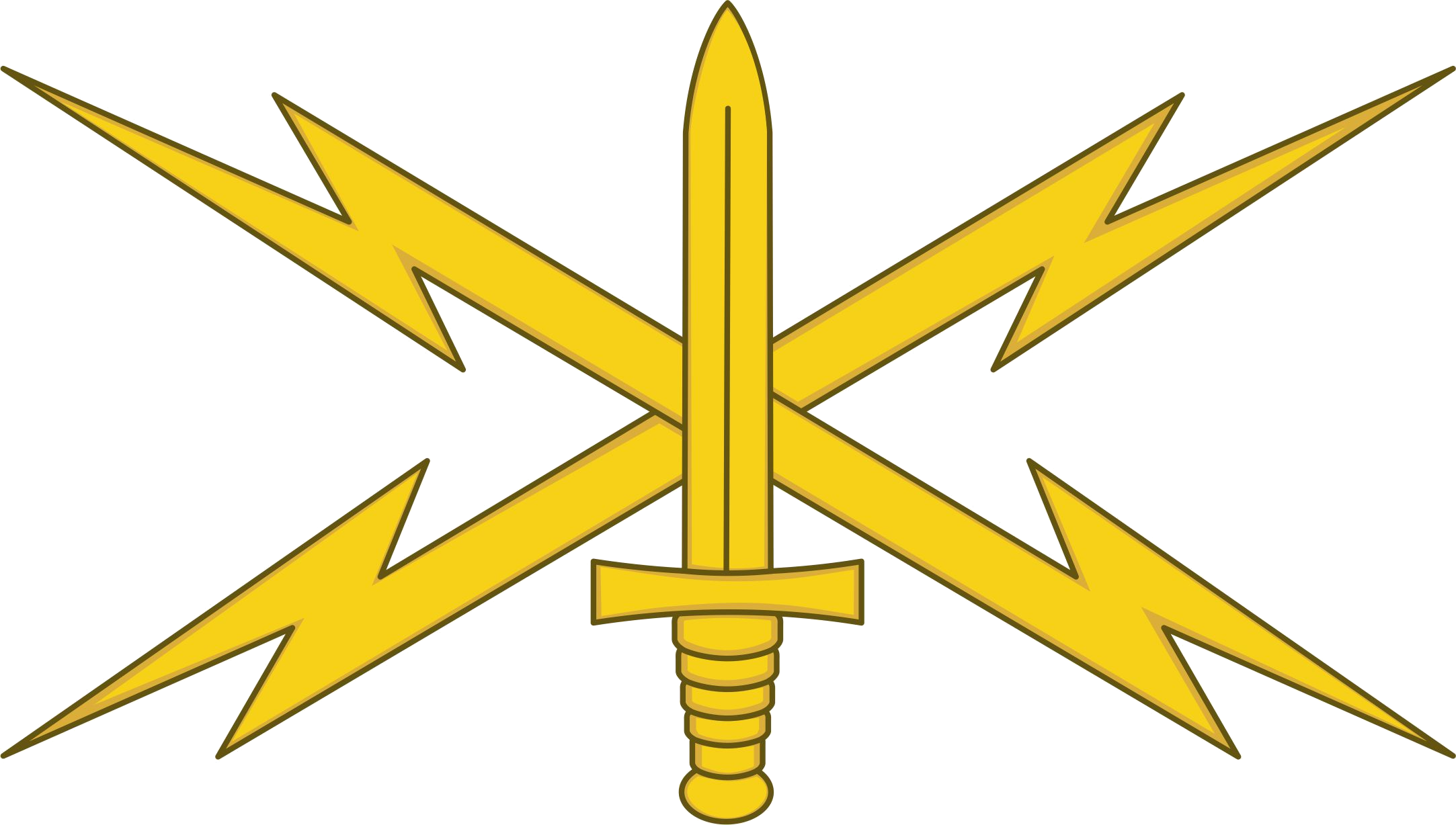
- Cyber branch insignia, featuring crossed lightning bolts
- Active: 1 September 2014 – Present
- Country: United States
- Branch: United States Army
- Type: Cyber
- Role: Cyber Warfare
- Home station: Fort Gordon, Georgia
- Mottos: Defend, Attack, Exploit
- Colors: Steel Gray and Black

Insignia
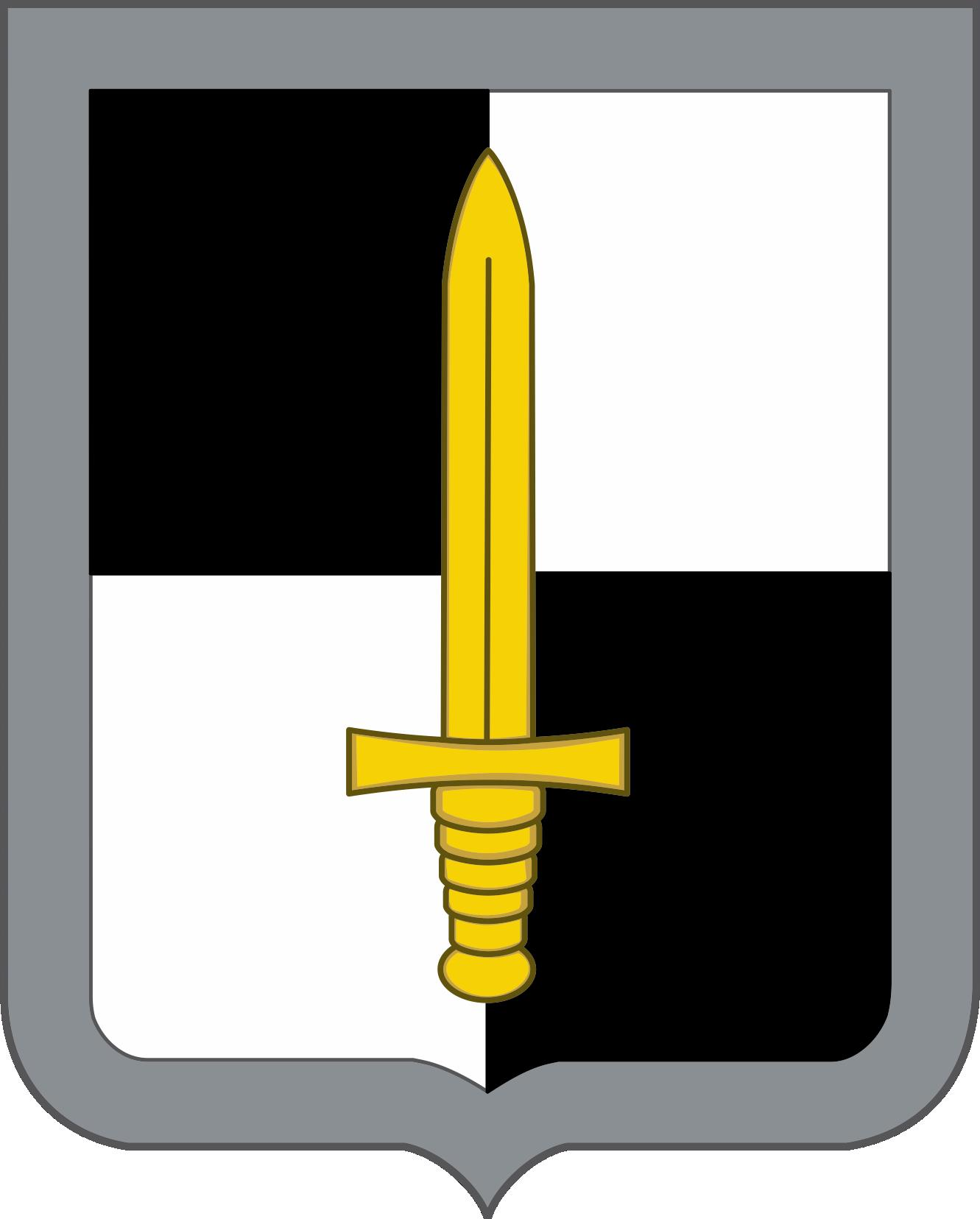
- Coat of arms

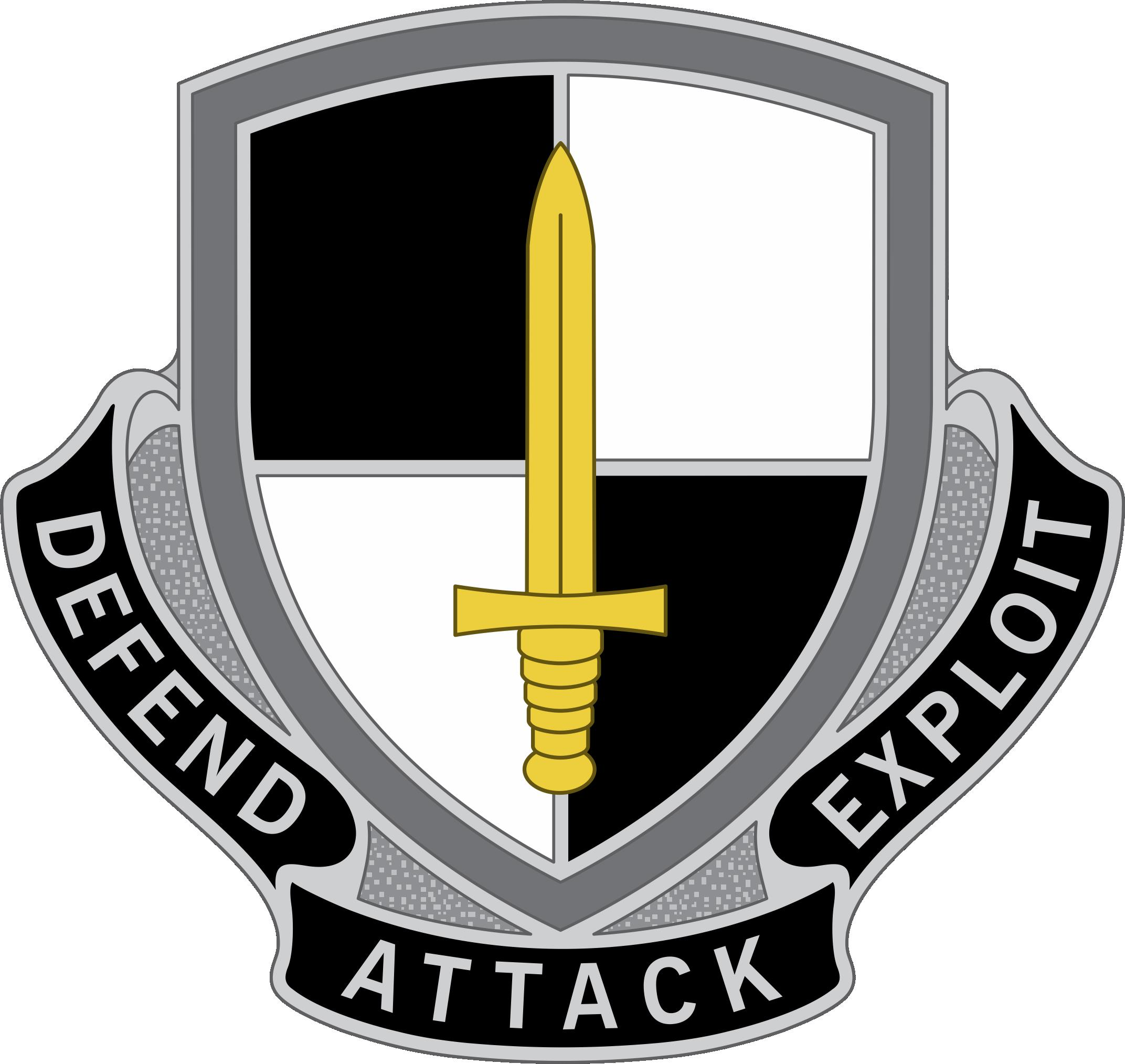
- Regimental insignia

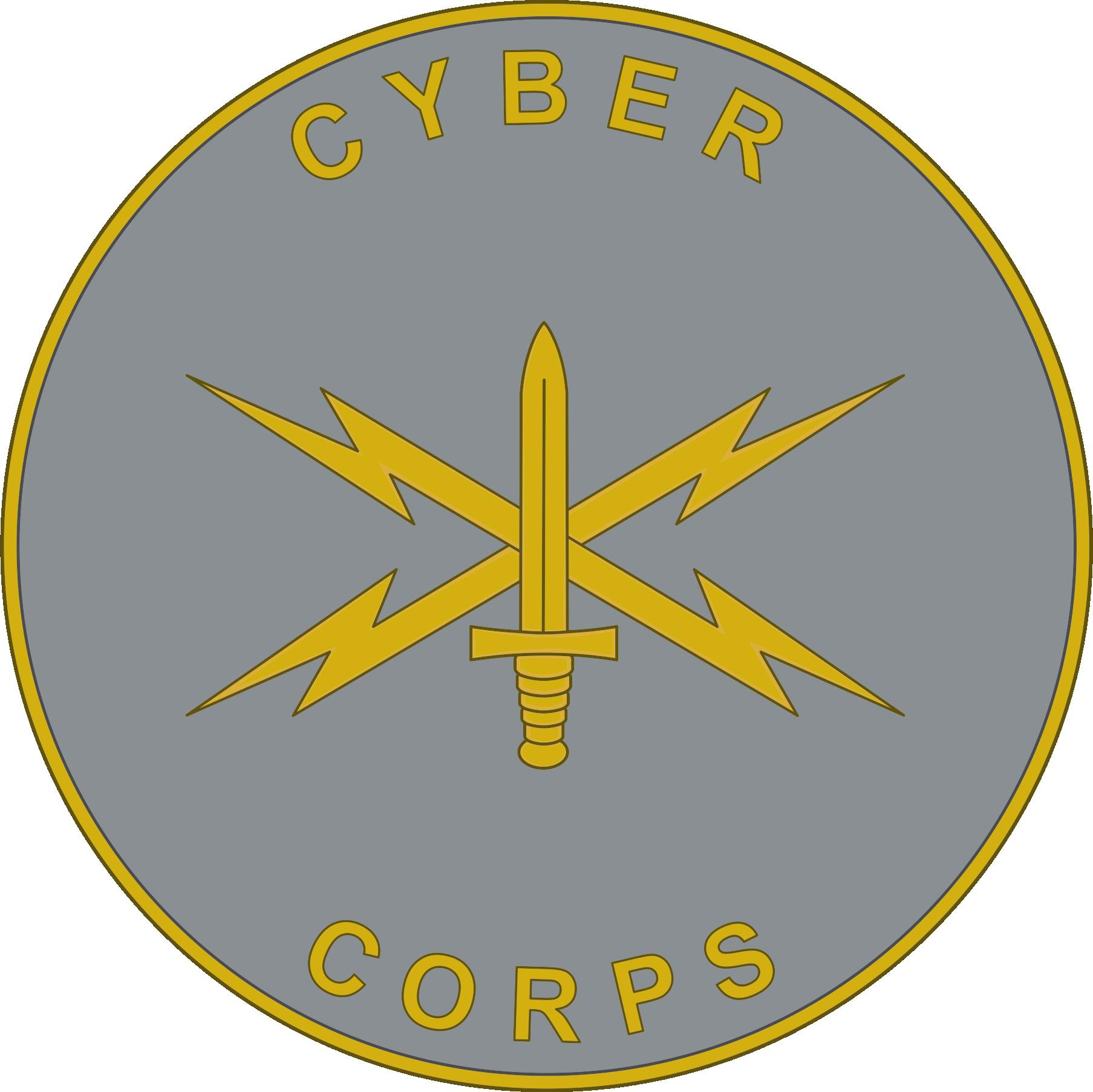
- Branch plaque

The Cyber Corps is the cyber and information warfare branch of the United States Army. Created on 1 September 2014 by the order of John M. McHugh, the then-secretary of the army, it is the newest branch of the US Army. The US Army describes it as "a maneuver branch with the mission to conduct defensive and offensive cyberspace operations (DCO and OCO). Cyber is the only branch designed to directly engage threats within the cyberspace domain."

Prior to the establishment of the Cyber Corps, cyber and information warfare military occupational specialities (MOSs) were managed by several other Army branches and functional areas, primarily the Military Intelligence Corps and Signal Corps. The Cyber Corps is responsible for the training, management, development, and organization of the ten enlisted, warrant officer, and commissioned officer MOSs assigned to the branch.

== Military occupational specialties ==
The following MOSs are managed by the Cyber Corps branch:

Officer

- 17A: Cyber Warfare Officer
- 17B: Cyber Electromagnetic Activities Officer – Electronic Warfare
- 17D: Cyber Capabilities Development Officer
- 17X: Cyber Officer Designated

Warrant

- 170A: Cyber Operations Technician
- 170B: Cyber Electromagnetic Activities Technician – Electronic Warfare
- 170D: Cyber Capabilities Developer Technician

Enlisted

- 17C: Cyber Operations Specialist
- 17E: Electronic Warfare Specialist
- 17Z: Cyberspace and Electromagnetic Activities (CEMA) Senior Sergeant
