= 4th Battalion, 319th Field Artillery Regiment =

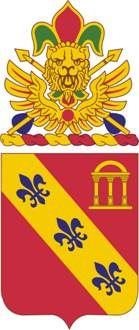
- 319th Field Artillery Regiment Coat of arms
- Active: 1917–present
- Country: United States
- Branch: Army
- Type: Airborne Field Artillery
- Garrison/HQ: Grafenwoehr
- Nickname: King of the Herd
- Equipment: M119A3 howitzer, M777A2 howitzer

Commanders
- Battalion Commander: LTC Pete Harrington
- Command Sergeant Major: CSM Bryan H. Valentine

Insignia
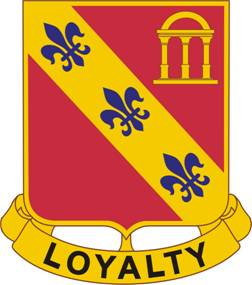
- Distinctive unit insignia

- Beret flash

The 4th Battalion, 319th Field Artillery Regiment (4-319th FAR) is the field artillery battalion assigned to the 173rd Airborne Brigade. Nicknamed "The King of the Herd", 4–319th AFAR has participated in battles from World War I to current operations around the globe. The battalion's mission is to provide direct supporting fires to the brigade. The unit is skilled in both the art of integrating and synchronizing all available fire support assets and in the science of delivering accurate and timely lethal and non-lethal fires. "King of the Herd" Paratroopers in the 173rd Infantry Brigade Combat Team (Airborne) are able to accomplish both of these tasks and other assigned missions after rapidly deploying via parachute assault.

== History ==
The 4th Battalion, 319th Field Artillery Regiment (4-319th FAR), "King of the Herd," was activated on 8 June 2006 from elements of Battery D, 319th Field Artillery and 1st Battalion, 33rd Field Artillery at Warner Barracks in Bamberg, Germany and assigned to the 173rd Airborne Brigade Combat Team.

Under the U.S. Army Regimental System, the battalion traces its lineage to Battery D, 319th Field Artillery Regiment, which was originally constituted 5 August 1917 and assigned to the 82nd Division. It was organized and activated 9 September 1917 at Camp Gordon, Georgia and arrived in France in late 1917. The 319th Field Artillery participated in three major campaigns during World War I. At the conclusion of the war, the 82nd Division returned home and was demobilized on 18 May 1919.

The battalion was reorganized and redesignated the 319th Field Artillery Battalion (FAB) in 1942 and was ordered into active federal service on 25 March 1942. As part of this reorganization, Battery D was absorbed into Battery A. On 15 August 1942, the 319th FAB was reorganized and redesignated as the 319th Glider Field Artillery Battalion (GFAB). The 319th GFAB participated in all six World War II campaigns of the 82nd Airborne Division, including assault landings in Normandy and the Netherlands. The 319th GFAB was awarded two Presidential Unit Citations and two French Croix de Guerre with palm.

From 1957 until 1964, the reconstituted Battery D, 319th served in the pentomic 101st Airborne Division at Fort Campbell, Kentucky. Battery D was inactive from 1964 until 1988, when it was activated in Italy. Then known as "Delta Battery," it provided direct support to the 3rd Airborne Battalion Combat Team, 325th Airborne Infantry Regiment; to the 1st Airborne Battalion Combat Team, 508th Parachute Infantry Regiment; and finally to the 173rd Airborne Brigade.

=== Operation Provide Comfort ===
Following the March 1991 cease fire, Battery D, 319th Field Artillery deployed with the 3rd Airborne Battalion Combat Team, 325th Airborne Infantry Regiment to Turkey and northern Iraq for Operation Provide Comfort.

=== Operation Iraqi Freedom I ===
On 26 March 2003, D/319, as part of 173rd Airborne Brigade, conducted a parachute assault on Bashur Drop Zone in northern Iraq. The battery operated in northern Iraq from March 2003 until February 2004, before re-deploying to Italy.

=== Operation Enduring Freedom VI ===
From February 2005 to February 2006, D/319 FAR deployed to OEF VI, providing fire support to forces throughout Regional Command East.

In June 2006, Battery D, 319th FAR was reorganized and redesignated as Headquarters and Headquarters Battery (HHB), 4-319 FAR, with two organic firing batteries (Battery A, 4-319 FAR, Battery B, and G Battery 4-319 FAR ) concurrently constituted and activated following the transformation of the 173rd Airborne Brigade into a Brigade Combat Team.

=== Operation Enduring Freedom VIII ===
Less than a year after its formation as a battalion, 4-319 deployed to Afghanistan again, earning the Meritorious Unit Commendation for service from May 2007 to July 2008, while providing in excess of 26,000 rounds in support of combat operations in Nangahar, Nuristan, Kunar, and Laghman (N2KL) provinces in Regional Command East. 4-319 AFAR was led on this, their first deployment after activation as the 173rd Airborne Brigade's Field Artillery battalion, by LTC Stephen J. Maranian and CSM Mark Brandenburg.

=== Operation Enduring Freedom X ===
From November 2009 until November 2010, 4-319 returned to Regional Command East with the 173rd Airborne Brigade, again receiving the Meritorious Unit Commendation for combat operations in Wardak and Logar provinces. The battalion was led by then-LTC David Sink and had many victories.

=== Operation Enduring Freedom XIII ===
The 4-319 FAR also returned to Wardak and Logar for OEF XIII from 2012 to 2013.

During the fall of 2013, the battalion relocated from Warner Barracks in Bamberg, Germany, to Tower Barracks, Grafenwoehr Training Area.

== Commanders & Command Sergeants Major ==
LTC Paul R. Daniels

(16 September 2006 to 19 December 2006)

LTC Stephen J. Maranian

(19 December 2006 to 25 November 2008)

LTC David G. Sink

(25 November 2008 to 25 May 2011)

LTC Kelly L. Webster

(25 May 2011 to 20 June 2013)

LTC William L. Kirby

(20 June 2013 to 19 June 2015)

LTC David J. Pasquale

(19 June 2015 to 27 June 2017)

LTC James H.B. Peay IV

(27 June 2017 to 21 June 2019)

LTC Michael P. Tumlin

(21 June 2019 to 9 June 2021)

LTC Robert Kinney

(9 June 2021 to 25 May 2023)

LTC Peter Harrington

(11 June 2025 to Present)

CSM Lorenzo F. Wallace

(16 September 2006 to 15 November 2006)

CSM Mark V. Brandenburg

(19 December 2006 to 25 November 2008)

CSM Dennis J. Woods

(25 November 2008 to 25 May 2011)

CSM Franklin M. Jacobs

(25 May 2011 to 8 May 2013)

CSM Elroy Grant

(8 May 2013 to 18 June 2015)

CSM Robert Edwards Jr.

(18 June 2015 to 6 March 2017)

CSM Jean Pierre Alcedo

(6 March 2017 to 7 June 2019)

CSM Mark T. Smith

(23 July 2019 to 7 October 2021)

CSM Matthew J. Gallagher

(7 October 2021 to 13 September 2023)

CSM Bryan H. Valentine

(13 September 2023 to Present)

== Lineage and honors ==
=== Lineage ===
- Constituted 5 August 1917 in the National Army as Battery D, 319th Field Artillery, an element of the 82d Division
- Organized 2 September 1917 at Camp Gordon, Georgia
- Demobilized 18 May 1919 at Camp Dix, New Jersey
- Reconstituted 24 June 1921 in the Organized Reserves as Battery D, 319th Field Artillery, an element of the 82d Division (later redesignated as the 82d Airborne Division)
- Organized in January 1922 at Decatur, Georgia
- Absorbed 13 February 1942 by Battery A, 319th Field Artillery Battalion

(Battery A, 319th Field Artillery, reorganized and redesignated 13 February 1942 as Battery A, 319th Field Artillery Battalion; ordered into active military service 25 March 1942 and reorganized at Camp Claiborne, Louisiana; reorganized and redesignated 15 August 1942 as Battery A, 319th Glider Field Artillery Battalion; reorganized and redesignated 15 December 1947 as Battery A, 319th Field Artillery Battalion; [Organized Reserves redesignated 25 March 1948 as the Organized Reserve Corps]; withdrawn 15 November 1948 from the Organized Reserve Corps and allotted to the Regular Army; reorganized and redesignated 15 December 1948 as Battery A, 319th Airborne Field Artillery Battalion)

- Former Battery D, 319th Field Artillery, reconstituted 25 April 1957 in the Regular Army; concurrently, redesignated as Battery D, 319th Artillery, assigned to the 101st Airborne Division, and activated at Fort Campbell, Kentucky
- Inactivated 3 April 1964 at Fort Campbell, Kentucky, and relieved from assignment to the 101st Airborne Division
- Redesignated 1 September 1971 as Battery D, 319th Field Artillery
- Activated 16 October 1988 in Italy
- Assigned 16 October 2000 to the 173d Airborne Brigade (later redesignated as the 173d Airborne Brigade Combat Team)
- Redesignated 1 October 2005 as Battery D, 319th Field Artillery Regiment
- Reorganized and redesignated 16 September 2006 as Headquarters and Headquarters Battery, 4th Battalion, 319th Field Artillery Regiment (organic elements concurrently constituted and activated)

=== Campaign participation credits ===
- World War I: St. Mihiel; Meuse-Argonne; Lorraine 1918
- World War II: Sicily; Naples Foggia; Normandy (with arrowhead); Rhineland (with arrowhead); Ardennes Alsace; Central Europe
- War on Terrorism: Campaigns to be determined
  - Afghanistan: Consolidation I, Consolidation II, Consolidation III, Transition I
  - Iraq: Liberation of Iraq (with arrowhead); Transition of Iraq

Note: The published Army lineage shows War on Terrorism "Campaigns to be determined" as of 12 April 2007. Comparison of the battalion's deployment dates with the War on Terrorism campaigns estimates that the battalion will be credited with participation in the six campaigns listed.

=== Decorations ===
- Presidential Unit Citation (Army), for CHIUNZI PASS
- Presidential Unit Citation (Army), for STE. MERE EGLISE
- Meritorious Unit Commendation (Army), for IRAQ 2003
- Meritorious Unit Commendation (Army), for AFGHANISTAN 2007-2008
- Meritorious Unit Commendation (Army), for AFGHANISTAN 2009-2010
- Meritorious Unit Commendation (Army), for AFGHANISTAN 2012-2013
- French Croix de Guerre with Palm, World War II, for STE. MERE EGLISE
- French Croix de Guerre with Palm, World War II, for COTENTIN
- French Croix de Guerre, World War II, Fourragere
- Military Order of William (Degree of the Knight of the Fourth Class), for NIJMEGEN 1944
- Netherlands Orange Lanyard
- Belgian Fourragere 1940
  - Cited in the Order of the Day of the Belgian Army for action at St. Vith
  - Cited in the Order of the Day of the Belgian Army for action in the Ardennes
  - Cited in the Order of the Day of the Belgian Army for action in Belgium and Germany

Battery B additionally entitle to:

- Valorous Unit Award, for AFGHANISTAN 2008

Note: Separately cited decorations are not listed in the official lineage, updated 12 April 2007, posted by the Center for Military History.

== Heraldry ==
=== Distinctive unit insignia ===
319th Field Artillery Regiment Distinctive Unit Insignia

=== Coat of arms ===
319th Field Artillery Regiment Coat of Arms
