= 319th Field Artillery Regiment =

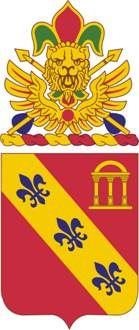
- Coat of arms of the 319th Glider Field Artillery Battalion (GFAB)
- Active: 1917–present
- Country: (United States)
- Branch: United States Army
- Type: Field artillery
- Role: USARS parent regiment
- Size: regiment

Insignia
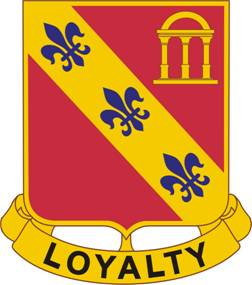
- Distinctive unit insignia

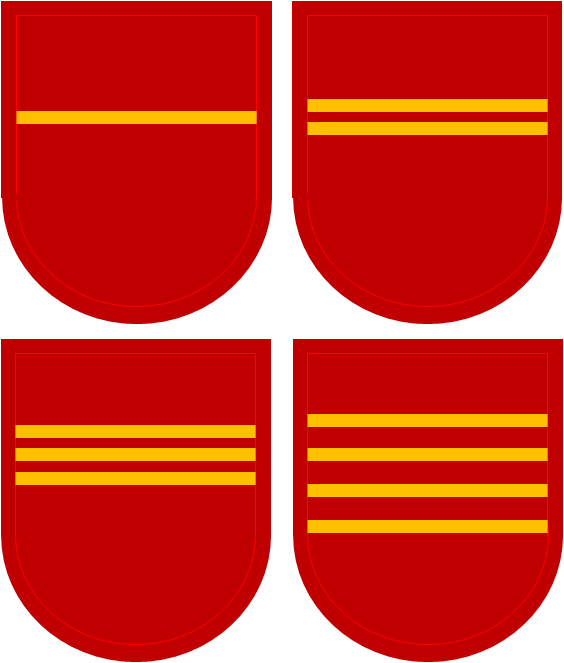
- Beret flashes of the Regiment's 1st, 2nd, 3rd, and 4th Battalions

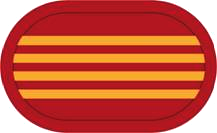
- Background trimming of the Regiment's 1st, 2nd, 3rd, and 4th Battalions

The 319th Field Artillery Regiment, more commonly referred to as the 319th Airborne Field Artillery Regiment (319th AFAR), is a parent regiment in the U.S. Army Regimental System. Four battalions of the regiment are currently active. The first three battalions 1st Battalion, 319th Field Artillery Regiment (1-319th AFAR), 2nd Battalion, 319th Field Artillery Regiment (2-319th AFAR), 3rd Battalion, 319th Field Artillery Regiment (3-319th AFAR) are in the 82nd Airborne Division and the 4th Battalion, 319th Field Artillery Regiment (4-319th AFAR) is in the 173rd Airborne Brigade.

== Current Status of Regimental Elements ==
- 1st Battalion, 319th Field Artillery Regiment (1-319th FAR): Active; assigned to the 3rd Brigade Combat Team, 82nd Airborne Division
- 2nd Battalion, 319th Field Artillery Regiment (2-319th FAR): Active; assigned to the 2nd Brigade Combat Team, 82nd Airborne Division
- 3rd Battalion, 319th Field Artillery Regiment (3-319th FAR): Active; assigned to the 1st Brigade Combat Team, 82nd Airborne Division
- 4th Battalion, 319th Field Artillery Regiment (4-319th FAR): Active; assigned to the 173rd Airborne Brigade Combat Team
- Battery E, 319th Field Artillery Regiment (E-319th FAR): Inactive since 3 April 1964

== History ==
=== World War I ===
The regiment was constituted on 5 August 1917 as a National Army unit, the 319th Field Artillery Regiment, and assigned to the 157th Field Artillery Brigade of the 82d Division. It was first physically formed ("organized") on 2 September 1917 at Camp Gordon, near Chamblee, Georgia. As the division's general support battalion, the 319th was organized with three battalions, each composed of two batteries- the six batteries were lettered consecutively through the regiment, so 1st Battalion was composed of Batteries A and B, 2nd Battalion of Batteries C and D, and 3rd Battalion of Batteries E and F. Although supposed to be equipped with 6-in howitzers, the 319th's six firing batteries shared two batteries worth of 3-in guns with the rest of the 157th Field Artillery Brigade, supplementing with replicas "crudely made structures fashioned from the trunks of small trees, tin cans, spools, gas pipes and any available material". During training, the regiment was designated and reorganized as a motorized regiment, but did not receive trucks until after the end of the fighting in 1918.

On 10 May 1918, the regiment departed Camp Gordon, taking trains to Camp Mills, NY, where it arrived on 12 May 1918. On 18 May 1918, the regiment boarded the British passenger liner Lapland. Sailing on 19 May 1918, the regiment arrived in Liverpool, England, on 31 May 1918, took trains to Winchester and spent two days in the Winnal Downs Rest Camp before crossing to France. The regiment arrived at La Courtine, France, on 7 June 1918. At La Courtine, the regiment was issued 155mm howitzers and conducted two months of training, building to a 157th Field Artillery Brigade live fire in early August.

On 15 August 1918, the 319th's 1st Battalion, under the command of Major Henry H. Denhardt, was attached to the 89th Division. On 20 August 1918, at 15:10, a gun from Battery A fired the 319th's first rounds at the front

It went overseas with the 82d Division and was present during the St. Mihiel offensive, the Meuse-Argonne, and the Lorraine advance of 1918. During the Meuse-Argonne Offensive, Major John Wallace, commanding 1st Battalion, 319th made the unit's first operational parachute jump when his observation balloon was shot down by a German plane.

=== Interwar period ===
The 319th Field Artillery arrived at the port of New York on 11 May 1919 on the troopship USS Alaskan and was demobilized on 18 May 1919 at Camp Dix, New Jersey. Pursuant to the National Defense Act of 1920, the regiment was reconstituted in the Organized Reserve on 24 June 1921, assigned to the 82nd Division, and allotted to the Fourth Corps Area. It was initiated on 14 December 1921 with the regimental headquarters at Decatur, Georgia. Subordinate battalion headquarters were concurrently organized as follows: 1st Battalion at Madison, Georgia, and 2nd Battalion at Savannah, Georgia. The regiment conducted summer training with the 2nd Battalion, 16th Field Artillery Regiment at Fort Bragg, North Carolina, and also conducted Citizens' Military Training Camps at Fort Bragg some years as an alternate form of training. The primary ROTC "feeder" school for new Reserve lieutenants for the regiment was the Georgia Institute of Technology in Atlanta, Georgia.

=== World War II ===
The regiment was reorganized and redesignated 13 February 1942 as the 319th Field Artillery Battalion. It was then ordered into active military service on 25 March 1942 and reorganized at Camp Claiborne, Louisiana. Reorganized and redesignated 15 August 1942 as the 319th Glider Field Artillery Battalion (GFAB). During World War II the battalion was present for the Invasion of Sicily (although it saw no combat after the friendly fire incident on 11 July involving the 1st and 2nd Battalions of the 504th PIR, Company C of the 307th Airborne Engineer Battalion, and the 376th PFAB), the Salerno landings, the Normandy landings, where it earned a Presidential Unit Citation at Ste Mere Eglise, the invasion of the Rhineland (for which two operations it was granted an arrowhead distinction), and fighting in the Ardennes-Alsace region. It was also given general campaign credit for Central Europe.

The 319th Glider Field Artillery Battalion saw its first combat action in Italy in September 1943 when it was chosen by Col. Darby of the U.S. Rangers to be his only artillery unit to support his Rangers in a seaborne invasion of the Naples coast. Fighting alongside the Rangers and small detached units from the 82nd Airborne, it effectively repelled numerous German counterattacks and kept the roads to Naples through the Chiunzi Pass clear until the US and British forces could gain control of the Sorrento Plateau.

The 319th gained distinction as the first Allied unit to enter Naples and formally liberate that city from the retreating German forces. After serving as a "military police" unit to clear rubble, provide aid, food and shelter to the civilian population and also help dispose of German time bombs and other armaments left behind, the 319th was relieved of its civilian police duties and sent to Northern Ireland where it rejoined the rest of the 82nd Airborne to begin training for the D-Day invasion of Normandy. For its conduct in this offensive, the 319th was awarded its first Presidential Unit Citation, making it the first battalion of the 82nd Airborne to win such an honor in WWII. (Note: some smaller-sized units of the 82nd also won the award because they were selected by Col Darby to be part of his Ranger force along with the 319th)

The 319th and its sister GFAB, the 320th, made two glider assaults behind enemy lines during the Second World War; at St. Mere Eglise on D-Day and at Nijmegen in the Netherlands. The 319th lost approximately 40% of its strength due to death, wounds and injuries sustained by glider crashes and enemy fire on the night of 5–6 June 1944 during the Normandy landings.

Because all of their howitzers were damaged by crash landings, the 319th fought as infantrymen for the first few days supporting the paratroop and glider infantry of the 82nd Airborne during the battles to control the Merderet bridgehead. The glider carrying the commander of the battalion, Col Todd, crash-landed behind German lines and he and the survivors had to fight their way back to the original landing zone to rejoin his men.

Once the battles in Normandy had subsided, the 319th was sent back to England to recoup and regroup along with the rest of the 82nd. A few weeks later, they were ordered to begin preparation for Operation Market Garden, a joint US and British assault on the south-eastern Netherlands to secure the Rhine bridges for a planned invasion of the German Rhineland. The 319th's glider landings in September 1944 took place in daylight (as opposed to the night landings during D-Day) and there were fewer casualties although several gliders did land across the border in Germany (most of these men did not survive). The 319th provided artillery support for the 508th and 504th Parachute Infantry Regiments (82nd) during this campaign and aided in the paratroopers' capture of the critical Nijmegen Bridge.

After almost two months of combat, the 319th was then sent to Northern France for R & R in mid-November 1944. However, less than a month later, they were quickly brought to the front near St. Vith (Belgium) to support the American infantry which sustained heavy losses following the German assault in the Ardennes Offensive. During this engagement, the 319th fought close combat action against several SS Panzer units, frequently with little infantry support (the 82nd lines were stretched over a wide area to the south of St. Vith as a holding action until more US troops could be brought to the battlefront to stem the tide of the advancing SS Panzers).

The 319th then fought with other 82nd units through the Huertgen Forest and across the Rhine into Germany and continued to fire high explosive shells against the enemy until April 1945 when they encountered advancing Russian or Red Army troops. The 319th along with other units of the 82nd Airborne served as the U.S. military honor guard in Berlin in July 1945.

=== Cold War – present ===
On 15 December 1947, the 319th GFAB was reorganized and redesignated as the 319th Field Artillery Battalion. The 319th FAB was withdrawn from the Organized Reserve Corps and allotted to the Regular Army 15 November 1948, and again reorganized and redesignated 15 December 1948 as the 319th Airborne Field Artillery Battalion.

The 319th AFAB was relieved 1 September 1957 from assignment to the 82d Airborne Division; concurrently reorganized and redesignated as the 319th Artillery, a parent regiment under the Combat Arms Regimental System. Under the pentomic organization from 1957 to 1963, elements of the regiment were active in the 82nd Airborne Division (Batteries A, B and C- Battery C until 1960), 101st Airborne Division (Batteries D and E), and with the 25th Infantry Division and United States Army Pacific (Battery C, from 1960–1963).

Under the Reorganization of the Objective Army Division (ROAD) beginning in 1964, 1st Battalion (Airborne), 319th Artillery served with the 82nd Airborne Division; 2nd Battalion (Airborne), 319th Artillery served with the 101st Airborne Division and 3rd Battalion (Airborne), 319th Artillery served with the 173rd Airborne Brigade.

Post-Vietnam reductions saw inactivation of 2nd Battalion (Airborne), 319th Field Artillery and the reassignment of the 3rd Battalion, 319th Field Artillery from the 173rd Airborne Brigade to the 101st Airborne Division.

Reorganized under the U.S. Army Regimental System beginning in 1986, the 82nd Airborne Division Artillery, which at the time was composed of the three active battalions of the 319th Field Artillery, assumed the heritage of the 319th (although the Army continued to officially recognize the two organizations as separate entities). In 1988, Battery D, 319th Field Artillery was activated for service with the airborne battalion combat team, and later the 173rd Airborne Brigade.

=== Further Operational Service by Regimental Elements ===
==== Dominican Republic ====
In April 1965, 1-319 AFAR deployed with the 82nd Airborne Division's 3rd Brigade to the Dominican Republic during Operation Power Pack, and earned Armed Forces Expedition credit for the Dominican Republic.

==== Vietnam ====
During the Vietnam War, 2-319 AFAR deployed with the 101st Airborne Division from November 1967 to December 1971 and 3-319 AFAR deployed with the 173rd Airborne Brigade from May 1965 to July 1971.

==== Grenada ====
In 1983, the 1-319 AFAR took part in Operation Urgent Fury.

==== Panama ====
In December 1989, 3-319 AFAR along with fire support personnel from 1-319 AFAR and 2-319 AFAR participated in Operation Just Cause, gaining Armed Forces Expedition credit with arrowhead for participating in the airborne assault.

==== Gulf War ====
The 82nd Airborne Division Artillery, consisting of Headquarters and Headquarters Battery, 1-319 AFAR, 2-319 AFAR and 3-319 AFAR deployed to Saudi Arabia in August 1990 for Operations Desert Shield and Desert Storm, participating in the Defense of Saudi Arabia, the *Liberation and Defense of Kuwait and Cease-Fire campaigns.

Following the March 1991 cease fire, Battery D, 319 AFAR deployed with the 3d Battalion (Airborne), 325th Infantry to Turkey and northern Iraq for Operation Provide Comfort.

==== Kosovo ====
Batteries from both 1-319 AFAR and 3-319 AFAR participated in peace-keeping operations in Kosovo in 1999.

==== Global War on Terror ====
Since the 9-11 terror attacks, 1-319 AFAR has deployed to Afghanistan twice (Operation Enduring Freedom II and Operation Freedom's Sentinel 2019) and to Iraq four times (Operation Iraqi Freedom I, 2006-2007, 2008-2009, and Operation Inherent Resolve 2015).

The 2-319 AFAR has deployed to Iraq three times, in addition to sending batteries on short notice deployments with infantry battalion task forces on several occasions.

The 3-319 AFAR has deployed to three times to Afghanistan (Operation Enduring Freedom III, 2005-2006, and 2012) and twice to Iraq (Operation Iraqi Freedom 2007-2008 and 2009-2010), with fire support personnel making an additional deployment to Iraq with 1st Brigade, 2-504 PIR, 3-504 PIR and 2-505 PIR in 2004 for Operation Iraqi Freedom I.

Battery D, 319 AFAR participated in Operation Iraqi Freedom I and Operation Enduring Freedom VI.

The 4-319 AFAR has made three combat deployments to Afghanistan.

==== Disaster relief ====
In addition to deploying to the GWOT, elements of the 319th have deployed to disaster relief, both within the United States (2-319 AFAR to Florida after Hurricane Andrew in 1992)(1-319 AFAR to New Orleans after Hurricane Katrina in 2005) and overseas (2-319 AFAR to Haiti in 2010)

==== Operation Atlantic Resolve ====
The 4-319 AFAR has been active in training with NATO forces in Poland, Romania, Latvia, Lithuania, and Estonia as part of Operation Atlantic Resolve. D battery was also part of NATO rapid reaction force the ace mobile force land during cold war the ace stood for allied command Europe

== Current Status of Regimental Elements ==
While all battalions of the 319th Airborne Field Artillery Regiment fall under the 82nd Airborne Division Artillery, each battalions have been assigned to continue general support of their respective brigade combat teams previously assigned. The 319th Airborne Field Artillery Regiment currently has four active components:

- 1st Battalion, 319th Field Artillery Regiment (1-319th Field Artillery Regiment): Active; assigned to the 3rd Brigade Combat Team, 82nd Airborne Division
- 2nd Battalion, 319th Field Artillery Regiment (2-319th Field Artillery Regiment): Active; assigned to the 2nd Brigade Combat Team, 82nd Airborne Division
- 3rd Battalion, 319th Field Artillery Regiment (3-319th Field Artillery Regiment): Active; assigned to the 1st Brigade Combat Team, 82nd Airborne Division
- 4th Battalion, 319th Field Artillery Regiment (4-319th Field Artillery Regiment): Active; assigned to the 173rd Airborne Brigade Combat Team.

== Lineage and honors ==
=== Lineage ===
- Constituted 5 August 1917 in the National Army as the 319th Field Artillery and assigned to the 82d Division.
- Organized 2 September 1917 at Camp Gordon, Georgia.
- Demobilized 18 May 1919 at Camp Dix, New Jersey.
- Reconstituted 24 June 1921 in the Organized Reserves as the 319th Field Artillery and assigned to the 82d Division (later redesignated as the 82d Airborne Division).
- Organized in January 1922 at Decatur, Georgia.
- Reorganized and redesignated 13 February 1942 as the 319th Field Artillery Battalion.
- Ordered into active military service 25 March 1942 and reorganized at Camp Claiborne, Louisiana.
- Reorganized and redesignated 15 August 1942 as the 319th Glider Field Artillery Battalion.
- Reorganized and redesignated 15 December 1947 as the 319th Field Artillery Battalion. (Organized Reserves redesignated 25 March 1948 as the Organized Reserve Corps.)
- Withdrawn 15 November 1948 from the Organized Reserve Corps and allotted to the Regular Army.
- Reorganized and redesignated 15 December 1948 as the 319th Airborne Field Artillery Battalion.
- Relieved 1 September 1957 from assignment to the 82d Airborne Division; concurrently, reorganized and redesignated as the 319th Artillery, a parent regiment under the Combat Arms Regimental System.
- Redesignated 1 September 1971 as the 319th Field Artillery.
- Withdrawn 2 October 1986 from the Combat Arms Regimental System and reorganized under the United States Army Regimental System.

=== Campaign participation credit ===
- World War I: St. Mihiel; Meuse‑Argonne; Lorraine 1918
- World War II: Sicily; Naples‑Foggia; Normandy (with arrowhead); Rhineland (with arrowhead); Ardennes‑Alsace; Central Europe
- Vietnam: Defense; Counteroffensive; Counteroffensive, Phase II; Counteroffensive, Phase III; Tet Counteroffensive; Counteroffensive, Phase IV; Counteroffensive, Phase V; Counteroffensive, Phase VI; Tet 69/Counteroffensive; Summer–Fall 1969; Winter–Spring 1970; Sanctuary Counteroffensive; Counteroffensive, Phase VII; Consolidation I; Consolidation II
- Armed forces expeditions: Dominican Republic; Grenada; Panama (with arrowhead)
- Southwest Asia: Defense of Saudi Arabia; Liberation and Defense of Kuwait; Cease-Fire
- War on Terror:
  - Afghanistan: Consolidation I, Consolidation II, Consolidation III, Transition I
  - Iraq: Liberation of Iraq, Transition of Iraq, National Resolution, Iraqi Surge, Iraqi Sovereignty, New Dawn

Note: The published US Army lineage lists "Campaigns to be determined" as of 2007. Comparison of the deployment dates by regimental battalions with War on Terrorism campaigns shows that the 319th is entitled to the campaigns listed.

=== Decorations ===
- Presidential Unit Citation (Army), Streamer embroidered CHIUNZI PASS (319th Glider Field Artillery Battalion cited; WD GO 41, 1947)
- Presidential Unit Citation (Army), Streamer embroidered STE. MERE EGLISE (319th Glider Field Artillery Battalion cited; WD GO 83, 1944)
- Presidential Unit Citation (Army), Streamer embroidered DAK TO (3d Battalion, 319th Artillery, cited; DA GO 42, 1969)
- Presidential Unit Citation (Army), Streamer embroidered DONG AP BIA MOUNTAIN (2d Battalion, 319th Artillery, cited; DA GO 15, 1972)
- Valorous Unit Award, Streamer embroidered DEFENSE OF SAIGON (2d Battalion, 319th Artillery, cited; DA GO 52, 1974)
- Meritorious Unit Commendation (Army), Streamer embroidered VIETNAM 1965 1967 (3d Battalion, 319th Artillery, cited; DA GO 48, 1968)
- Meritorious Unit Commendation (Army), Streamer embroidered VIETNAM 1968 (2d Battalion, 319th Artillery, cited; DA GO 22, 1976)
- Meritorious Unit Commendation (Army), Streamer embroidered SOUTHWEST ASIA (1st and 2d Battalions, Headquarters and Headquarters Battery, (82nd DIVARTY) 319th Field Artillery, cited; DA GO 1, 1996. 3d Battalion, 319th Field Artillery cited; letter, TAPC-PDA [600-8-22], to Commander, XVIII Airborne Corps and Fort Bragg, Subj: Meritorious Unit Commendation [MUC], 26 August 1998)
- Army Superior Unit Award, Streamer embroidered 1983 (3d Battalion, 319th Field Artillery, cited; DA GO 9, 1987)
- Army Superior Unit Award, Streamer embroidered 1994 (1st Battalion, 319th Field Artillery, cited; DA GO 15, 1997)
- French Croix de Guerre with Palm, World War II, Streamer embroidered STE. MERE EGLISE (319th Glider Field Artillery Battalion cited; DA GO 43, 1950)
- French Croix de Guerre with Palm, World War II, Streamer embroidered COTENTIN (319th Glider Field Artillery Battalion cited; DA GO 43, 1950)
- French Croix de Guerre, World War II, Fourragere (319th Glider Field Artillery Battalion cited; DA GO 43, 1950)
- Military Order of William (Degree of the Knight of the Fourth Class), Streamer embroidered NIJMEGEN 1944 (319th Glider Field Artillery Bat¬talion cited; DA GO 43, 1950)
- Netherlands Orange Lanyard (319th Glider Field Artillery Battalion cited; DA GO 43, 1950)
- Belgian Fourragere 1940 (319th Glider Field Artillery Battalion cited; DA GO 43, 1950)
- Cited in the Order of the Day of the Belgian Army for action at St. Vith (319th Glider Field Artillery Battalion cited; DA GO 43, 1950)
- Cited in the Order of the Day of the Belgian Army for action in the Ardennes (319th Glider Field Artillery Battalion cited; DA GO 43, 1950)
- Cited in the Order of the Day of the Belgian Army for action in Belgium and Germany (319th Glider Field Artillery Battalion cited; DA GO 43, 1950)

2d Battalion RVN Gallantry Cross w/Palm—19 Jul 68–14 May 69, DAGO 43, 70; 18 Apr–31 Aug 71 and 6–19 Sep 71, DAGO 6, 74; 1 Mar–9 Oct 71, DAGO 6, 74 RVN Civil Actions Honor Medal, FC—3 Oct 68–2 May 70, DAGO 48, 71 3d Battalion RVN Gallantry Cross w/Palm—5 May 65–26 Sep 70, DAGO 43, 72 amended DAGO 51, 71 RVN Civil Actions Honor Medal, FC—15 Apr 69–16 Mar 71, DAGO 5, 73 Elements of Headquarters & Service Battery, 3d Battalion Others: (A) Vicinity of Katum, RVN(Abn), 0900–0907 hrs. inclusive, 22 Feb 67 DAGO 18, 79 amended DAGO 48, 71 Remarks: Eligible personnel must provide evidence of participation in Assault Landing Battery A Others: (A) Vicinity of Katum, RVN(Abn), 0900–0907 hrs, inclusive 22 Feb 67 DAGO 18, 79 amended DAGO 48, 71 Battery B Others: (Navy) Presidential Unit Citation—7 Oct–4 Dec 66 DAGO 32, 73

== Heraldry ==
=== Distinctive unit insignia ===
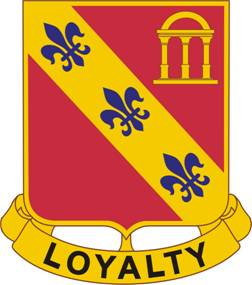

- Description/Blazon: A Gold color metal and enamel device 1 3/16 inches (3.02 cm) in height overall consisting of a shield blazoned: Gules, on a bend Or three fleurs-de-lis, in sinister chief three columns and arch (from the Georgia State seal) of the second. Attached below the shield is a Gold scroll inscribed "LOYALTY" in Black letters.
- Symbolism: Scarlet and yellow are the colors used for Artillery. The three fleurs-de-lis represent the three major engagements in which the Regiment participated in France; the three columns and arch are taken from the State Seal of Georgia, the birthplace of the unit and where it received its early training.
- Background: The distinctive unit insignia was originally approved for the 319th Field Artillery Regiment, Organized Reserves on 25 July 1925. It was redesignated for the 319th Field Artillery Battalion on 22 April 1942. The insignia was redesignated for the 319th Glider Field Artillery Battalion on 21 October 1942. It was redesignated for the 319th Artillery Regiment on 25 August 1958. On 1 September 1971, the insignia was redesignated for the 319th Field Artillery Regiment. It was amended to change the motto from the French ("Loyaute") to the English version ("Loyalty") on 21 January 1972.

=== Coat of arms ===
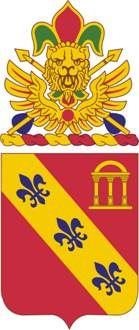

- Description/Blazon

Shield: Gules, on a bend Or three fleurs-de-lis, in sinister chief three columns and arch (from the Georgia State seal) of the second.
Crest: On a wreath of the colors, Or and Gules, in front of two arrows in saltire points up of the first flighted Azure a pair of wings conjoined of the first, feathers shafted of the second, charged at center with a torteau and supporting a fleur-de-lis with center petal of the last and outer petals Vert fimbriated Gold surmounted by a lion's face affronté of the like.
Motto: LOYALTY.

- Symbolism

Shield: Scarlet and yellow are the colors used for Artillery. The three fleurs-de-lis represent the three major engagements in which the Regiment participated in France; the three columns and arch are taken from the State Seal of Georgia, the birthplace of the unit and where it received its early training.
Crest: The wings signify the airborne heritage of the unit, the feathers with red shafts referring to participation in fourteen campaigns in Vietnam; the red disc at center alludes to the scarlet streamer of the Meritorious Unit Commendation awarded also for Vietnamese service. The arrows denote two assault landings in World War II; the feathers are blue in reference to four Presidential Unit Citations, two for World War II service and two for Vietnam. The fleur-de-lis in red and green alludes to the colors of the French Croix de Guerre, awarded three times for service in France, and the lion's face is suggested by the gold lions in the arms of Belgium and of the Netherlands, denoting awards of the Belgian Fourragere, Military Order of William and Netherlands Orange Lanyard for service in World War II.

- Background: The coat of arms was originally approved for the 319th Field Artillery Regiment, Organized Reserves on 25 July 1925. It was redesignated for the 319th Field Artillery Battalion on 22 April 1942. The insignia was redesignated for the 319th Glider Field Artillery Battalion on 21 October 1942. It was redesignated for the 319th Airborne Field Artillery Battalion and amended to remove the crest for the Organized Reserves on 19 January 1950. It was redesignated for the 319th Artillery Regiment on 25 August 1958. On 1 September 1971, the insignia was redesignated for the 319th Field Artillery Regiment. It was amended to change the motto from the French to the English version on 21 January 1972. The coat of arms was amended to add a crest on 26 January 1973.
