= 3rd Battalion, 319th Field Artillery Regiment =

3rd Battalion, 319th Airborne Field Artillery Regiment
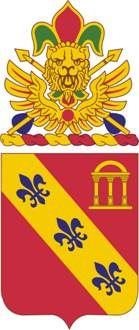
- 319th AFAR coat of arms
- Active: 1917–present
- Country: United States
- Branch: Army
- Type: Airborne field artillery
- Garrison/HQ: Fort Bragg
- Equipment: M119A3 Howitzer; M777A2 Howitzer
- Engagements: World War I World War II; Operation Just Cause; Operations Desert Shield & Desert Storm; Operation Enduring Freedom, Afghanistan; Operation Iraqi Freedom

Commanders
- Notable commanders: Major General Larry Gottardi, 1987–1990; Major General Jay Hood, 1992–1994; Major General Rodney O. Anderson, 1996–1998

Insignia
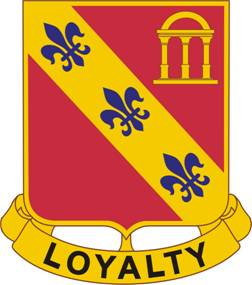
- Distinctive unit insignia

- Organizational beret flash

The 3rd Battalion, 319th Field Artillery Regiment ("3–319th AFAR") is the field artillery battalion that directly supports the 1st Brigade Combat Team, 82nd Airborne Division. Known as the "Gun Devils", 3–319th AFAR has participated in battles from World War I to the current day, and is one of the most highly decorated field artillery units in the United States Army. The battalion's mission is "3-319th AFAR stands ready to deploy worldwide within 18 hours of notification, execute a parachute assault and conduct full-spectrum operations. Specifically, the battalion will provide responsive lethal and nonlethal fires in support of forcible entry and airfield seizure, and integrate and synchronize the effects of fires to achieve the 1BCT commander's intent."

== History ==
=== World War I: origins ===
The 3rd Battalion, 319th Airborne Field Artillery Regiment traces its lineage in Battery C, 319th Field Artillery Regiment. During World War I, the battery was one of six 4-gun 155 mm batteries in the 157th Field Artillery Brigade, and participated in three major offensives: St. Mihiel, Meuse-Argonne, and Lorraine. The first commander of Battery C was Captain D.T. Peavy, who formed the battery on 4 September 1917, from a group of officers recently graduated from the 7th Provisional Training Regiment who had arrived at the regiment on 30 August. In April 1918, Captain Peavy was reassigned to the 157th Depot Brigade, and Captain Strawbridge assumed command of the battery. The battery sailed to Europe on the British liner "Lapland", departing on 19 May 1918, and arriving in Liverpool, England, on 30 May 1918.

=== World War II: airborne beginnings ===
In World War II, the battalion participated in campaigns in North Africa, Chuinzi Pass, Italy, and the Battle of the Bulge.

=== Vietnam ===
==== Deployment ====
The 3-319 AFAR, commanded by LTC (later MG) Lee E. Surut, deployed to South Vietnam in support of the 173rd Airborne Brigade at Bien Hoa Base Camp in May 1965. The unit fired the first American artillery in the Vietnam War, when the base piece of Battery C conducted its first registration. Less than 30 days after deploying, TF Surut (3-319 AFAR reinforced with cavalry, engineers and others) conducted the artillery's first combat air assault when they secured a landing zone, emplaced their howitzers and provided support to infantry TF Dexter. The 3–319th AFAR was the first U.S. Army unit to participate in offensive operations by providing fires support to Army of the Republic of Vietnam (ARVN) forces relieving the town of Dong Xoai in June 1965. It was joined by the 161st Bty, Royal New Zealand Artillery in June 1965 which was attached as the fourth firing battery.

==== OPORD 17–65 ====
From 27 June 1965 to 1 July 1965, 3–319 AFAR fired nearly 5,000 rounds of 105 mm in support of five infantry battalions from three nations (1st Battalion, 503rd Infantry Regiment and 2nd Battalion, 503rd Infantry Regiment from the U.S. 173rd Airborne Brigade, 3rd and 4th Battalions of the ARVN 2nd Airborne Brigade and the 1st Battalion, Royal Australian Regiment), in addition to coordinating New Zealand and Vietnamese artillery fires, close air support and armed helicopter fires through the brigade fire support coordination center. To support what was known simply as OPORD 17–65, 3–319 AFAR provided ten forward observers, three liaison officers and two aerial observers above the normally provided fire support coordination personnel. Initially organized with three six-gun 105 mm firing batteries, the battalion was later authorized a fourth firing battery.

==== Operation Denver ====
On 8 April 1966, the 173rd Airborne Brigade's Operation Austin I was cancelled, and the brigade was notified to conduct Operation Denver in the Sông Bé area. The brigade published its base operation order, focused on movement from Bien Hoa to Sông Bé Base Camp, on 9 April 1966. On 10 April 1966, Battery C, 3/319 accompanied 1/503rd Infantry to Sông Bé Airfield. The remainder of 3/319 arrived via C-130 by 14:40 on 11 April. On 13 April, Battery B was attached to 1/503rd and occupied a fire base at Position Blue to the northwest of Sông Bé to support search and attack operations. Battery B was in position at 09:13, fired preparatory fires on Landing Zone Red in support of Company A, 1/503rd and departed the fire base at 18:32. On 14 April, the battalion fires landing zone preparations on LZs Jade, Opal and Diamond, in support of two battalion-sized airmobile operations by 1/503 and 1RAR. On 15 April, Battery C moved by ground to establish a fire support base at grid location YU 183105, fired a 10-minute artillery preparation on LZ Lilly in support of 1/503, and remained in position until 17 April. On 18 April, Battery A was inserted via CH-47 onto LZ Harvard and established a fire support base to support 2/503 Infantry's operations in AO Ireland, south of Sông Bé. On 19 April, Battery A displaced to LZ Colgate, remaining there in support of 2/503 until 22 April. The battalion returned to Bien Hoa on 23 April, with one battery remaining with 2/503rd at Sông Bé until 25 April. Over the course of Operation Denver, the battalion (including the four guns of 161st Battery, Royal New Zealand Artillery in support of 1 RAR) fired 5,103 rounds in 614 missions. The battalion also controlled the fires of two four-gun 4.2in mortar platoons (one from 2/503rd and one from D/16 Armor) which fired 1,466 rounds in 192 missions.

From 1 May to 31 July 1966, 3/319th AFAR, under the command of LTC William Nordin, supported the brigade's Operations Dexter, Hardihood, Hollandia, Uniontown, Yorktown, Aurora I and Aurora II, in addition to routine security operations. The battalion fired 28,565 rounds during 3,108 missions. The brigade report for this period noted that all tactical plans, including reaction forces, should include the detailed planning of safe air corridors to allow for simultaneous employment of artillery preparations and air strikes during airmobile operations. This was also the last operation with the New Zealand battery which in June amalgamated with the newly-formed 1st Australian Task Force.

==== Operation Toledo ====
From 10 August 1966 – 7 September 1966, 3/319th AFAR supported 173rd's Operation Toledo in the May Tao Secret Zone and Cẩm Mỹ areas of Phước Tuy Province. In addition to the battalion's three organic firing batteries (A, B & C) with 18 105 mm towed howitzers, the battalion was reinforced with C/2/35 Artillery (six 155 mm self-propelled howitzers), A/2/32 Artillery (four 175 mm/8" self-propelled howitzers), and two 105 mm towed firing batteries (A/2/13 Artillery and A/1/7 Artillery). The 3/319th AFAR fired 31,503 rounds in 1,421 fire missions, while the reinforcing units contributed an additional 17,417 rounds. Most of the missions were against suspected enemy locations or in support of elements during contact, but the battalion also fired preparations of landing zones, harassing and interdiction fire, and suppressive fire on landing zones after extraction. Although safety checks and air clearance delayed some missions when units were not in contact, the brigade reported that "Fires for units in contact was timely and no firing delays were experienced."

==== Operation Sioux City ====
From 26 September 1966 to 9 October 1966, the battalion supported the brigade Operation Sioux City with two organic 105 mm batteries and a 155 mm reinforcing battery from 2/25 Field Artillery. On 26 September, 3/319 departed Bien Hoa and moved by road on Route Blue to Position Fox, with Battery C firing landing zone preparations in support of 1/503's air assault on Position Mohawk and then on to Position Mohawk. While in Position Fox, a ¼-ton truck from the battalion hit a mine. Two vehicles (the other from Company E, 17th Cavalry Regiment) were destroyed by mines in Position Fox, resulting in three US wounded. On 1 October, Battery C reported two incoming hand grenades and returned fire with M79 grenade launchers. There were no US casualties and unknown results of the M79 fire. On 6 October, the battalion returned to Position Fox, reporting laid and ready to fire at 12:58. On 9 October, the brigade terminated Operation Sioux City and the battalion returned to Bien Hoa by road convoy. Over the course of the operation, the battalion fired 8,611 rounds on 1,280 missions. Unobserved fires prevented a good assessment of the artillery's effectiveness, although the brigade After Action Report noted that enemy fire stopped "in all cases" when artillery was employed during contacts.

==== Operation Winchester ====
From 8 October – 3 December 1966, Battery B, 3/319th AFAR deployed 82 personnel and six M102 105 mm howitzers with Task Force 4/503rd to the Da Nang and Tinh Qang area to conduct Operation Winchester. The battery occupied a single position, and supported the operation from that position, although it selected alternate positions that were not occupied. The 4–503rd PIR commander stated that Battery B's support was "absolutely essential to the conduct of the operation."

==== Operation Junction City ====
From 22 February to 15 March 1967, 3/319 participated in Operation Junction City, including the only conventional parachute assault conducted by the US Army in Vietnam. For the operation, Battery A was attached to Task Force 2/503rd to conduct the airborne assault, while the battalion received to the operational control of 4.2in mortar platoons from 1/503rd and 4/503rd to provide centralized control of the remaining four firing units for the operation. Operation Junction City was aimed at the destruction of the Central Office of South Vietnam (the Viet Cong political headquarters) and the PAVN 9th Division in the "War Zone C" area of Tây Ninh Province. The brigade formed the north-east shoulder of a multi-brigade cordon. The brigade conducted the parachute assault to ease the requirements for helicopter support and "place the maximum number of troops on the ground in the shortest period of time", although the bulk of the brigade conducted helicopter insertions before their search and destroy operations.

On 19 February, the battalion (less Battery A, which remained at Bien Hoa to prepare for the parachute assault) moved to Quản Lợi Base Camp and conducted final preparations for the operation. At 09:00 on 22 February, Battery A landed with 2/503 PIR on Drop Zone "C" at grid coordinates XT 339929. The battalion then established the brigade Fire Support Base in Position Liz with the brigade command post to support search and destroy operations by the three infantry battalions. On 5 March, the battalion moved by road from FSB Liz to FSB III. On 10 March, the battalion was credited with 127 enemy killed while firing in support of 2nd Battalion, 2nd Infantry (Mechanized) from the 1st Infantry Division. On 14 March, the battalion moved to Suoi Da and returned to Bien Hoa by ground convoy on 15 March. Over the 20 days of the operation, the battalion fired 45,282 rounds in 1,423 missions.

Although the 173rd was not originally planned to participate in Operation Junction City Phase II, the 1st Infantry Division required another brigade and the 173rd returned to the operational control of the 1st Infantry Division on 20 March. That morning, the bulk of 3/319's vehicles departed Bien Hoa at 06:55 and conducted a road movement to FSB "D" at Min Thanh Airfield, arriving at 15:00. The 18 howitzers with crews moved by air at 09:21 and were in position at Minh Thanh at 09:55. On 22 March, the battalion conducted air movement to FSB Parry with 41 CH-47 sorties for personnel and equipment, followed by 31 ammunition sorties. On 23 March, the battalion fired preparation fires on LZ "A" in support of air assaults by 1/503 and 4/503. On 28 March, the battalion conducted direct artillery fire, which effectively decreased the sniper fire against the FSB. On 8 April, Battery A conducted air movement to FSB Rock, joined by Batteries C and B on 9 April. On 13 April, the battalion returned to Bien Hoa, and the brigade terminated its participation in Operation Junction City and was released from the OPCON of the 1st Infantry Division. Over the course of Operation Junction City Phase II, the battalion fired 48,575 rounds in 1,729 missions.

From 1 May to 31 July 1967, 3/319th AFAR, supported seven battalion-size or larger operations: Operations Fort Wayne, Dayton, Cincinnati, Winchester, Francis Marion, Greeley and 4/503rd Infantry's Operation Stillwell. The battalion fired 52,652 rounds during 416 fire missions. The brigade twice noted that units must be prepared to accept casualties from friendly artillery in order to bring effective fires onto enemy positions. (To mitigate any possible tendency to call artillery onto friendly units, the 4th Infantry Division, in their endorsement to the report, noted that artillery can be employed as close as 50 meters "without inflicting more than occasional injuries to friendly troops.") The importance of artillery to the brigade's operations was emphasized by the note in Combat Operations After Action Report for 4–503rd Infantry's contact on 8–18 July 1967 that all individuals should be prepared to quickly and accurately adjust artillery fires.

From 1 August – 31 October 1967, 3/319th AFAR supported Operations Greeley, Bolling and Darby. The battalion fired 46,765 rounds in 6,425 missions. The brigade Operations Report of Lessons Learned for the period noted the requirement for aerial observers for artillery in dense jungle, and suggested that new forward observers should have practical training in aerial observation. Both I Field Force Vietnam and US Army, Vietnam endorsed this observation. The brigade also noted the effectiveness of artillery fires in close support of units in contact, despite "time consuming" safety requirements.

==== Battle of Dak To ====
From August through early October 1967, the 4th Infantry Division, conducting Operation Macarthur, noticed a change in PAVN tactics in Pleiku Province, followed by large and unusual movements in the tri-border (Laos, Cambodia and Vietnam) area and increased activity in Kontum Province in late October. On 1 November, 4/503 Infantry moved to Dak To, followed by Battery B, 3/319 AFAR on 1 November. Battery B emplaced at FSB 12. On 6 November, Batteries A and C followed, emplacing at a bridge site at map coordinates YB 957242 and FSB 13 respectively. Over the next month, the battalion conducted five battery moves, occupying FSBs 12, 15, 16, and 13 to support the brigade's search and attack operations south and west of Dak To. Before the battle of Dak To was ended on 1 December, Battery A fired 12,907 rounds in 488 missions, Battery B fired 14,598 rounds in 590 missions, and Battery C fired 18,112 rounds in 368 missions. The battle for Dak To cost the battalion four killed in action, four wounded in action and one missing in action.

From February to April 1969, the 173rd Airborne Brigade conducted nine battalion operations in Bình Định, Phú Yên and Phu Bon Provinces. On 15 April 1969, the brigade closed all battalion operations and began Operation Washington Green. 3/319 AFAR remained in direct support of the brigade, with headquarters at LZ English and Battery C detached to TF South in direct support to 3/503rd. February began with Battery A at LZ English, Battery B at FSB Shenondoah and Battery D at FSB Barbara. On 4 February, Battery D killed one VC/PAVN, who was found with four satchel charges near the FSB perimeter the next morning. On 9 February, Battery A displaced to FSB Lowboy to support 2/40th ARVN, and Battery D moved to LZ English in 15 CH-47 helicopter loads. From 12–16 February, the battalion fired an "intensive H&I program" ahead of the Tet Holiday. On 21 and 28 February, the battalion emplaced "Red Raider" observation posts to identify anti-aircraft firing positions around LZ English. On 25 February, the battalion fired counterfire against mortars detected by the battalion radar on LZ English, initiating countermortar fire in less than 90 seconds.

In March, Battery A moved from FSB Lowboy to FSB Two Bits to support 1/503rd. On 4 March, Battery D moved by CH-47 from FSB Barbara to Tuy Hòa Base Camp, and then, on 7 March, moved by C-130 to An Khe. On 9 March, Battery D road-marched from An Khe to LZ Action to support Operation Stingray II, which began 11 March. On 14 March, Battery D moved to FSB Ellen by CH-47. On 19 March, a platoon from Battery B conducted a five-hour raid, firing 662 rounds into the An Lao Valley, attacking hooch complexes and possible base camps, resulting in one secondary explosion. On 21 March, the battalion's countermortar radar identified mortar rounds fired at LZ English, as well as a rocket attack on LZ Tom and a mortar attack on Tam Quan District Headquarters. On 23 March, Battery B conducted another platoon raid to FSB Lisa, firing 1113 rounds supporting observation aircraft and brigade Ranger teams. On 24 March, Battery D moved from FSB Ellen to An Khe by CH-47, and road-marched to Qui Nhon the following day. On 26 March, Battery A road-marched from FSB Two Bits to FSB Crystal.

From 1 to 7 April, a platoon from Battery B supported six Ranger teams from FSB Projo, secured by 3/C/2/503 PIR, firing 1460 rounds. On 5 April, Battery D was extracted from FSB Rimerez by CH-47, and then road-marched to FSB Lowboy on 6 April. On 14 April, a platoon from Battery A, with security elements from HSB and Batteries B and D, combat assaulted FSB Robertson and remained until 18 April, firing 1427 rounds in support of 17 Ranger teams. On 17 April, the countermortar radar detected 14 rounds fired at LZ English. On 22 April, elements of Battery A road-marched from LZ Crystal to LZ English, and then combat assaulted to FSB Frost on 25 April. Meanwhile, Battery B road-marched from LZ English to LZ Two Bits to provide mutual support to Battery A, as both batteries secured their own FSBs. On 29 April, the battalion initiated another combined artillery and Ranger raid to FSB Projo. Three slight WIAs were sustained from punji stakes when the elements combat assaulted the FSB, which had been abandoned since 7 April.

From 1 May 1969 to 31 July 1969, 3/319th AFAR continued direct support to 173rd Airborne Brigade conducting Operation Washington Green (pacification in northern Bình Định Province) and Operation Darby Maul I, a series of search and clear operations in the An Lao Valley by 4th Mobile Strike Force Battalion under the operational control of the 173rd. HSB located at LZ English. Battery A located at FSB Frost until 6 July, then FSB Stinger until 12 July, then FSB Lisa until 27 July, then LZ English until 28 July, then LZ Lowboy, in addition to sending a platoon to Operation Red Thrust VIII, firing 508 rounds. Battery B located a LZ Two Bits, and sent a platoon to fire 543 rounds on Operation Red Thrust VII and another platoon to LZ Challenge from 3–5 July. Battery C located at FSB Rock near Bac Loc and conducted two 1-day raids on 11 and 13 June. Battery D located at LZ Lowboy, with two howitzers sent on Operation Red Thrust V in five days ending 2 May. On 12 July, Battery D displaced to support Battery A from FSB Hawkeye but returned to LZ Lowboy until 28 July, then occupied FSB Hunky. The battalion received three 105 mm howitzers in May. In July, LTC John R. Martin replaced LTC Joseph J Leszcsynski. Overall, the battalion fired 55,735 rounds of 105 mm during the period. The battalion noted that the use of two collimators was an effective replacement for the use of aiming posts when occupying constricted platoon sized positions, that low-level illumination was an effective incendiary against enemy crops, and that aerial photos or overflights assisted in the defense of fire support bases, especially when no infantry security forces were provided. Additionally, close liaison in support of Ranger operations assisted in timely and accurate fire support.

=== Post-Vietnam ===
As part of the force reductions after Vietnam, 3-319 AFAR was relieved from its assignment to the 173rd Airborne Brigade and assigned to the 101st Airborne Division. From 2–10 December 1981, 3–319 AFAR conducted a battalion artillery training exercise. The 3-319 AFAR was awarded the Army Superior Unit Award for meritorious service during difficult and challenging missions during peacetime from 20 August 1983 to 1 December 1983.

In March 1988, elements of 3–319 deployed to the Republic of Honduras for Operation Golden Pheasant as a symbol of US resolve to support our allies in the face of aggression.

=== Operation Just Cause ===
In Operation Just Cause, A Battery, 3–319th AFAR conducted a parachute drop of its howitzers, assisting in defeating the Panamanian Defense Forces.

=== Operation Desert Storm ===
3–319th AFAR supported the 1st Brigade, 82nd Airborne Division during the Gulf War. A few years later, C Battery, 3–319th deployed to Kosovo.

=== Global War on Terror ===
The battalion deployed to Afghanistan in 2003, 2005–2006 and 2011–2012. The battalion has deployed twice to Iraq in support of Operation Iraqi Freedom, once in 2007–2008 to LSA Adder near Tallil, Dhi Qar Province and again in 2009–2010 with 1st Brigade Combat Team to Al Asad Airbase in Anbar Province.

==== Operation Enduring Freedom III ====
Elements of TF Devil (built around the 1st Brigade, 82nd Airborne Division), including 3–319, deployed to relieve TF Panther from December 2002 through August 2003. Like 1–319 AFAR during OEF II, 3-319 AFAR deployed as two 4-tube 120 mm mortar batteries (Batteries A & B) and one 6-gun M119 105 mm battery (Battery C) under the command of LTC Dennis Tewksbury. During this deployment, 3-319 was awarded a Valorous Unit Award for the period 17 January 2003 to 17 August 2003.

==== Operation Iraqi Freedom I ====
After returning from their OEF III rotation to Afghanistan, fire support elements of 3–319 deployed to Iraq with 1st Brigade from January to April 2004. On 27 January 2004, Sergeant Cory R. Mracek, a forward observer from A/3-319, was killed by an IED near Iskandariyah, Iraq.

==== Operation Enduring Freedom VI ====
From February to April 2005, 3–319 AFAR (HSB, B Battery and C Battery) and D/319 AFAR deployed to OEF VI. While the three firing batteries and an attached radar detachment (234 Field Artillery Detachment) provided fires through southern and eastern Afghanistan, the battalion also formed the headquarters of Task Force Gun Devil, controlling infantry companies A/1-325, D/2-504 and B/1-508, 74th LRS, provisional maneuver elements formed from HSB/3-319 and U.S. Army military police as well as Romanian infantry. During this deployment, 3-319 AFAR was commanded by LTC Bert Ges.

==== Operation Iraqi Freedom 2009–10 ====
From September 2009 to September 2010, 3–319, commanded by LTC Jose Thompson, deployed with 1st Brigade Combat Team, 82nd Airborne Division to Al Anbar province in western Iraq as an "advise and assist brigade". While there, the battalion conducted combined airborne operations as well as indirect live fire training with Iraqi forces. The battalion earned the Meritorious Unit Commendation for the period 24 January 2010 to 28 July 2010.

==== Operation Enduring Freedom 2012 ====
The 3–319th AFAR returned to Afghanistan, providing fire support to TF Devil operations in Ghazni province. Under the command of LTC David Pierce, the battalion served a traditional field artillery mission, not as a provisional maneuver unit, and focused on the counterfire fight. HHB and Battery B were awarded the Meritorious Unit Commendation for their actions from 16 February 2012 to 15 September 2012.

In 2013, the battalion was the first operational unit to field the M119A3 howitzer.

==== Operation Resolute Support ====
In August 2021, the battalion deployed on short notice to participate in the final evacuation of U.S. forces from Afghanistan. The battalion was awarded a Presidential Unit Citation for its participation in the evacuation of Hamid Karzai International Airport in August 2021.

== Lineage and honors ==
=== Lineage ===
- Constituted 5 August 1917 in the National Army as Battery C, 319th Field Artillery, an element of the 82d Division.
- Organized 2 September 1917 at Camp Gordon, Georgia.
- Demobilized 18 May 1919 at Camp Dix, New Jersey.
- Reconstituted 24 June 1921 in the Organized Reserves as Battery C, 319th Field Artillery, an element of the 82d Division (later redesignated as the 82d Airborne Division).
- Organized in January 1922 at Decatur, Georgia.
- Reorganized and redesignated 13 February 1942 as Battery C, 319th Field Artillery Battalion.
- Ordered into active military service 25 March 1942 and reorganized at Camp Claiborne, Louisiana. *Reorganized and redesignated 15 August 1942 as Battery C, 319th Glider Field Artillery Battalion.
- Reorganized and redesignated 15 December 1947 as Battery C, 319th Field Artillery Battalion.

(Organized Reserves redesignated 25 March 1948 as the Organized Reserve Corps.)

- Withdrawn 15 November 1948 from the Organized Reserve Corps and allotted to the Regular Army.
- Reorganized and redesignated 15 December 1948 as Battery C, 319th Airborne Field Artillery Battalion.
- Reorganized and redesignated 1 September 1957 as Battery C, 319th Field Artillery, an element of the 82d Airborne Division.
- Relieved 24 June 1960 from assignment to the 82d Airborne Division and assigned to the 25th Infantry Division.
- Relieved 1 July 1961 from assignment to the 25th Infantry Division.
- Reorganized and redesignated 25 June 1963 as Headquarters and Headquarters Battery, 3d Battalion, 319th Artillery, and assigned to the 173d Airborne Brigade (organic elements constituted 26 March 1963 and activated 25 June 1963).
- Redesignated 1 September 1971 as the 3d Battalion, 319th Field Artillery.
- Relieved 14 January 1972 from assignment to the 173d Airborne Brigade and assigned to the 101st Airborne Division.
- Relieved 2 October 1986 from assignment to the 101st Airborne Division and assigned to the 82d Airborne Division.

=== Campaign participation credit ===
- World War I: St. Mihiel; Meuse Argonne; Lorraine 1918
- World War II: Sicily; Naples Foggia; Normandy (with arrowhead); Rhineland (with arrowhead); Ardennes Alsace; Central Europe
- Vietnam: Defense; Counteroffensive; Counteroffensive, Phase II; Counteroffensive, Phase III; Tet Counteroffensive; Counteroffensive, Phase IV; Counteroffensive, Phase V; Counteroffensive Phase VI; Tet 69/Counteroffensive; Summer Fall 1969; Winter Spring 1970; Sanctuary Counteroffensive; Counteroffensive, Phase VII; Consolidation I
- Armed forces expeditions: Panama (with arrowhead)
- Southwest Asia: Defense of Saudi Arabia; Liberation and Defense of Kuwait; Cease-Fire
- War on Terrorism
  - Afghanistan: Consolidation I, Transition I
  - Iraq: Iraqi Surge; Iraqi Sovereignty

Note: The published US Army lineage lists "Campaigns to be determined" as of 2007. Comparison of the battalion's deployment dates with War on Terrorism campaigns shows that the battalion is entitled to the campaigns listed.

=== Decorations ===
- Presidential Unit Citation (Army), Streamer embroidered CHIUNZI PASS
- Presidential Unit Citation (Army), Streamer embroidered STE. MERE EGLISE
- Presidential Unit Citation (Army), Streamer embroidered DAK TO
- Presidential Unit Citation (Army), Streamer embroidered HAMID KARZAI INTERNATIONAL AIRPORT 2021
- Meritorious Unit Commendation (Army), Streamer embroidered VIETNAM 1965 1967
- Meritorious Unit Commendation (Army), Streamer embroidered SOUTHWEST ASIA
- Meritorious Unit Commendation (Army), Streamer embroidered IRAQ 2010
- Army Superior Unit Award, Streamer embroidered 1983
- French Croix de Guerre with Palm, World War II, Streamer embroidered STE. MERE EGLISE
- French Croix de Guerre with Palm, World War II, Streamer embroidered COTENTIN
- French Croix de Guerre, World War II, Fourragere
- Military Order of William (Degree of the Knight of the Fourth Class) Streamer embroidered NIJMEGEN 1944
- Netherlands Orange Lanyard
- Belgian Fourragere 1940
  - Cited in the Order of the Day of the Belgian Army for action at St. Vith
  - Cited in the Order of the Day of the Belgian Army for action in the Ardennes
  - Cited in the Order of the Day of the Belgian Army for action in Belgium and Germany
- Republic of Vietnam Cross of Gallantry with Palm, Streamer embroidered VIETNAM 1965 1970
- Republic of Vietnam Civil Action Honor Medal, First Class, Streamer embroidered VIETNAM 1970 1971

Headquarters and Headquarters Battery additionally entitled to:
- Meritorious Unit Commendation (Army), Streamer embroidered AFGHANISTAN 2012
Battery B additionally entitled to:
- Presidential Unit Citation (Navy), Streamer embroidered VIETNAM 1966
- Meritorious Unit Commendation (Army), Streamer embroidered AFGHANISTAN 2012
Battery C additionally entitled to:
- Valorous Unit Award, Streamer embroidered TUY HOA

== Heraldry ==
=== Distinctive unit insignia ===
319th Field Artillery Regiment Distinctive Unit Insignia

=== Coat of arms ===
319th Field Artillery Regiment Coat of Arms
