= 1st Battalion, 319th Field Artillery Regiment =

1st Battalion, 319th Airborne Field Artillery Regiment
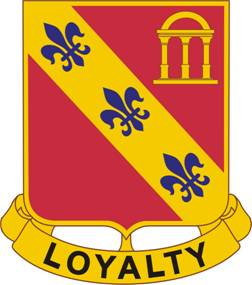
- 319th AFAR distinctive unit insignia
- Active: 1917–present
- Country: United States
- Branch: Army
- Type: Airborne field artillery
- Garrison/HQ: Fort Bragg
- Nickname: Loyalty
- Equipment: M119A3; M777A2; AN/TPQ-50; AN/TPQ-53

Insignia
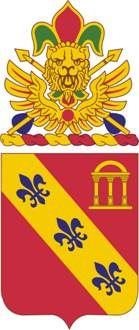
- 319th AFAR coat of arms

- Unit flash

The 1st Battalion, 319th Airborne Field Artillery Regiment ("1-319 AFAR") is the airborne field artillery battalion assigned to the 3rd Brigade Combat Team, 82nd Airborne Division. Nicknamed "Loyalty", 1–319 AFAR has deployed to conduct combat operations in the Dominican Republic, Grenada, Kuwait, Afghanistan and three separate deployments to Iraq. Most recently, the battalion deployed to Afghanistan in support of Operation Freedom Sentinel.

== History ==
=== Origins ===
Battery A, 319th Artillery (A/319) served in World War I with the 319th Field Artillery Regiment, and in World War II with the 319th Glider Field Artillery Battalion. Under the Pentomic organization, A/319 served as a direct support battery in the 82nd Airborne Division Artillery. Under the Combat Arms Regimental System and the Reorganization Objective Army Division, A/319 was reorganized and redesignated as 1-319 AFAR, a direct support battalion in the 82nd Airborne Division Artillery, on 25 May 1964.

=== Cold War ===
In April 1965, 1-319 AFAR deployed with the 82nd Airborne Division's 3rd Brigade to the Dominican Republic during Operation Powerpack, and earned campaign credit for the Dominican Republic Armed Forces Expedition.

In September 1974, 1-319 AFAR participated with 3rd Brigade in Exercise Gobi Express V at Fort Bliss, Texas. C/1-319 AFAR, commanded by CPT Gregory L. Shawn, employed innovative camouflage techniques to remain undetected by the opposing forces throughout the exercise, even after the battery's grid location was provided to opposing forces reconnaissance aircraft.

In 1983, 1-319 AFAR took part in Operation Urgent Fury, the Invasion of Grenada as part of the 82d Airborne Division. The 1-319 AFAR deployed two tailored batteries of three guns each (Batteries A and B) and a battalion command post. The 1-319 AFAR earned Armed Forces Expedition credit for "Grenada".

In 1994, 1-319 AFAR was awarded the Army Superior Unit Award for peacetime service as part of Task Force Outload, from 10 September 2004 to 2 October 1994, during Operation Uphold Democracy.

In 1999, C/1-319 AFAR earned the Army Superior Unit Award for its service in Kosovo with TF 2-505 PIR.

=== Operation Enduring Freedom II ===
The first element of the 319th Field Artillery to deploy to combat in the Global War on Terror (GWOT), 1-319 AFAR, deployed as part of Task Force (TF) Panther (built around the 3rd Brigade, 82nd Airborne Division) from June 2002 to January 2003. LTC Charles K. Hardy was the battalion Commander. Batteries A and B of 1-319 AFAR manned M120 120 mm mortars, while Battery C, 1-319 AFAR manned M119 105 mm howitzers.

In 2002, B/1-319 AFAR was selected as the recipient of the Knox Award, recognizing the best field artillery battery in the Army, as a result of this deployment.

=== Operation Iraqi Freedom I ===
After returning from their OEF II rotation to Afghanistan, 1-319 AFAR deployed to Iraq with 3rd Brigade from summer 2003 to spring 2004.

=== Operation Iraqi Freedom 2006–07 ===
In August 2006, 1-319 AFAR deployed with 3rd BCT, 82nd Airborne Division, replacing the 3-320 FA around the towns of Tikrit and Ad Dawr in Saladin Governorate. Although expected to last one year, the deployment was extended to 15 months due to "The Surge" and the unit returned in November 2007. The 1-319 AFAR, commanded by LTC Barry DiRuzza, formed the core of Task Force Loyalty and operated as a provisional maneuver task force, conducting partnered training and joint operations with Iraqi Security Forces as well as other security and non-kinetic operations.

=== Operation Iraqi Freedom 2008–09 ===
1-319 AFAR deployed for a third time to Iraq in December 2008, this time to the al-Karradah district of Baghdad. The BN returned to Fort Bragg in November of 2009, having earned its third Meritorious Unit Commendation.

=== Operation Inherent Resolve ===
The battalion deployed during Operation Inherent Resolve in January 2015. Task Force Loyalty assumed an advise and assist role alongside the 1st Infantry Division. The battalion returned to Fort Bragg in September 2015.

=== Other significant activities ===
Two members of the battalion have earned the Field Artillery Association's annual Gruber award since the award's establishment in 2002 to recognize outstanding individual thought and innovation that results in significant contributions to or the enhancement of the field artillery's warfighting capabilities, morale, readiness or maintenance. The 2005 Gruber Award winner was SFC Craig Brown, brigade fire support NCO in HHB, 1-319 AFAR. The 2009 Gruber Award Winner was SFC Brandon Aguilar, a platoon sergeant in Battery B, 1-319.

On 21 January 2013, over 300 paratroopers from 1-319 AFAR participated in the 57th Presidential inauguration in Washington, D.C.

== Lineage and honors ==
=== Lineage ===
- Constituted 5 August 1917 in the National Army as Battery A, 319th Field Artillery, an element of the 82d Division
- Organized 2 September 1917 at Camp Gordon, Georgia
- Demobilized 18 May 1919 at Camp Dix, New Jersey
- Reconstituted 24 June 1921 in the Organized Reserves as Battery A, 319th Field Artillery, an element of the 82d Division (later redesignated as the 82d Airborne Division)
- Organized in January 1922 at Decatur, Georgia
- Reorganized and redesignated 13 February 1942 as Battery A, 319th Field Artillery Battalion
- Ordered into active military service 25 March 1942 and reorganized at Camp Claiborne, Louisiana
- Reorganized and redesignated 15 August 1942 as Battery A, 319th Glider Field Artillery Battalion
- Reorganized and redesignated 15 December 1947 as Battery A, 319th Field Artillery Battalion

(Organized Reserves redesignated 25 March 1948 as the Organized Reserve Corps)

- Withdrawn 15 November 1948 from the Organized Reserve Corps and allotted to the Regular Army
- Reorganized and redesignated 15 December 1948 as Battery A, 319th Airborne Field Artillery Battalion
- Reorganized and redesignated 1 September 1957 as Battery A, 319th Artillery, an element of the 82d Airborne Division
- Reorganized and redesignated 25 May 1964 as Headquarters, Headquarters and Service Battery, 1st Battalion, 319th Artillery (organic elements constituted 6 March 1964 and activated 25 May 1964)
- Redesignated 1 September 1971 as the 1st Battalion, 319th Field Artillery
- Redesignated 1 October 2005 as the 1st Battalion, 319th Field Artillery Regiment

=== Campaign participation credit ===
- World War I: St. Mihiel; Meuse-Argonne; Lorraine 1918
- World War II: Sicily; Naples Foggia; Normandy (with arrowhead); Rhineland (with arrowhead); Ardennes Alsace; Central Europe
- Armed Forces Expeditions:Dominican Republic; Grenada
- Southwest Asia:Defense of Saudi Arabia; Liberation and Defense of Kuwait; Cease-Fire
- War on Terrorism:Campaigns to be determined
  - Afghanistan: Consolidation I
  - Iraq: Transition of Iraq; National Resolution; Iraqi Surge; Iraqi Sovereignty

Note: The published US Army lineage lists "Campaigns to be determined" as of 2012. Comparison of the deployment dates by the battalion with War on Terrorism campaigns estimates that the battalion is entitled to the campaigns listed.

=== Decorations ===
- Presidential Unit Citation (Army), Streamer embroidered CHIUNZI PASS
- Presidential Unit Citation (Army), Streamer embroidered STE. MERE EGLISE
- Valorous Unit Award, Streamer embroidered IRAQ 2003-2004
- Meritorious Unit Commendation (Army), Streamer embroidered SOUTHWEST ASIA 1990-1991
- Meritorious Unit Commendation (Army), Streamer embroidered IRAQ 2006-2007
- Meritorious Unit Commendation (Army), Streamer embroidered IRAQ 2008-2009
- Army Superior Unit Award, Streamer embroidered 1994
- French Croix de Guerre with Palm, World War II, Streamer embroidered STE. MERE EGLISE
- French Croix de Guerre with Palm, World War II, Streamer embroidered COTENTIN
- French Croix de Guerre, World War II, Fourragere
- Military Order of William (Degree of the Knight of the Fourth Class), Streamer embroidered NIJMEGEN 1944
- Netherlands Orange Lanyard
- Belgian Fourragere 1940
  - Cited in the Order of the Day of the Belgian Army for action at St. Vith
  - Cited in the Order of the Day of the Belgian Army for action in the Ardennes
  - Cited in the Order of the Day of the Belgian Army for action in Belgium and Germany

Battery C additionally entitled to:
- Army Superior Unit Award, Streamer embroidered 1999

== Heraldry ==
=== Distinctive unit insignia ===
319th Field Artillery Regiment Distinctive Unit Insignia

=== Coat of arms ===
319th Field Artillery Regiment Coat of Arms

== Current Organization ==
- Headquarters/Headquarters Battery "Warhammer"
- Alpha Battery "Gators"
- Bravo Battery "Bulls"
- Charlie Battery "Cobra Strike"
