= Fourth Allied Tactical Air Force =

Former NATO military aviation formation

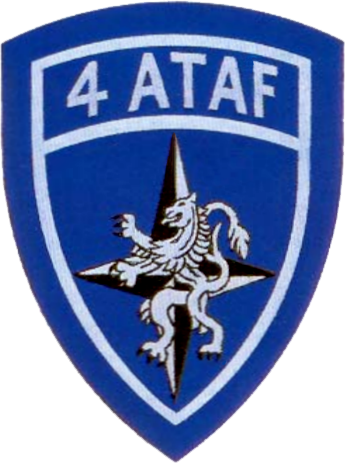
- Fourth Allied Tactical Air Force insignia
- Active: 1951–1993
- Disbanded: 30 June 1993
- Countries: Canada; United States; West Germany
- Allegiance: (NATO) North Atlantic Treaty Organization
- Part of: Allied Air Forces Central Europe
- Headquarters: Trier Air Base (1951–1958); Ramstein Air Base (1958–1980); Heidelberg (1980–1993)

Fourth Allied Tactical Air Force (4 ATAF) was a NATO military formation under Allied Air Forces Central Europe tasked with providing air support to NATO's Central Army Group (CENTAG) in the southern portion of West Germany. 4 ATAF commanded all flying units based within its sector and all reinforcements flying into its sector, as well as ground-based radar systems and stations, air defense units and the airfields in its sector.

== History ==
Fourth Allied Tactical Air Force was formed in 1951 with its area of responsibility covering Germany south of the city of Kassel. Commander of Fourth Allied Tactical Air Force at its inception was the commanding Major General of the American Twelfth Air Force based in the southwest of Germany. After Twelfth Air Force returned to the continental United States in 1958, the commander of Seventeenth Air Force took over command of Fourth Allied Tactical Air Force.

Headquarters 4 ATAF moved several times over more than forty years. Established about 1951 at Trier Air Base, the headquarters was moved to Ramstein Air Base in November 1957 where it remained until December 1980 when it was moved to Heidelberg where it was colocated with Headquarters Central Army Group. An operational Air Defence Operations Centre was operated at Ouvrage Molvange from 1961 until 1967 when it was moved to a USAF site in Kindsbach just south of Ramstein Air Base. The headquarters also operated a number of communications sites which were concerned with secure communications for the release of tactical nuclear weapons through the NATO Quick Reaction Alert Force. In 1985 NATO began with the construction of a new Static War Headquarters bunker in Ruppertsweiler, Germany. Fourth Allied Tactical Air Force commanded alongside Seventeenth Air Force, the U.S. 32nd Army Air Defense Command, 1 Canadian Air Group and two German Air Force (Luftwaffe) divisions, as well as extensive secure communications, air defense and radar installations operated by Germany and the U.S. Air Force.

If needed, 4 ATAF would have been reinforced with units from the US Third (UK based), Eighth (reconnaissance and bombing), Ninth (immediate reinforcements) and Twelfth Air Force (follow on reinforcements), and with Royal Canadian Air Force and French Air Force units. At the start of hostilities 4 ATAF would have had immediately around 600 combat aircraft at its disposal.

4 ATAF was disbanded on 30 June 1993, with its duties taken over by Allied Air Forces Central Europe. Prior to that point, the following units would have come under command of Fourth Allied Tactical Air Force during wartime:

== Wartime organization c.1989 ==
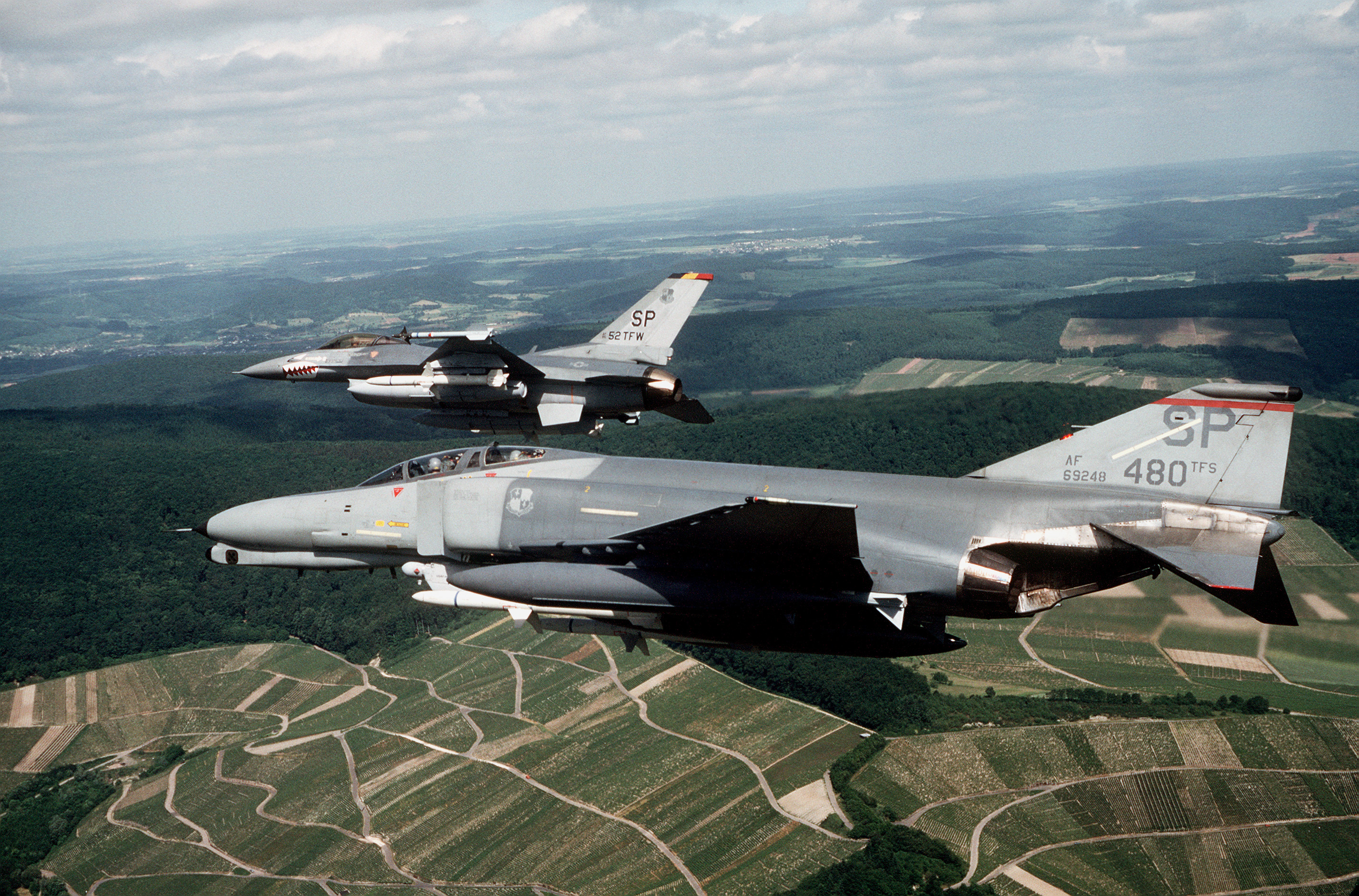
A F-4G Phantom II Wild Weasel from 480th Tactical Fighter Squadron and a F-16C Block 30 Falcon from 52nd Tactical Fighter Wing Commander fly over Germany in June 1989

- Fourth Allied Tactical Air Force, Heidelberg, FRG
  - Air Defence Operations Center (ADOC), Maastricht
    - Sector Operations Center 3 (SOC 3), Sembach Air Base
      - 1st Btn, 32nd (Luftwaffe) Signal Regiment, Control and Reporting Center Börfink
      - 2nd Btn, 32nd (Luftwaffe) Signal Regiment, Control and Reporting Center Lauda-Königshofen
      - 4th Btn, 32nd (Luftwaffe) Regiment, Lauda-Königshofen, with 12× mobile Radar systems forward deployed to the inner German border.
    - Sector Operations Center 4 (SOC 4), Meßstetten
      - 1st Btn, 31st (Luftwaffe) Signal Regiment, Control and Reporting Center Meßstetten
      - 2nd Btn, 31st (Luftwaffe) Signal Regiment, Control and Reporting Center Freising

=== Seventeenth Air Force ===
- Seventeenth Air Force, (US Air Force) Sembach Air Base
  - 65th Air Division, at Lindsey Air Station
    - 52nd Tactical Fighter Wing, at Spangdahlem Air Base
      - 23rd Tactical Fighter Squadron, with 12× F-4G Phantom II Wild Weasel and 12× F-16C Block 25 Falcon
      - 81st Tactical Fighter Squadron, with 12× F-4G Phantom II Wild Weasel and 12× F-16C Block 25 Falcon
      - 480th Tactical Fighter Squadron, with 12× F-4G Phantom II Wild Weasel and 12× F-16C Block 25 Falcon
    - 66th Electronic Combat Wing, at Sembach Air Base
      - 43rd Electronic Combat Squadron, with EC-130H Compass Call
  - 316th Air Division, at Ramstein Air Base
    - 86th Tactical Fighter Wing, at Ramstein Air Base
      - 512th Tactical Fighter Squadron, with 24× F-16C Block 30 Falcon
      - 526th Tactical Fighter Squadron, with 24× F-16C Block 30 Falcon
  - 26th Tactical Reconnaissance Fighter Wing, at Zweibrücken Air Base
    - 38th Tactical Reconnaissance Squadron, with 22× RF-4C Phantom II
  - 36th Tactical Fighter Wing, at Bitburg Air Base
    - 22nd Tactical Fighter Squadron, with 24× F-15C Eagle
    - 53rd Tactical Fighter Squadron, with 24× F-15C Eagle
    - 525th Tactical Fighter Squadron, with 24× F-15C Eagle
  - 50th Tactical Fighter Wing, at Hahn Air Base
    - 10th Tactical Fighter Squadron, with 24× F-16C Block 25 Falcon
    - 313th Tactical Fighter Squadron, with 24× F-16C Block 25 Falcon
    - 496th Tactical Fighter Squadron, with 24× F-16C Block 25 Falcon
  - 601st Tactical Control Wing, at Sembach Air Base (operating AN/TPS-43 mobile radars)

=== 32nd Army Air Defense Command ===
- 32nd Army Air Defense Command, (US Army) Darmstadt
  - Headquarters and Headquarters Battery, Darmstadt
  - 11th Signal Battalion (Air Defense), Darmstadt
  - 10th Air Defense Artillery Brigade, Darmstadt
    - Headquarters and Headquarters Battery, Darmstadt
    - 2nd Battalion, 43rd Air Defense Artillery, Hanau, (48× MIM-104 Patriot)
    - 4th Battalion, 43rd Air Defense Artillery, Giessen, (48× MIM-104 Patriot)
    - 3rd Battalion, 52nd Air Defense Artillery, Wildflecken, (24× MIM-23 Hawk, 8× FIM-92 Stinger)
  - 69th Air Defense Artillery Brigade, Würzburg
    - Headquarters and Headquarters Battery, Würzburg
    - 6th Battalion, 43rd Air Defense Artillery, Ansbach, (48× MIM-104 Patriot)
    - 8th Battalion, 43rd Air Defense Artillery, Giebelstadt, (48× MIM-104 Patriot)
    - 6th Battalion, 52nd Air Defense Artillery, Würzburg, (24× MIM-23 Hawk, 8× FIM-92 Stinger)
    - 3rd Battalion, 60th Air Defense Artillery, Grafenwöhr, (24× MIM-23 Hawk, 8× FIM-92 Stinger, disbanded November 1989)
  - 94th Air Defense Artillery Brigade, Kaiserslautern
    - Headquarters and Headquarters Battery, Kaiserslautern
    - 4th Battalion, 1st Air Defense Artillery, Neubrücke, (24× MIM-23 Hawk, 8× FIM-92 Stinger)
    - 1st Battalion, 7th Air Defense Artillery, Kaiserslautern, (48× MIM-104 Patriot)
    - 3rd Battalion, 44th Air Defense Artillery, Ramstein, (24× MIM-72 Chaparral, 24× M163 VADS Vulcan, 15× FIM-92 Stinger)
  - 108th Air Defense Artillery Brigade, Spangdahlem
    - Headquarters and Headquarters Battery, Spangdahlem
    - 1st Battalion, 1st Air Defense Artillery, Spangdahlem, (24× MIM-23 Hawk, 8× FIM-92 Stinger)
    - 4th Battalion, 7th Air Defense Artillery, Dexheim, (48× MIM-104 Patriot)
    - 5th Battalion, 7th Air Defense Artillery, Bitburg, (48× MIM-104 Patriot)
    - 5th Battalion, 44th Air Defense Artillery, Spangdahlem, (24× MIM-72 Chaparral, 24× M163 VADS Vulcan, 15× FIM-92 Stinger)
  - 32nd Support Command (Air Defense), Worms
    - Headquarters and Headquarters Company, Worms
    - 334th Ordnance Company, Wildflecken
    - 565th Ordnance Company, Pirmasens
    - 569th Ordnance Company, Würzburg
    - 574th Ordnance Company, Grafenwöhr
    - 576th Ordnance Company, Neubrücke
    - 606th Ordnance Company, Bitburg Air Base
    - 611th Ordnance Company, Bruchmühlbach-Miesau (Miesau Ammunition Depot)
    - 820th Ordnance Company, Bitburg Air Base
    - 19th Maintenance Company, Bitburg Air Base
    - 57th Maintenance Company, Giebelstadt Army Airfield
    - 91st Maintenance Company, Ansbach
    - 178th Maintenance Company, Dexheim
    - 518th Maintenance Company, Giessen
    - 549th Maintenance Company, Kaiserslautern
    - 555th Maintenance Company, Hanau
    - 247th Chemical Detachment, Darmstadt

=== 1. Luftwaffendivision ===
- 1. Luftwaffendivision (German Air Force), Fürstenfeldbruck
  - Bremgarten Air Base
    - Aufklärungsgeschwader 51, 2 × squadrons with 15 × RF-4E (Reconnaissance)
  - Landsberg am Lech
    - Flugkörpergeschwader 1, 4 × squadrons with 9 × Pershing 1a
  - Lechfeld Air Base
    - Jagdbombergeschwader 32, 2 × squadrons with 16 × Tornado IDS each, and 6× Tornado IDS in reserve
  - Büchel Air Base
    - Jagdbombergeschwader 33^{note 1}, 2× squadrons with 16× Tornado IDS each, and 6× Tornado IDS in reserve
  - Memmingen Air Base
    - Jagdbombergeschwader 34^{note 1}, 2× squadrons with 16× Tornado IDS each, and 6× Tornado IDS in reserve
  - Pferdsfeld Air Base
    - Jagdbombergeschwader 35, 2× squadrons with 15× F-4F each, and 4× F-4F in reserve
  - Leipheim Air Base
    - Jagdbombergeschwader 44, 1st squadron permanently deployed to Beja Airbase in Portugal with 18× Alpha Jets for weapons training
  - Fürstenfeldbruck Air Base
    - Jagdbombergeschwader 49, 2× squadrons with 18× Alpha Jets each, and 24× Alpha Jets in reserve (18× for 2nd squadron Jagdbombergeschwader 44)

=== 2. Luftwaffendivision ===
- 2. Luftwaffendivision (German Air Force), Birkenfeld
  - Neuburg Air Base
    - Jagdgeschwader 74, 2× squadrons with 15× F-4F each, and 4× F-4F in reserve
  - 4th Air Defense Missile Command, Lich
    - 21st Air Defense Missile Wing, Möhnesee, with 6× MIM-104 Patriot squadrons; each with 1× Engagement Control Station, 1× Radar Set, 8× launch stations
    - 38th Air Defense Missile Wing, Burbach, with 4× MIM-23 Hawk squadrons; each with 1× Hawk battery (6× launch stations)
    - 42nd Air Defense Missile Group, Schöneck, with 42× Roland systems guarding Rhein-Main, Sembach, Nörvenich, Pferdsfeld and Büchel air bases and Lindsey Air Station
  - 5th Air Defense Missile Command, Erding
    - 23rd Air Defense Missile Wing, Manching, with 6× MIM-104 Patriot squadrons; each with 1× Engagement Control Station, 1× Radar Set, 8× launch stations
    - 32nd Air Defense Missile Wing, Freising, with 4× MIM-23 Hawk squadrons; each with 1× Hawk battery (6× launch stations)
    - 34th Air Defense Missile Wing, Rottenburg an der Laaber, with 4× MIM-23 Hawk squadrons; each with 1× Hawk battery (6× launch stations)
  - 6th Air Defense Missile Command, Lenggries
    - 22nd Air Defense Missile Wing, Penzing, with 6× MIM-104 Patriot squadrons; each with 1× Engagement Control Station, 1× Radar Set, 8× launch stations
    - 33rd Air Defense Missile Wing, Lenggries, with 4× MIM-23 Hawk squadrons; each with 1× Hawk battery (6× launch stations)
    - 43rd Air Defense Missile Group, Leipheim, with 26× Roland systems guarding Lechfeld, Memmingen, Erding, Neuburg and Bremgarten air bases

=== 1 Canadian Air Division ===
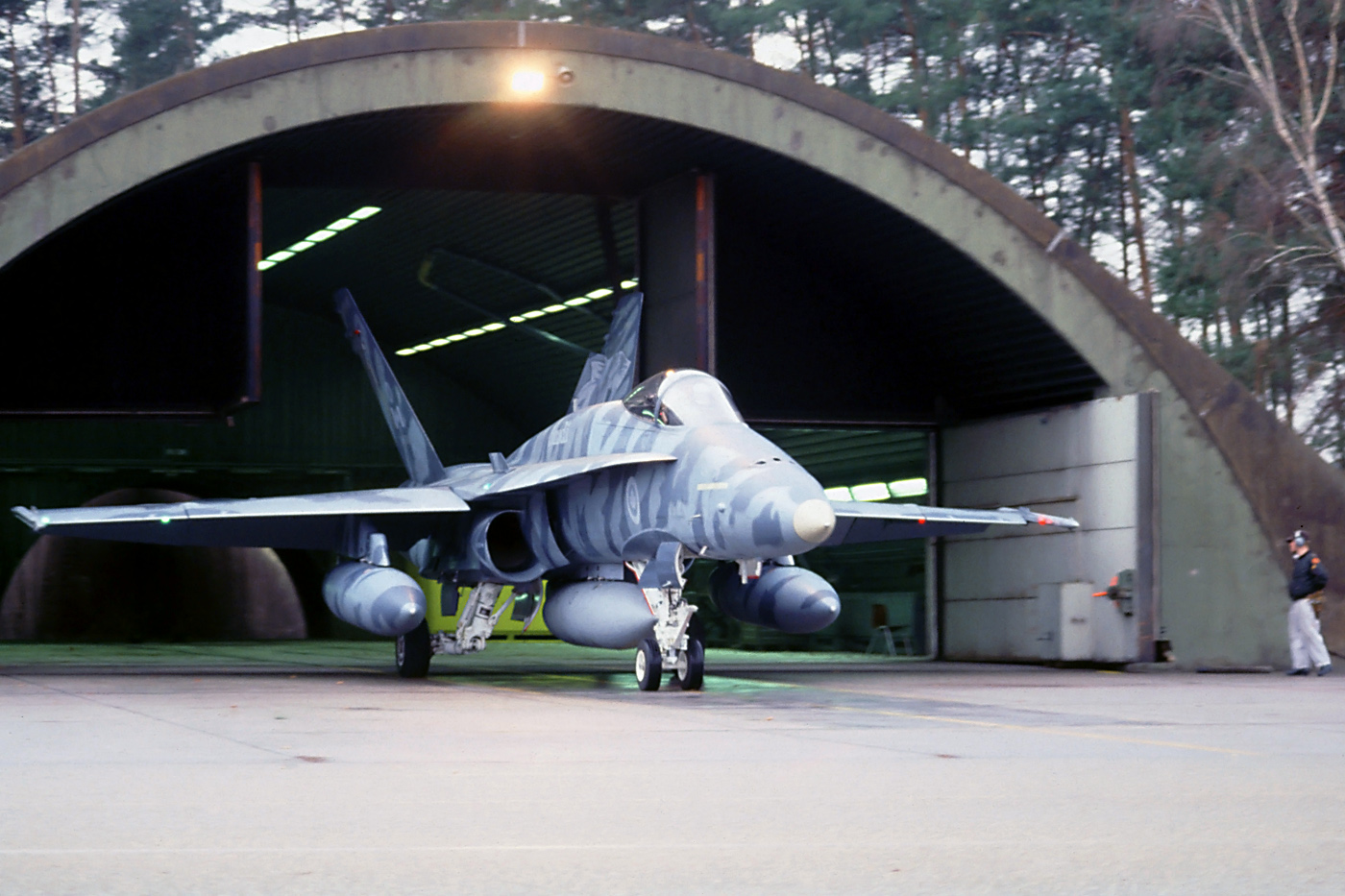
A CF-18A of 439 Squadron taxiing out of its shelter during the departure from Baden–Soellingen

- 1 Canadian Air Division^{note 2} (Canadian Forces), CFB Baden-Söllingen
  - 1 Wing CFB Lahr
    - 416 Tactical Fighter Squadron or 441 Tactical Fighter Squadron from CFB Cold Lake, 18× CF-18
    - 425 Tactical Fighter Squadron or 433 Tactical Fighter Squadron from CFB Bagotville, 18× CF-18
    - 444 Tactical Helicopter Squadron (detached to 4 Canadian Mechanized Brigade Group), (CH136 Kiowa, UH1N)
    - Detachment Lahr, 412 Transport Squadron, 2× CC-142 Dash 8
    - 129 Air Defence Battery (detached from 4 Air Defence Regiment, Royal Regiment of Canadian Artillery, 4× ADATS, 8× 35mm Skyguard)
  - 4 Wing CFB Baden-Söllingen
    - 409 Tactical Fighter Squadron, 18× CF-18
    - 421 Tactical Fighter Squadron, 18× CF-18
    - 439 Tactical Fighter Squadron, 18× CF-18
    - Training Flight, 5× CT-133 Silver Star
    - 128 Air Defence Battery (detached from 4 Air Defence Regiment, Royal Regiment of Canadian Artillery, 4× ADATS, 8× 35mm Skyguard)

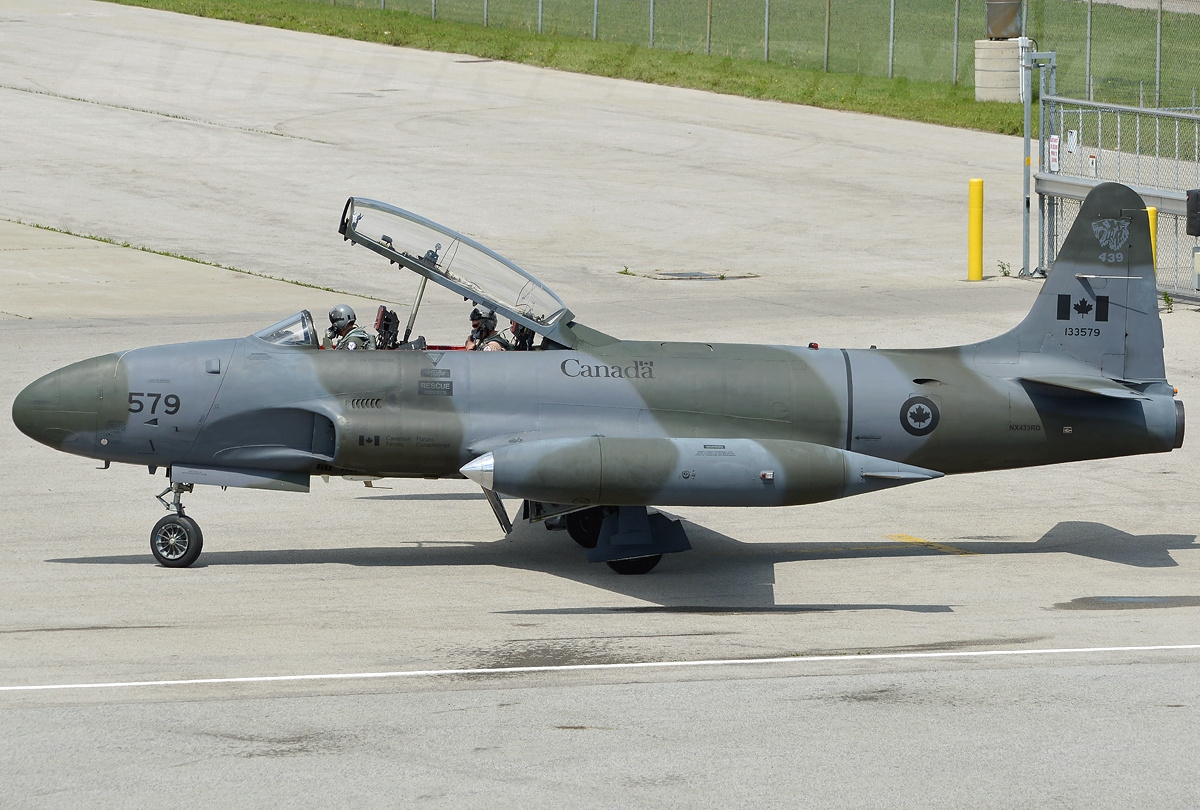
A CT-133 Silver Star.

note 1: Nuclear sharing unit capable of delivering tactical nuclear weapons.
note 2: The Canadian Forces NATO reinforcement units were two Fighter Squadrons rotated from CFB Cold Lake with 416 Tactical Fighter Squadron and 441 Tactical Fighter Squadron, and from CFB Bagotville with 425 Tactical Fighter Squadron and 433 Tactical Fighter Squadron each with 18× CF-18. These forces represented the complete combat-capable assets of Canadian Forces Air Command. The units marked as reinforcements were nominally assigned to the NORAD Canada East and Canada West regions, the plan being that once the two squadrons were deployed to NATO there would be two squadrons remaining with NORAD (one squadron in each region).

== See also ==
- Second Allied Tactical Air Force
