= Daniel L. Karbler =

U.S. Army Space and Missile Defense Command commander

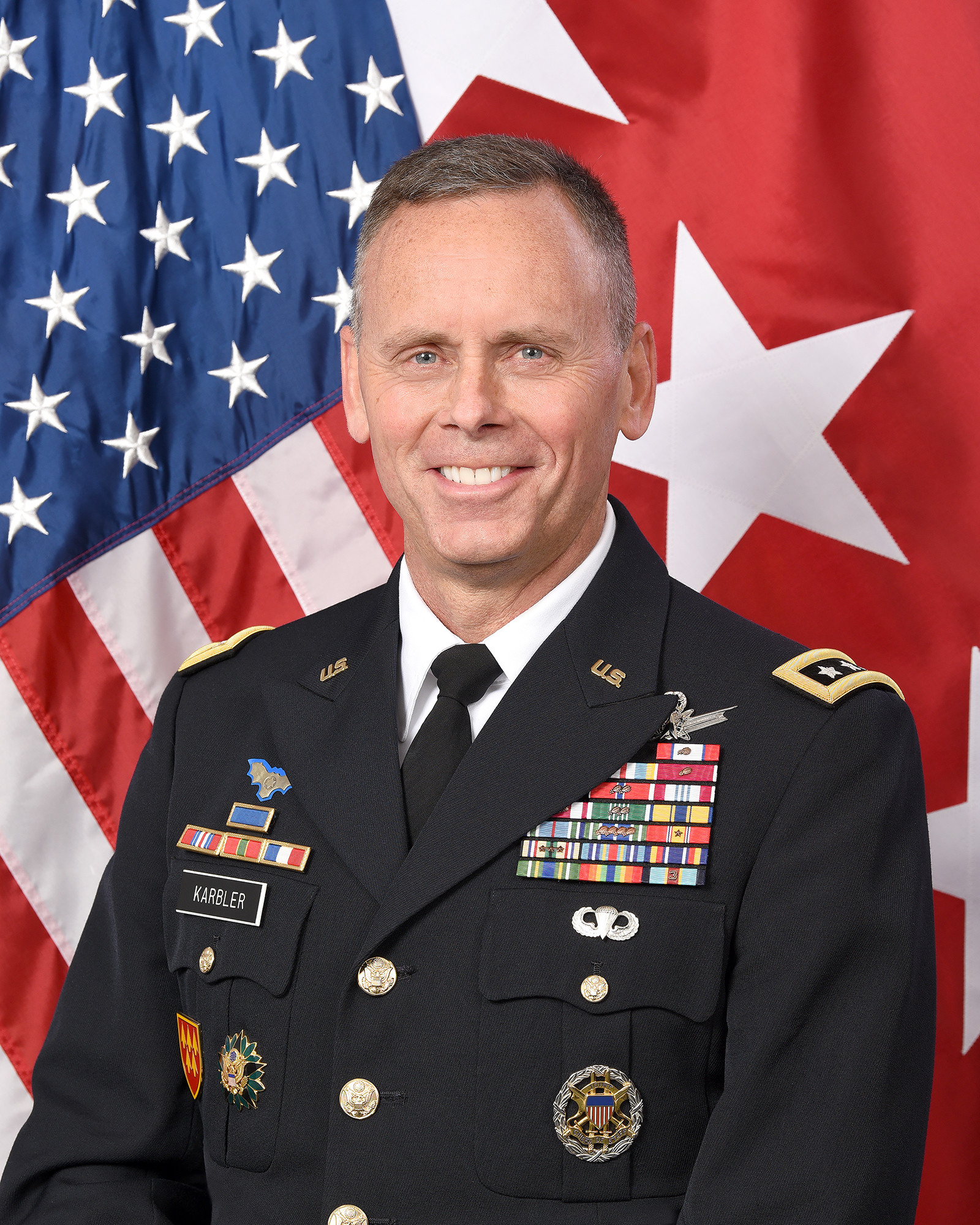
- Born: June 25, 1965 (age 61); Columbus, Ohio
- Education: United States Military Academy (BS); Benedictine College (MBA); National War College (MA)
- Children: Tom and Matt
- Military career
- Allegiance: United States
- Branch: United States Army
- Service years: 1987–2024
- Rank: Lieutenant General
- Commands: United States Army Space and Missile Defense Command; United States Army Test and Evaluation Command; 94th Army Air and Missile Defense Command; 31st Air Defense Artillery Brigade; 3rd Battalion, 43rd Air Defense Artillery Regiment
- Awards: Army Distinguished Service Medal (2); Defense Superior Service Medal; Legion of Merit (2); Bronze Star Medal (3)

Daniel Lewis Karbler is a retired United States Army lieutenant general who last served as the commander of the United States Army Space and Missile Defense Command from 2019 to 2024. Prior to that, he was the chief of staff of the United States Strategic Command.

Karbler received a B.S. degree from the United States Military Academy in 1987. He later earned a Master of Business Arts degree from Benedictine College and an M.A. degree in strategic studies from the Naval War College. Karbler also studied at the Army Command and General Staff College and the National War College.

Military offices
Preceded by James H. Dickinson	Commanding General of the 94th Army Air and Missile Defense Command; 2012–2014	Succeeded by Eric L. Sanchez
Preceded by John A. George	Director of Joint and Integration of the United States Army; 2014–2015	Succeeded by Viet Xuan Luong
Preceded by Peter D. Utley	Commanding General of the United States Army Test and Evaluation Command; 2015–2017	Succeeded by John W. Charlton
Preceded by James H. Dickinson	Chief of Staff of the United States Strategic Command; 2017–2019	Succeeded by Randy S. Taylor
Preceded by James H. Dickinson	Commanding General of the United States Army Space and Missile Defense Command; 2019–2024	Succeeded by Sean A. Gainey
