= John Rossi =

John Rossi may refer to:

- John G. Rossi, United States Army general
- John Charles Felix Rossi, English sculptor
