= 32nd Army Air and Missile Defense Command =

U.S. Army multi-component theater-level air and missile defense organization

- Shoulder sleeve insignia
- Active: 1918 – present
- Country: United States
- Branch: United States Army
- Part of: United States Army Space and Missile Defense Command
- Garrison/HQ: Fort Bliss
- Nickname: Blackjack Command
- Mottos: "Swift and Sure"
- Engagements: World War I; Saint-Mihiel – Meuse-Argonne; World War II; New Guinea – Battle of Leyte Gulf
- Decorations: Superior Unit Award with second Oak Leaf

Commanders
- Current commander: Brig. Gen. John L. Dawber
- Command Chief Warrant Officer: CW5 Noel I. Del Real
- Command Sergeant Major: CSM Richard C. Pyles

Insignia
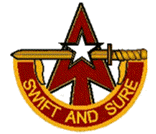
- Distinctive unit insignia

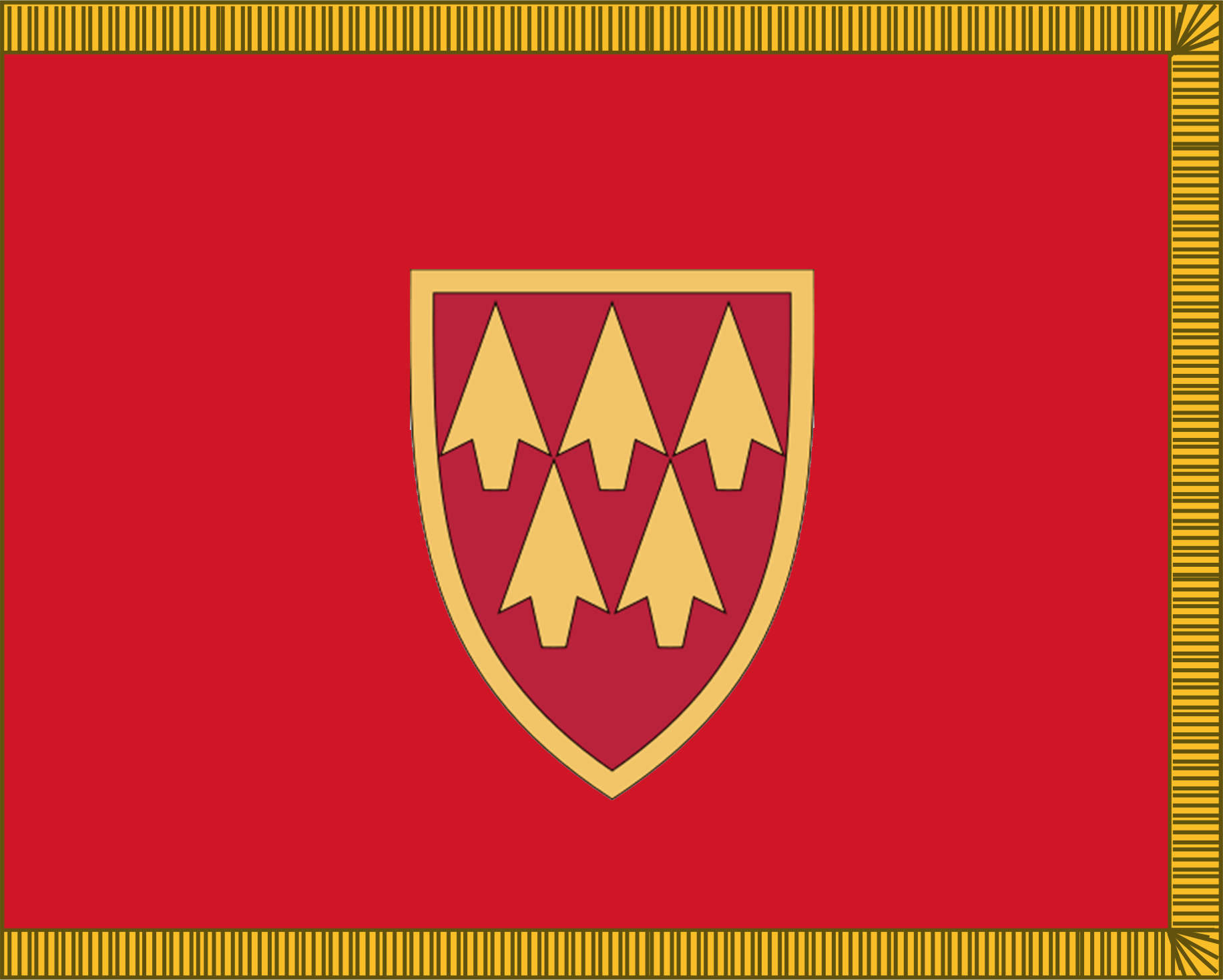
- 32nd Air and Missile Defense Command Flag

The 32nd Army Air and Missile Defense Command (32nd AAMDC) is a theater level Army air and missile defense multi-component organization with a worldwide, 72-hour deployment mission. The 32nd AAMDC commands echelon above corps (EAC) ADA brigades and other assigned forces. Four such brigades, 11th Air Defense Artillery Brigade, 31st Air Defense Artillery Brigade, 69th Air Defense Artillery Brigade, and 108th Air Defense Artillery Brigade; by training, all stand ready to accomplish their mission of air defense against missile attack – 'anywhere, anytime' in support of the war-fighting combatant commander (CCDR). 32nd AAMDC became part of Space and Missile Defense Command, being transferred from Forces Command, in late 2025.

== Mission ==
On order, the 32nd AAMDC rapidly deploys forces to conduct joint and combined/coalition air and missile defense operations for the regional combatant commander.

== Function ==
The 32nd Army Air and Missile Defense Command (32nd AAMDC) is the Army Forces and Joint Forces Land Component Commanders' (ARFOR / JFLCC) organization that performs critical theater air and missile defense planning, integration, coordination, and execution functions. The 32nd AAMDC coordinates and integrates the four operational elements (or pillars) of theater missile defense (TMD): passive defense, active defense, attack operations, and battle management/command, control, communications, computers, and intelligence (BM/C4I) to protect contingency, forward deployed, and reinforcing forces, as well as designated theater strategic assets.

The 32nd AAMDC is based at Fort Bliss, Texas and falls within the authority and under the operational control of United States Army Forces Command. Current Army authorization documents provide for four AAMDC's (three Active Component, and one Reserve Component).

Used for attack operations, standard Army processes are unwieldy and inefficient. A more streamlined method is needed that places Theater Missile Defense (TMD) responsibility under a single executive agent. Commander in chief, USARCENT and CFLCC, has designated a single authority for the conduct of TMD operations in the SWA theater of operations—in this case, the Commander, Air Component Command, and Commanding General, Ninth Air Force. In a break with Army tradition, the Commanding General, CFLCC, gives up operational control of 32d AAMDC when Ninth Air Force is in theater, effectively establishing a single focused authority over theater missile defense on the peninsula.

The theater missile defense operations center functions as a staff under the combined forces air component command and is responsible for planning, coordinating, and integrating theater-level missile operations. The center is split-based with Ninth Air Force in theater and 32nd AAMDC in Ft. Bliss, TX. During either an exercise or in wartime, 32d AAMDC collocates in the JAOC and integrates operations with the Ninth Air Force cell. In addition, it dispatches liaison teams to the separate ADA Brigades. Joint attack operations is an ongoing venture, beginning with intelligence preparation of the battle space conducted jointly between AAMDC and the Ninth Air Force intelligence cell. Information sharing aids the process. Attack strategy is jointly drafted and approved. Pre-planned and immediate attack mission requests are developed. AAMDC brings experience as well as considerable technical capabilities with its intelligence tools such as the generic area limitation environment and all source analysis systems. The in-country analysts bring enormous SWA-specific knowledge and access to quick-response Air Force collection systems. With these resources, joint intelligence identifies the enemy theater missile order of battle, operational patterns and techniques, capabilities and weaknesses, likely operating areas, and other exploitable information.

In 2020 two new batteries were created to operate the Iron Dome anti-rocket materiel. They will be stationed at Fort Bliss. The batteries will be ready for deployment in late 2021.

== History ==
To date, the 32nd AAMDC has proven itself as the premier example of the Total Force concept. Composed of in excess of 220 active duty (FT Bliss) soldiers, more than 10 civil service personnel, and numerous contractors, the 32d AAMDC has performed and validated its TMD mission and conducted extensive training during numerous joint and combined exercises – including Prairie Warrior 96, Ulchi Focus Lens 96, 97 & 98, Roving Sands 96 and 97, Coherent Defense 97, U.S./Russian TMD Exercise (Jan 98), and JTFEX/TMDI (Feb 99).

In early February 98, and prior to its official activation (16 Oct 98), the 32nd AAMDC deployed to support Combined Task Force-Kuwait during Operation Desert Thunder. The 32nd AAMDC performs critical theater-level air and missile defense planning, integration, coordination and execution functions. The unit coordinates and integrates the operational elements of theater missile defense in support of the ground maneuver forces. The unit commanded the Echelon Above Corps ADA brigades, which in this case are TF 1-1 ADA and TF 3–43 ADA. After successfully deploying into Kuwait with little notice, the 32d AAMDC assumed command of one Patriot Task Force, conducted RSOI and assumed command of a second patriot task force, wrote the air and missile defense plan for Operation Desert Thunder and executed the TAMD mission in a contingency theater. Further, the 32d AAMDC played the pivotal role in developing procedures for combined U.S. and Kuwaiti theater air and missile defense, interoperability, and training; expanding the TBM alert and warning architecture within CTF-Kuwait; and conducting distributed interactive simulation (DIS) training while performing its mission in a contingency environment.

While deployed to the Southwest Asia (SWA) theater of operations, the 32nd AAMDC commander also performed the functions of Theater Army Air Defense Coordinator (TAADCOORD) and Deputy Area Air Defense Commander (DAADC) – ensuring that Army Air and Missile Defense was integrated with counterair, active defense operations and planning at the theater level. The 32nd AAMDC provided liaison officers to each of the major theater elements: Air Component Commander (ACC), Land Component Commander (LCC), Battlefield Coordination Detachment (BCD), Joint Special Operations Command Task Force (JSOTF), and Allies to provide coordinated execution of integrated AD and TMD operations.

With the addition of the 32nd AAMDC to the joint coalition task force, soldiers on the ground have access to a new early warning system. This system, which is basically a redundant system relying on digital pagers, can alert soldiers to possible biological and chemical agents before they are released by incoming Scud missiles. Within seconds of a Scud launch, the 32nd AAMDC TOC can predict its trajectory and where a warhead will impact. In less than two minutes, this information will then be relayed to the unit commanders who are at the predicted impact site. These commanders will then pass the word to the troops, giving them time to protect themselves. By monitoring the air picture, the 32nd AAMDC TOC can also pinpoint where a Scud missile has been launched and directing the land-component command to counterattack the site.

In Nov 98, the 32nd AAMDC deployed to Kuwait to conduct contingency planning and coordination in support of CTF-Kuwait during Operation Desert Thunder II/Southern Overwatch. During the period Dec 98 – Jan 99, the unit was again deployed to SWA in support of Operation Desert Fox.

=== Lineage ===
The unit was first constituted in January 1918 in the Regular Army as Headquarters and Headquarters Company, 32nd Artillery Brigade (Coast Artillery Corps) and organized at Key West Barracks, Florida Demobilized 18 January 1919 at Camp Hill, Virginia Reconstituted 18 October 1927 in the Regular Army as Headquarters and Headquarters Battery, 32nd Coast Artillery Brigade Activated 20 November 1942 at Fort Bliss, Texas Redesignated 28 May 1943 as Headquarters and Headquarters Battery, 32d Antiaircraft Artillery Brigade. Inactivated 30 May 1947 in the Philippine Islands. Activated 6 February 1951 at RAF Mildenhall in England. In June 1957, the Brigade deployed from the UK to Kaiserslautern in Germany. Redesignated 11 March 1958 as Headquarters and Headquarters Battery, 32nd Artillery Brigade.

On 11 May 1966, the unit was redesignated as Headquarters and Headquarters Battery, 32nd Army Air Defense Command (AADCOM). Subordinate to the 32nd AADCOM were the 10th, 69th, 94th, and 108th Artillery Groups, making it the largest air defense unit in the US Army. 32nd AADCOM also had a presence in Germany in the 1960s and 70s, basing its headquarters in Kaiserslautern (K-Town) until 1976, and thereafter at Darmstadt. The first Nike Hercules Battery in Germany was located in Kaiserslautern This battery also had the distinction of the first dual site (Nike Hercules and Nike Ajax) This battery was later moved to Hontheim, Germany. There were also HAWK missile batteries in Schweinfurt, Germany. The battalion headquarters was in Baumholder (Birkenfeld, Rhineland-Palatinate). They were supplied by the Spangdahlem Air Force Base (Bitburg-Prüm, Rhineland-Palatinate).

After overcoming some reliability problems, the Patriot was issued in 1985 to units of the 32nd AAMDC, a major subordinate command of U.S. Army, Europe. At this point, the Patriot was capable only of shooting down aircraft, including helicopters. A major effort to improve the capabilities of the Patriot system was already under way. Two Patriot batteries from the 32nd Army Air Defense Command's 10th Air Defense Artillery Brigade were designated for airlift to Israel during the Gulf War. All of the American Patriot units that fought in DESERT STORM were drawn from the 11th Brigade and from several similar brigades of U.S. Army, Europe's 32nd Army Air Defense Command. Inactivated 15 July 1995 in Germany.

Formerly a provisional organization assigned to U.S. Army Training and Doctrine Command (TRADOC), the 32nd Army Air and Missile Defense Command (32d AAMDC), Fort Bliss, TX, officially activated as a theater level command on 16 October 1998. It is assigned to Headquarters, United States Army Forces Command (FORSCOM), per FORSCOM Permanent Orders 271-2 dated 28 September 1998. Effective with the activation, 32nd AAMDC assumes "command and control" (C2) of the 11th and the 35th ADA Brigades.

The 32nd AD also tested the Patriot Missile in Crete during "Reforger" a mission that was conducted around 1983–1985 this was essential in making the Patriot system mission capable. Soon after Validation. Patriot was passed off to allies such as Israel, to ward off attacks from neighboring, hostile countries in the Middle east region.

=== Heraldry ===
Nickname: The 32nd AAMDC adopted the nickname "Blackjack" shortly after its activation in 1998. This nickname was originally given to Gen. John J. Pershing. Gen. Pershing was born in Laclede, Missouri on 13 Sept. 1860. He graduated from the U.S. Military Academy in 1886 and served in several Indian wars. In 1895, after leading an all-black unit in a clash with the Cree Indians in Montana, he received the nickname "Black Jack". Gen. Pershing was assigned to Fort Bliss in April 1914, where he served until 1917, when he was appointed to command the American Expeditionary Force in Europe.

Patch: The red and yellow colors of the 32nd AAMDC patch represent the Artillery. The five arrowheads (representing missiles) allude to the air defense mission of the command. Their placement three and two, respectively, refer to the unit's numerical designation.

Insignia: The star is a symbol of achievement, and represents the command. The five points of the star allude to the organization's participation in World War I (Saint-Mihiel and Meuse-Argonne) and World War II (New Guinea and Leyte) as well as the command's Philippine Presidential Unit Citation.

== Organization ==
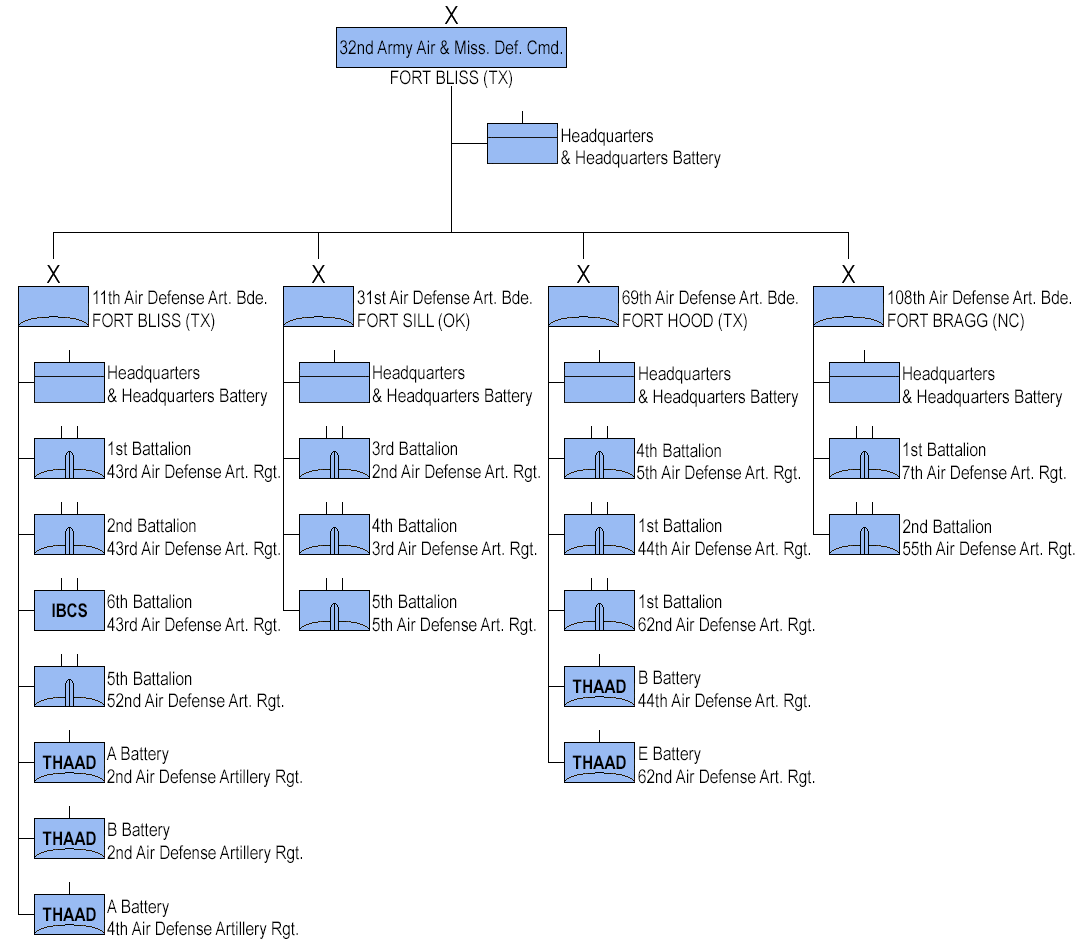
32nd Army Air & Missile Defense Command organization December 2025

- 32nd Army Air And Missile Defense Command (32nd AAMDC), at Fort Bliss (TX)
  - Headquarters and Headquarters Battery (HHB), at Fort Bliss (TX)
  - 11th Air Defense Artillery Brigade (11th ADAB), at Fort Bliss (TX)
  - 31st Air Defense Artillery Brigade (31st ADAB), at Fort Sill (OK)
  - 69th Air Defense Artillery Brigade (69th ADAB), at Fort Hood (TX)
  - 108th Air Defense Artillery Brigade (108th ADAB), at Fort Bragg (NC)

== Decorations ==
Philippine Presidential Unit Citation, streamer embroidered 17 Oct. 1944 – July 1945

Army Superior Unit Award, streamer embroidered 1990–1991

Army Superior Unit Award, streamer embroidered 1993–1994

Meritorious Unit Citation, streamer embroidered 2002–2003

== List of commanders ==
- BG John G. Rossi, March 2011
- BG James H. Dickinson, July 2012
- BG Donald G. Fryc, 21 March 2014
- BG Christopher L. Spillman, 10 June 2016
- BG Clement Coward, November 2018
- BG David F. Stewart, 13 August 2020
- MG Richard A. Harrison, 15 June 2023
- BG John L Dawber, 5 June 2025

== Sources ==
Official Unit Page

Globalsecurity.org Page
