= James H. Dickinson =

U.S. Army general officer

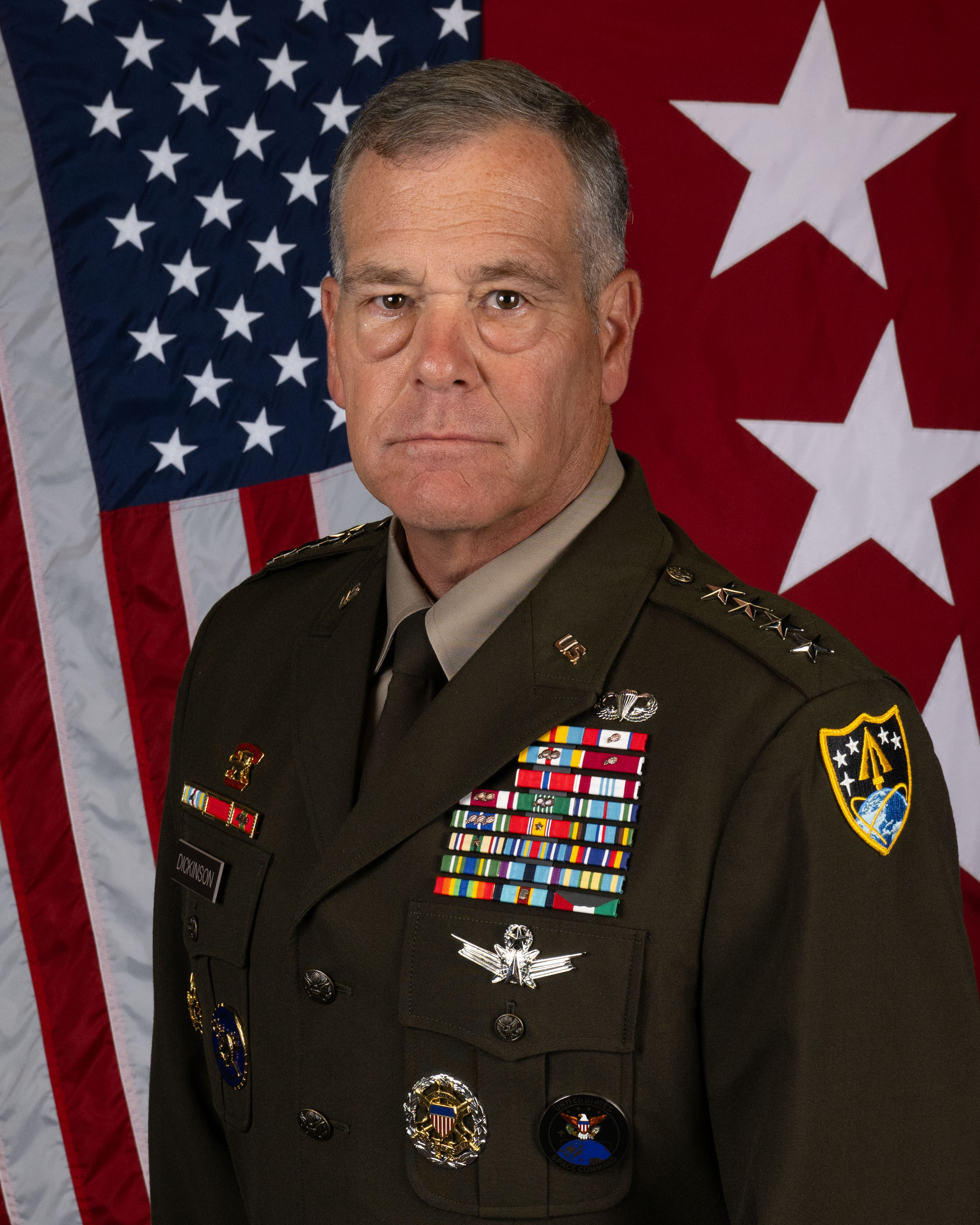
- Official portrait, 2024
- Born: 1962 or 1963 (age 63–64); Estes Park, Colorado, U.S.
- Education: Colorado State University (BS); Colorado School of Mines (MS); United States Army War College (MS)
- Military career
- Allegiance: United States
- Branch: United States Army
- Service years: 1985–2025
- Rank: General
- Commands: United States Space Command; United States Army Space and Missile Defense Command; 32nd Army Air and Missile Defense Command; 94th Army Air and Missile Defense Command; 35th Air Defense Artillery Brigade; 1st Battalion, 7th Air Defense Artillery Regiment
- Conflicts: Gulf War; Operation Enduring Freedom; Iraqi Freedom
- Awards: Defense Distinguished Service Medal (2); Army Distinguished Service Medal (2); Defense Superior Service Medal; Legion of Merit (2)
- James H. Dickinson's voice Dickinson testifies before the Senate Armed Services Committee on the state of U.S. Space Command; Recorded March 9, 2023

Signature
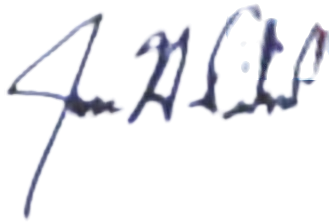

James H. Dickinson (born 1962) is a retired United States Army general who served as the commander of the United States Space Command from 2020 to 2025. He previously served as deputy commander of the United States Space Command from 2019 to 2020.

== Early life and education ==
Dickinson was born in Estes Park, Colorado. In 1985, he graduated from Colorado State University with a B.S. degree in mechanical engineering. According to him, his engineering degree helped shape his life and career by teaching him discipline and follow-through, team building, solving complex problems, and lifelong learning. He also received an M.S. in operations research and systems analysis from the Colorado School of Mines. Additionally, he earned a master's degree in strategic studies from the United States Army War College.

== Military career ==
In 1985, Dickinson was commissioned as a second lieutenant in the United States Army's Air Defense Artillery Branch after completing Colorado State University's Reserve Officers' Training Corps program.

Previous command assignments he held were the Brigade Commander of the 35th Air Defense Artillery Brigade, Commander of the Eighth U.S. Army, Republic of Korea, and Battalion Commander of 1st Battalion, 7th Air Defense Artillery, which deployed to support Operations Enduring Freedom and Iraqi Freedom in the mid-2000s.

From 2010 to 2011, Dickinson served as deputy director for operations at the National Military Command Center. In 2011, he took command of the 94th Army Air and Missile Defense Command (94th AAMDC). At this time, he was promoted to brigadier general. He served as commander of the 94th AAMDC for a year, after which he served as commander of the 32nd Army Air and Missile Defense Command from 2012 to 2014. After that, he served as deputy inspector general of the United States Army for a year. From 2015 to 2016, he was assigned at the Missile Defense Agency, serving as the director of test.

In 2016, Dickinson was assigned as chief of staff of the United States Strategic Command. Following the suicide of Lieutenant General John G. Rossi, who was then confirmed to take command of the United States Army Space and Missile Defense Command (SMDC), Dickinson was selected to take command instead. On January 5, 2017, he took command of the SMDC. In this role, he also served as the commander of the Joint Functional Component Command for Integrated Missile Defense.

=== U.S. Space Command ===
In August 2019, the United States Space Command was reestablished and Dickinson was selected to serve as its first deputy commander. In December 2019, the United States Space Force was established and General John W. Raymond, U.S. Space Command's commander, became its first chief of space operations while retaining command of the combatant command. Dickinson was then nominated and confirmed to replace Raymond as commander of the United States Space Command. On August 20, 2020, he was promoted to general and took command of the U.S. Space Command. On January 10, 2024, Dickinson relinquished command to General Stephen Whiting. After this command tour, he retired from the U.S. Army.

== Awards and decorations ==
Dickinson is the recipient of the following awards:

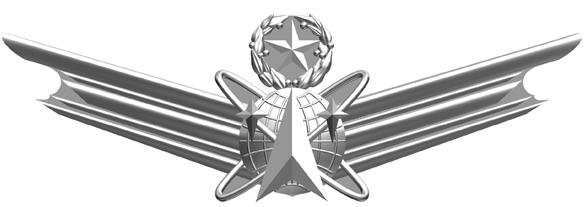
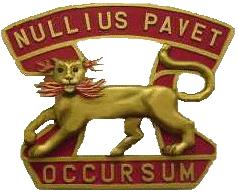
Master Space Badge
Basic Parachutist Badge
United States Space Command Badge
Joint Chiefs of Staff Identification Badge
Army Staff Identification Badge
32nd Army Air and Missile Defense Command Combat Service Identification Badge
7th Air Defense Artillery Regiment Distinctive Unit Insignia
5 Overseas Service Bars

Defense Distinguished Service Medal with one bronze oak leaf cluster
Army Distinguished Service Medal with one bronze oak leaf cluster
Defense Superior Service Medal with two oak leaf clusters
Legion of Merit with oak leaf cluster
Bronze Star Medal
Defense Meritorious Service Medal
Meritorious Service Medal with two oak leaf clusters
Army Commendation Medal with two oak leaf clusters
Joint Service Achievement Medal
Army Achievement Medal with three oak leaf clusters
Joint Meritorious Unit Award with three oak leaf clusters
Meritorious Unit Commendation
Superior Unit Award with three oak leaf clusters
National Defense Service Medal with one bronze service star
Armed Forces Expeditionary Medal
Southwest Asia Service Medal with service star
Global War on Terrorism Expeditionary Medal
Global War on Terrorism Service Medal
Korea Defense Service Medal
Humanitarian Service Medal
Military Outstanding Volunteer Service Medal
Army Service Ribbon
Army Overseas Service Ribbon with bronze award numeral 2
Kuwait Liberation Medal (Kuwait)

== Dates of promotion ==
Rank	Date
Brigadier general	November 2, 2011
Major general	July 2, 2014
Lieutenant general	January 5, 2017
General	August 20, 2020

Military offices
Preceded by Jeffery Underhill	Commanding General of the 94th Army Air and Missile Defense Command; 2011–2012	Succeeded by Daniel L. Karbler
Preceded by John G. Rossi	Commanding General of the 32nd Army Air and Missile Defense Command; 2012–2014	Succeeded by Donald Fryc
Preceded by David Mann	Commander of the United States Army Space and Missile Defense Command; 2017–2019	Succeeded by Daniel L. Karbler
New office	Deputy Commander of the United States Space Command; 2019–2020	Succeeded by John E. Shaw
Preceded by John W. Raymond	Commander of the United States Space Command; 2020–2024	Succeeded by Stephen N. Whiting
