= Echelon above corps =

Echelons above corps (EAC), in US and NATO practice, refer to higher headquarters, of purpose-built organization, which involve a greater number of troops than would be in an army corps. They may be standing organizations with a regional responsibility, or may be established for a particular operational purpose. While EAC most commonly refer to ground combat forces, they may refer to joint commands. They may also be administrative headquarters with responsibility for preparing combat forces.

While there were a significant number of EAC in World War II, with increasing power of smaller organizations, it may not be required to have a ground force of the size of:

- Field army-Field Armies are made up of two or more corps plus units under the direct control of the army commander
- Army group-Army Groups are composed of two or more field armies plus units subordinated to the army group commander
- Theater-Theaters are composed of all land, sea, and air forces in a geographic area

Even in World War II, while the Western Allies used these terms, they were not universal. A Soviet army was roughly equivalent to a US or Commonwealth corps, with a front roughly equivalent to an army group. Japanese armies were also equivalent to US or Commonwealth corps, an area army to a western field army, and a general army to a theater.

== Current US concepts of EAC ==
The US Army divides types of troops into combat arms (infantry, armor, artillery, aviation, special forces), combat support (intelligence, communications, engineer, military police) and combat service support (supply, maintenance, medical, transportation, chaplain, finance and administration).

=== Combat support ===
Military police, in the current environment, often are in a combat role. Doctrine is catching up with reality, as in Panama, and most recently in Iraq, with the Raven 42 patrol led by Staff Sergeant Timothy Nein and Sergeant Leigh Ann Hester, where a woman, for the first time, received the Silver Star medal, and qualified for the Combat Action Badge. Raven 42, a unit of the 617th Military Police Company of the Kentucky National Guard, was on a convoy escort mission where combat was reasonable to expect, as opposed to the rear area MP units guarding prisons and POWs.

=== Combat service support ===
Thomas J. Newman, a Quartermaster Corps major in 1993, analyzes the roles of combat service support at EAC. It must be remembered that US Army doctrine was in flux as his monograph was being developed, analyzing the lessons learned from Operation Desert Storm, but the Army not yet gone to the major restructuring into units of action/brigade combat teams and units of employment.

[from the abstract]

Army concepts for supporting operations involving multiple corps were called into question by actions taken during Operations Desert Shield and Desert Storm. Non-doctrinal organizations provided support to U.S. forces deployed on these operations, despite the fact that doctrinally correct organizations existed. The monograph examines existing doctrine for support of multi-corps operations, and also doctrine for Army theater command and control architecture. It then summarizes support operations during the Gulf War Emerging logistics doctrine is then compared with both previous doctrine and with lessons learned in the Gulf. The monograph concludes that existing doctrine for support at echelons above corps requires revision, that-emerging doctrine is on the right track, and that a key requirement will be for the Army to identify a way to test new doctrine in a realistic manner.

== Existence of EAC's between US corps and unified commands ==
Still in use in US forces are Unified Combatant Commands. Multinational Force Iraq (MNF-I) is a level of command comparable to a reinforced field army.
