= John G. Rossi =

Former U.S. Army general (1961–2016)

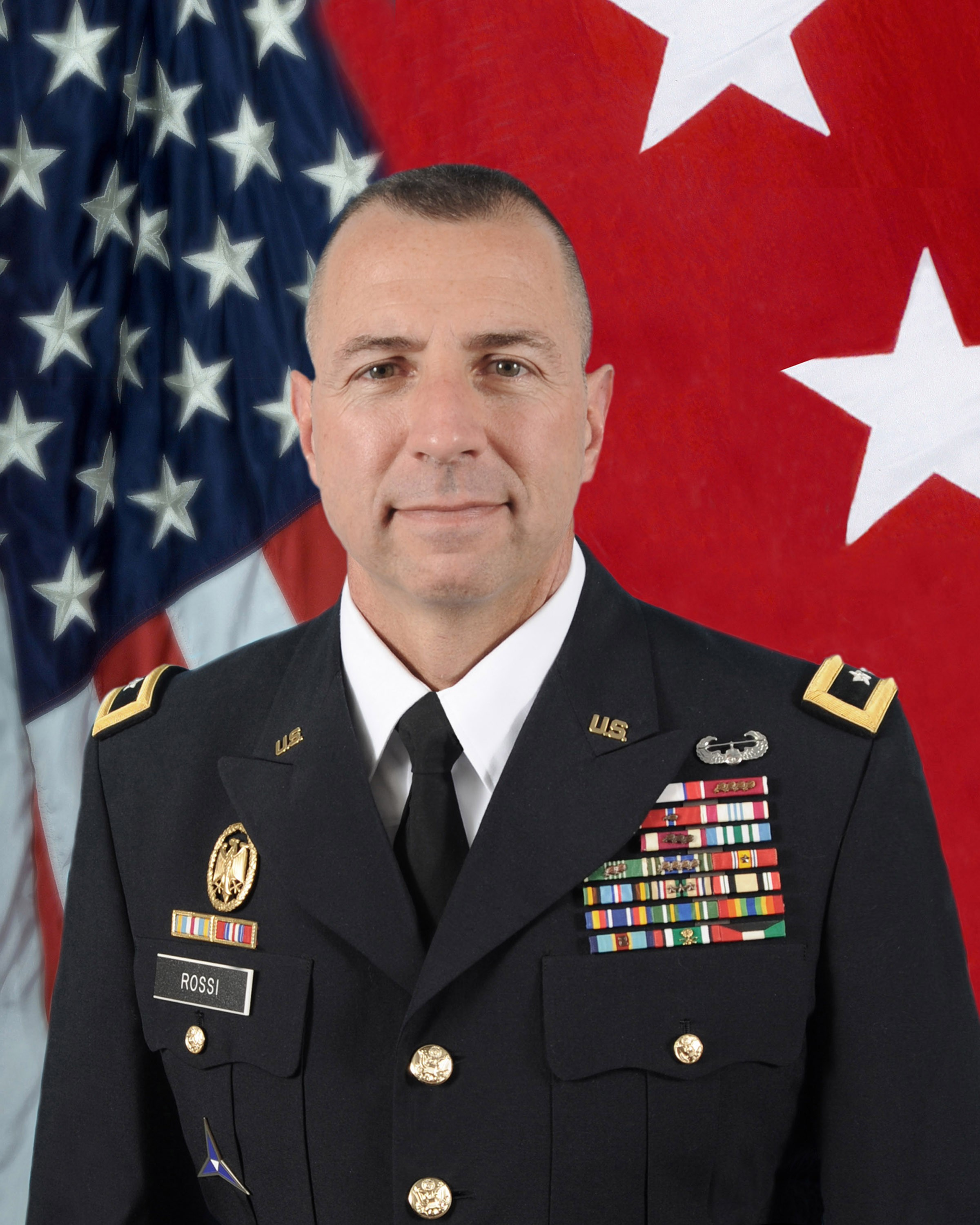
- Born: June 18, 1961; Long Island, New York, U.S.
- Died: July 31, 2016 (aged 55); Redstone Arsenal, Alabama, U.S.
- Burial place: Fort Bliss National Cemetery
- Alma mater: United States Military Academy (BS); Webster University (MA); United States Naval War College (MA); United States Army Command and General Staff College
- Spouse: Liz Rossi (m. 1984–2016)
- Military career
- Allegiance: United States
- Branch: United States Army
- Service years: 1983–2016
- Rank: Major General
- Commands: United States Army Fires Center of Excellence; 32nd Army Air and Missile Defense Command; 35th Air Defense Artillery Brigade
- Conflicts: Gulf War
- Awards: Army Distinguished Service Medal (3); Legion of Merit (4); Bronze Star Medal (2)

John Gregory Rossi (June 18, 1961 – July 31, 2016) was a former United States Army general officer. An air defense artillery officer by profession, he commanded at all levels available in the career path, from battery to center of excellence. A 1983 graduate of the United States Military Academy, Rossi served 33 years in the United States Army. He commanded the United States Army Fires Center of Excellence from June 2014 to July 2016 and the 32nd Army Air and Missile Defense Command from March 2011 to July 2012.

Rossi was found dead after hanging himself in his residence at Redstone Arsenal on July 31, 2016, two days before his scheduled promotion to lieutenant general to succeed David L. Mann as commander of United States Army Space and Missile Defense Command. He was the first American Army general to take his own life since record-keeping of suicides in the armed forces began in 2000.

== Early life and education ==
John Gregory Rossi was born at Long Island, New York, on June 18, 1961, to Robert Rossi, a New York City police officer and his wife Marie. He attended the United States Military Academy where he earned a B.S. degree, and also earned an M.A. degree from Webster University and an M.A. degree from the U.S. Naval War College. Rossi is also a distinguished graduate of the United States Army Command and General Staff College.

== Military career ==
After graduating from West Point, Rossi was commissioned as a second lieutenant in May 1983, being confirmed to his entry rank by the Senate on May 20, 1983.

His principal staff assignments include serving as operations officer for the 94th Air Defense Artillery Brigade in Germany; chief of the U.S. Central Command Air and Missile Defense Division in Tampa, Florida; operations officer for the 32nd Army Air and Missile Defense Command in Fort Bliss, Texas; deputy commanding general and chief of staff of Fort Bliss, Texas; deputy commanding general (fires and effects), III Corps and Fort Hood; and director of the J33 branch of U.S. Forces - Iraq.

Colonel Rossi assumed command of the 35th Air Defense Artillery Brigade on July 15, 2008, from Colonel Eugene D. Cox. As a brigadier general, Rossi commanded the 32nd Army Air and Missile Defense Command from 2011 to 2012, when he departed to become director of the Army Quadrennial Defense Review in Washington, D.C., from 2012 to 2014, receiving a promotion to major general.

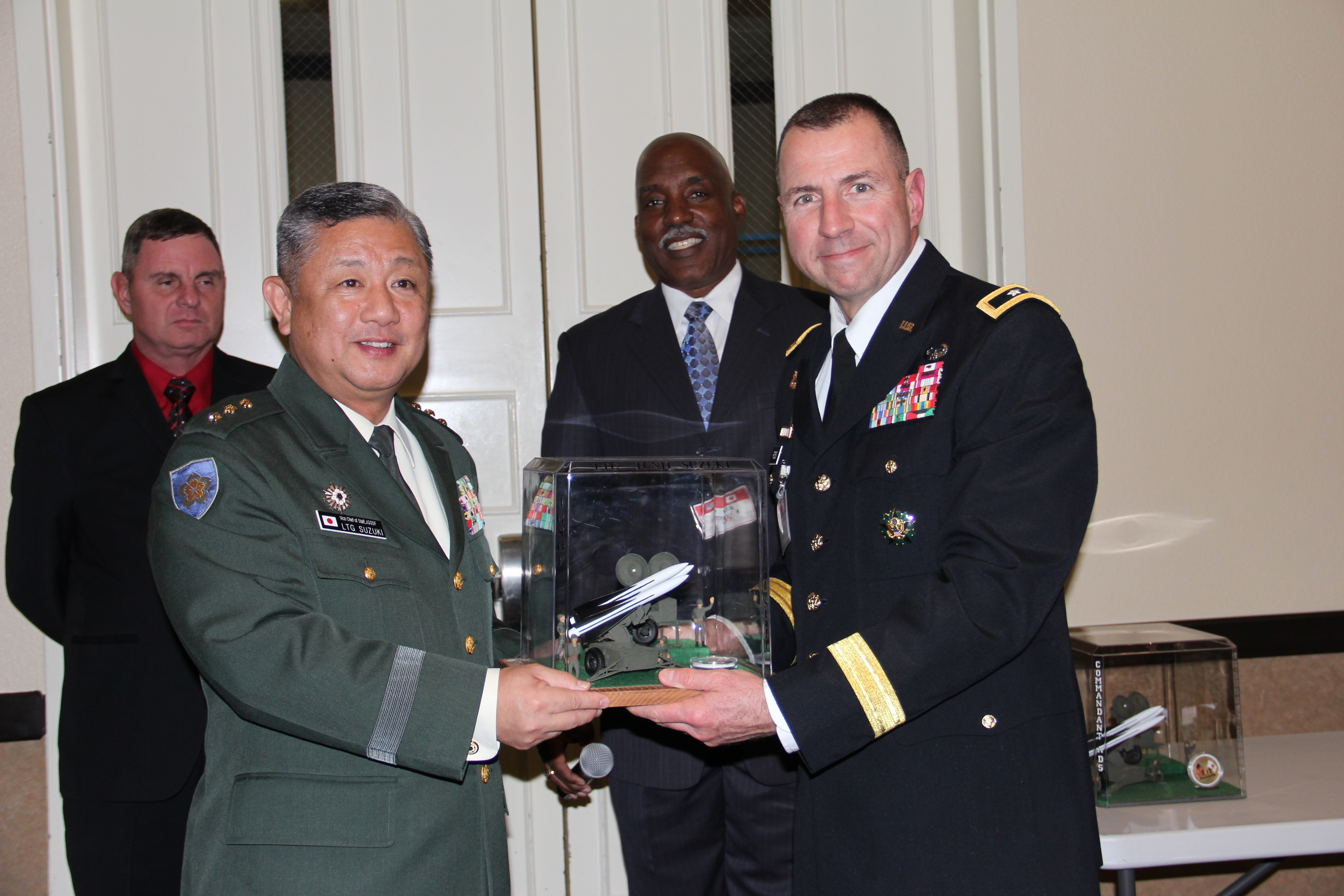
Rossi presents a gift to Lt. Gen. Junji Suzuki, vice chief of staff of the Japanese Ground Self Defense Force (left) during a dinner celebrating the 50th Anniversary of JGSDF Annual Service Practice held at the Centennial Banquet and Conference Center on November 7, 2014.

He assumed his final command of the United States Army Fires Center of Excellence in Fort Sill, Oklahoma, on June 3, 2014 from Major General Mark McDonald, who was to assume command of the United States Army Security Assistance Command in Huntsville, Alabama. As the senior commander of Fort Sill, Rossi was responsible for the military education and readiness of the Army's primary institution for fires, or the tasks and systems that provide collective and coordinated use of Army indirect fires, air and missile defense. He relinquished command of the center to Major General Brian McKiernan on July 21, 2016.

At Fort Sill, Rossi was among those who encouraged attention to the problem of military suicides, saying that commanders to this effect are responsible for soldiers on and off duty.

In early April 2016, Major General Rossi was nominated for promotion to lieutenant general. The nomination was reported to the Senate Armed Services Committee on April 26, 2016 and confirmed on April 28. His assignment to command the United States Army Space and Missile Defense Command was announced in May.

== Personal life ==
Rossi was married to Liz from 1984 until his death in 2016. He is survived by her and three children Maria, Dominic, Angelina, and his grandchildren Kylie, Peyton, Charlotte and Henry. Dominic at the time of his father's funeral was a captain in the U.S. Army.

== Death ==
Rossi died by hanging himself in his home at Redstone Arsenal, Alabama, the home base of his impending three-star command, the U.S. Army Space and Missile Defense Command, which he was slated to take command of in two days. According to the Army Times, Rossi's corpse was discovered by his wife upon returning home.

He was interred at Fort Bliss National Cemetery on August 13, 2016. Several high-ranking military figures in addition to Rossi's family were in attendance, including Dennis L. Via, commanding general of the U.S. Army Materiel Command and Paul K. Hurley, Chief of Chaplains of the United States Army. Individuals who had worked with Rossi over the years paid tribute to their former superior and colleague, including former Fort Sill commander, retired Army general and close friend Lee Baxter, who praised Rossi as an "out front, very polished, professional leader" who "stepped up to be a true leader in the community". The Army also issued an official statement, commending Rossi as "a respected leader, valiant warrior and trusted friend who gave more than 33 years of service to this nation."

With Rossi's death, David L. Mann's term as USASMDC commanding general was extended beyond statutory limits pending confirmation of another candidate as his successor. James H. Dickinson was nominated and confirmed in December 2016 for promotion to lieutenant general, and relieved Mann on January 5, 2017.

=== Investigation ===
The resulting investigation concluded that Rossi's death, ruled a suicide, was caused by feelings of inadequacy for his future three-star assignment, personal feelings of responsibility for the deaths of soldiers under his command, as well as sleep deprivation. Colleagues remarked to Army investigators that "death seemed to follow [Rossi]"; for example with 12 soldiers dying of various during his command of Fort Sill, serving as the spokesperson for III Corps on the Nidal Hasan shooting incident, and driving down the Highway of Death during the Gulf War. Members of Rossi's staff on Fort Sill remarked that the general habitually carried photographs of the aforementioned soldiers in his wallet, four of whom had committed suicide. This constant exposure to and subsequent fixation on death was judged to have desensitized Rossi to the act of taking his own life.

Additionally, Rossi expressed trepidation of his coming assignment to his wife only upon arrival at Redstone Arsenal, days before he was due to assume command. Rossi remarked that "there was 'so much information' associated with the job that he didn't know or understand," fearing he would be "exposed as a fraud" for being unable to handle the diverse responsibilities at USASMDC. Such feelings of being intellectually inferior to the scope of his command were present since his tour as commander of Fort Sill, as according to former subordinates there, Rossi was uncomfortable "with the field artillery aspects of his job" and "spent countless hours" to appear competent and knowledgeable to those under his command.

Rossi's suicide brought public attention to the problem of suicides in the American military, especially because he had been an ardent advocate for action against suicides.

== Awards and decorations ==
In addition to the below awards, the Major General John G. Rossi Military Fellowship offered by the Missile Defense Advocacy Alliance is named after him.

U.S. military decorations
Army Distinguished Service Medal (3 awards)
Legion of Merit (4 awards)
Bronze Star Medal (2 awards)
Defense Meritorious Service Medal
Meritorious Service Medal (3 awards)
Joint Service Commendation Medal
Army Commendation Medal (2 awards)
Army Achievement Medal (4 awards)
U.S. Unit Awards
Joint Meritorious Unit Commendation
Valorous Unit Award
U.S. Service (Campaign) Medals and Service and Training Ribbons
National Defense Service Medal (with 1 service star)
Armed Forces Expeditionary Medal
Southwest Asia Service Medal (with 3 service stars)
Iraq Campaign Medal
Global War on Terrorism Service Medal
Korea Defense Service Medal
Armed Forces Service Medal
Army Service Ribbon
Army Overseas Service Ribbon (with award numeral "2")
Foreign Medals and Ribbons
Kuwait Liberation Medal (Saudi Arabia)
Kuwait Liberation Medal (Kuwait)

Other accoutrements
Air Assault Badge
III Corps Combat Service Identification Badge
Unidentified DUI

Military offices
Preceded by James M. McDonald	Commanding General of the United States Army Fires Center of Excellence; 2014–2016	Succeeded by Brian J. McKiernan
