= 69th Air Defense Artillery Brigade =

- Shoulder sleeve insignia
- Founded: 2008
- Country: United States
- Branch: United States Army
- Type: Air defense artillery
- Size: Brigade
- Part of: 32nd Army Air & Missile Defense Command
- Garrison/HQ: Fort Hood, Texas
- Motto: "Team of Winners"
- Engagements: World War I World War II -Western Pacific
- Decorations: Meritorious Unit Commendation with streamer PACIFIC THEATER; Superior Unit Award

Insignia
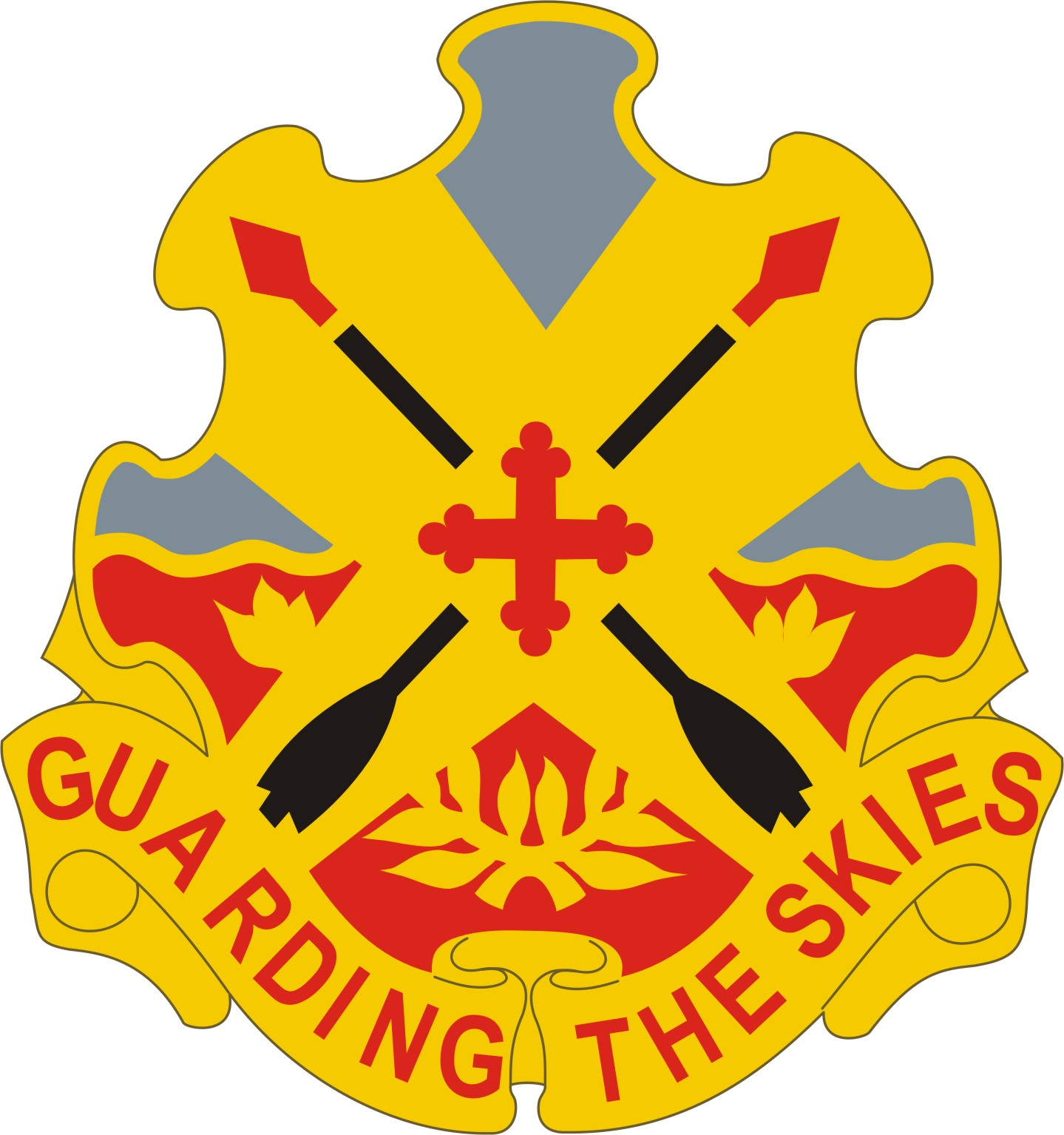
- Distinctive unit insignia

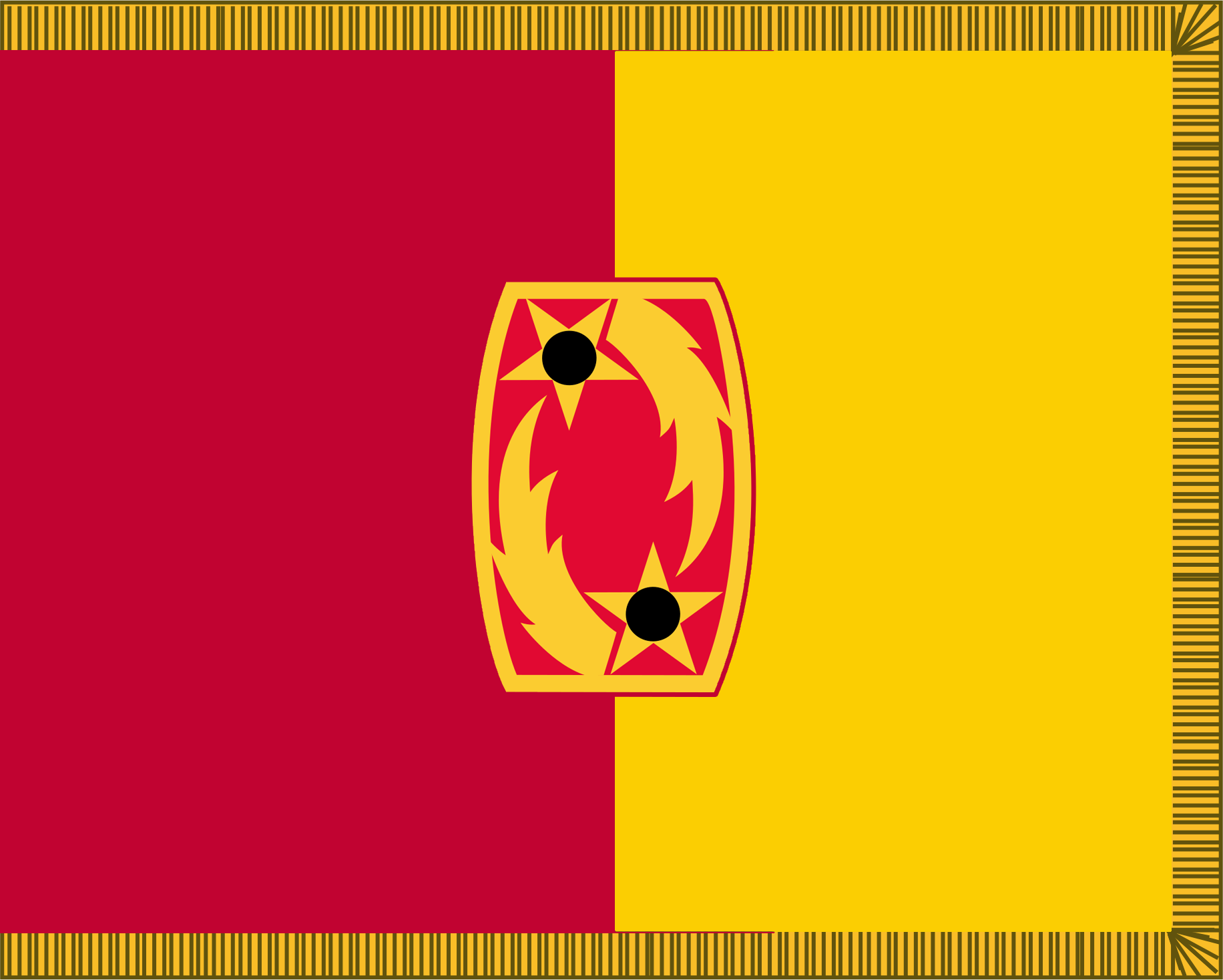
- 69th Air Defense Artillery Brigade Flag

The 69th Air Defense Artillery Brigade (69ADAB) is an air defense artillery brigade of the United States Army, currently stationed at Fort Hood, Texas.

Subordinate units include:

- 4th Battalion, 5th Air Defense Artillery Regiment,
- 1st Battalion, 44th Air Defense Artillery Regiment,
- 1st Battalion, 62nd Air Defense Artillery Regiment.
- B Battery, 62nd Air Defense Artillery Regiment (THAAD)
- E Battery, 62nd Air Defense Artillery Regiment (THAAD)

== History ==
=== World War I ===
The 69 ADAB was organized May 27, 1918, at Fort Worden, Washington as the 69th Artillery (Coast Artillery Corps). In August of that same year the brigade was shipped to England. Most of the brigade including the commanding officer Lt. Colonel Edward W. Turner was taken overseas by the ship USS Jason, and since there wasn’t enough room on the Jason for all the officers, the rest were placed on the SS Demosthenes. By the end of August, the 69th were in England and quickly loaded onto steamers taking the brigade to Le Havre France to a training base. Once in France they were able to link up with the 36th Artillery Brigade which was their commanding brigade and they would join two other brigades the 68th, who were equipped with 6-inch American seacoast guns which were taken from the US fortifications back home, and the other battalion under 36th command was the 63rd Artillery who were equipped with 8-inch British Howitzer. The listing of the guns is important because when the US entered the war, they did so on short notice meaning their artillery brigades mainly used European coast guns making it very rare for artillery brigades to come over with any guns at all. This was the case for the 69th when they arrived they had no guns that were assigned to them. This soon changed as the 69th would receive 5-inch M1897 guns from the US 28 to be specific. They were the only artillery brigade in the entirety of the allied forces to have 5-inch guns. The issue with these guns is there was no ammo for them in Europe and guns are just big pieces of steel if there's nothing to fire out of them. The war ended shortly after they arrived though just 2 months after they got there the treaty was signed and the 69th never saw combat, but had the war continued the 69th and their 5-inch guns would have been a key player in invading Germany and ending the war through force. After the war ended the 69th arrived back home on the USS Mercury in February of 1919, and their 5-inch guns were never shot and shortly declared obsolete by the military. The guns were likely scrapped for the metal, destroying a part of unit history that is now only documented. For their service, the 69th did receive a participation streamer for their time in France. Though their time there was short they are still recognized for their small participation in the war. Shortly after returning home the 69th would be demobilized in May of 1919.

=== World War II ===
During World War II the 69th would be reorganized, the first battalion of the 69th would be redesignated as the 69th Antiaircraft Battalion, 2nd battalion was assigned as 529th Anti Artillery Automatic Weapons Battalion and the 3rd and final battalion was redesignated as the 249th Artillery Searchlight Battalion. This reorganization means that the 69th had no battalions listed under their command during World War II and therefore were designated as a Headquarters and Headquarters Battery, 69th Antiaircraft Artillery Group.

During the war the 69th was sent to the Pacific Theater but little can be found on exactly what their role was during the war. They would stay in the Pacific all the way until June of 1948 when the Brigade was again deactivated on Saipan. For their service in World War II, they received a participation credit for serving in the Pacific. This seems to be a similar credit to the one the Brigade received during their service in World War I.

=== Post War ===
Post World War II the Brigade would be reactivated in July 1955 in Germany but would be deactivated pretty quickly in November 1957, not much is stated on this reactivation. Two years later the unit would then again be reactivated in Germany in 1960 as the 69th Artillery Group. In 1972 the Brigade would be redesignated as HHB, 69th Air Defense Artillery Group. Finally in July 1983, it would be redesignated HHB, 69th Air Defense Artillery Brigade at Giebel Stadt Army Airfield near Wuerzburg, Germany.

=== Desert Storm and Shield ===
In 1989 the 69th with other elements of the 32nd Army Air and Missile Defense Command deployed about a thousand soldiers into southwest Asia this was in support of operation Desert Storm as well as Desert Shield. They were placed as a high and medium altitude defense for the VII Army Corps; they had 4 patriot firing batteries and 2 Hawks. These Patriots and Hawks were used to cover the VII during a flanking maneuver in Iraq. This led to the VII swiftly defeating the vaunted Republic Guard. At the end of the operation the task force was sent forward in the battlefield; they were sent to cover any aircraft or ballistic missiles that could be sent at the troops. However, when they were finished there the brigade was not given any participation credit for the operation. In 1998 the Brigade was deployed to Israel this was part of an operation called Shining Presence and involved both the US forces and Israeli forces. This deployment was different in that after the conclusion of the joint exercise the US forces remained to help protect the Israelis from air threats.

=== Global War on Terror ===
Elements of the 69th Brigade deployed to various location around the Gulf in support of Coalition Operations. [This section needs expansion)

== 69th Now ==
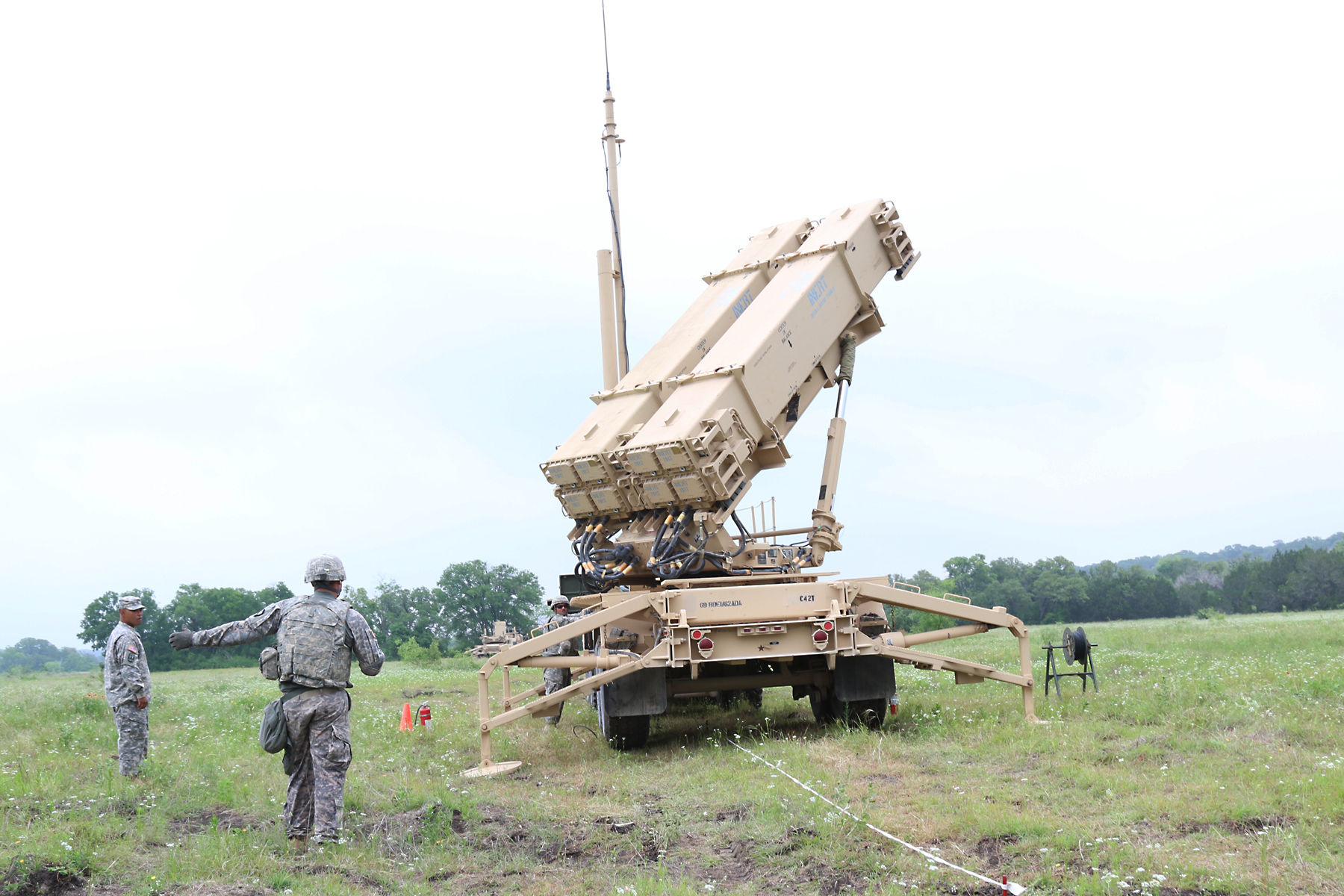
69th members doing gunnery certification

Since being in Fort Cavazos (now known as Fort Hood again), 69th has deployed numerous times across multiple combatant commands areas of responsibility. Some of the more recent deployments have seen parts of the 69th deployed to the USCENTCOM area of responsibility. Air defense artillery deploys multiple organizations in the United States Army and serves vital roles in protecting Department of Defense and allied personnel, assets, air space, and installations.

== Battalions of the 69th ==
Each Brigade is made up of about 3 Battalions and that is the case for the 69th. The 3 battalions that make up the 69th are 4-5 Air Defense Artillery, 1-44 Air Defense Artillery and 1-62 Air Defense Artillery. 4-5 ADA was assigned to 69th in 2008 but was initially created back in 1861 fighting in the civil war and was credited with fighting in both world wars as well as a deployment to Korea during the Korean War. 1-44 ADA was created in 1899 and joined the 69th in 2008. They served in both world wars. In WW2 they were designated as the 54th Coast Artillery Regiment and there are many hints and references that this was the only Black American Coast Artillery regiment in World War II. Recently in 2022 1-44 ADA destroyed missiles sent by the Houthi rebels. The last Battalion in 69th is 1-62 ADA which was created in 1798 and joined 69th in 2009. They served in the war of 1812 as well as both world wars, In World War II they would deploy into not only North Africa but also the Italian campaign and then later they would be deployed into Germany. Now every battalion is a part of a division which is made up of a couple brigades; the division that the 69th falls under is the 32nd Army and Air Missile Defense Command the 69th would join the 32nd around 1989.

== Unit Insignia and Shoulder Sleeve Insignia ==
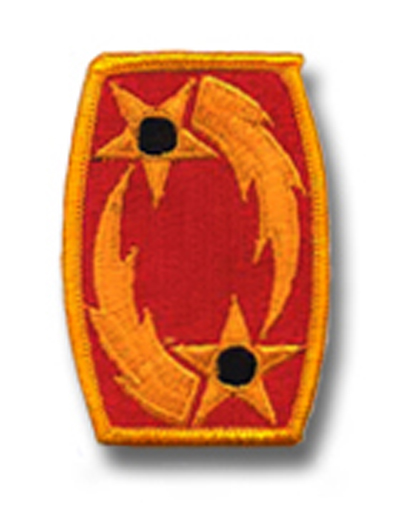
Shoulder patch worn by members of 69th

Each Brigade and even battalion will have a special unit insignia as well as shoulder sleeve insignia that is worn by the soldier's part of the Brigade. The 69th’s unit insignia is red and gold colored these are the colors for artillery for their service in World War I and World War II they have special crossbolt designs going in a x shape. The gold beam represents the unit's origins as a Coastal Artillery Brigade, the red cross is there to represent the direct descendant of the Brigade which was the 1st battalion redesignated during World War II. There is a blue area above the crossbow bolts that represent the ADA’s motto “First to Fire” as well as the mission of the branch. The shoulder insignia is much simpler having to comets with flight trails used to represent the numbers sixty-nine there are to black circles representing cannon balls, and the comets positioning is meant to mimic a defense posture.

== See also ==
- Air Defense Artillery Branch (United States)
- U.S. Army Coast Artillery Corps

== Sources ==
- 69th Air Defense Artillery Brigade :: U.S. Army Fort Cavazos
- army.mil
- 69th Artillery World War I (rootsweb.com)
- 69th Air Defense Artillery Brigade (globalsecurity.org)
