= 108th Air Defense Artillery Brigade =

- Shoulder sleeve insignia
- Active: 1923 – 45; 1956 – 60; 1967 – 71; 1974 – present
- Country: United States
- Branch: United States Army
- Type: Air defense
- Size: Headquarters & 3 Battalions
- Part of: 32nd Army Air & Missile Defense Command; XVIII Airborne Corps
- Garrison/HQ: Fort Bragg
- Nickname: "Spartan" Brigade
- Motto: "Deeds Above Words!"
- Colors: Blue, Red, Gold
- Engagements: World War II; Vietnam War; Iraq War

Commanders
- Current commander: COL King E Cooper Jr

Insignia
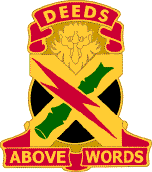
- Distinctive unit insignia

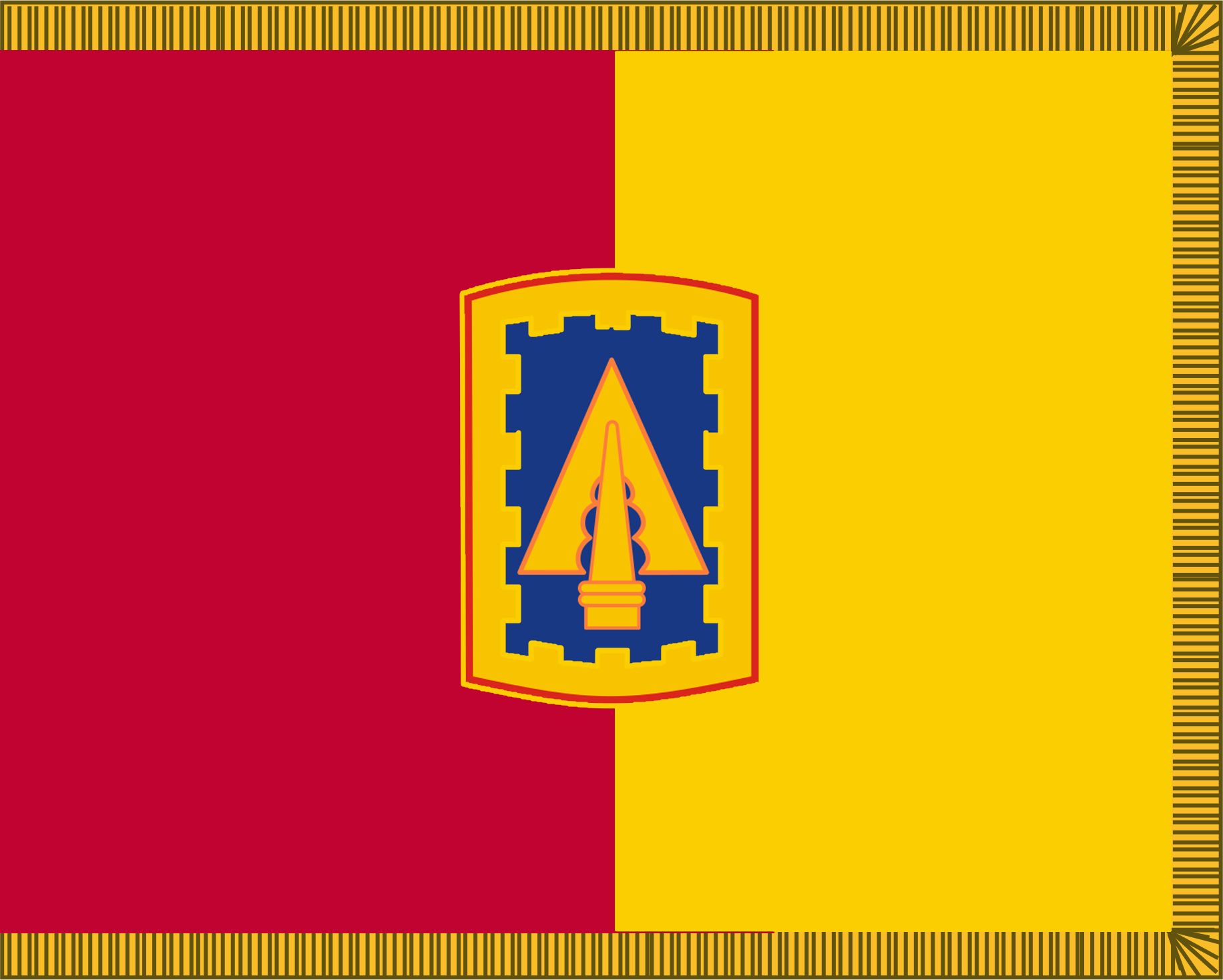
- 108th Air Defense Artillery Brigade Flag

The 108th Air Defense Artillery Brigade is an air defense artillery brigade of the United States Army. The mission of the brigade is to train and maintain a strategic crisis response air defense artillery brigade capable of deploying worldwide, on short notice, to provide air defense force protection from air-breathing threats and tactical ballistic missiles, as well as allow freedom of maneuver for XVIII Airborne Corps operations.

== Subordinate units ==
=== Today ===
- 108th Air Defense Artillery Brigade
  - Headquarters and Headquarters Battery
  - 1st Battalion, 7th Air Defense Artillery Regiment (Fort Bragg, NC).
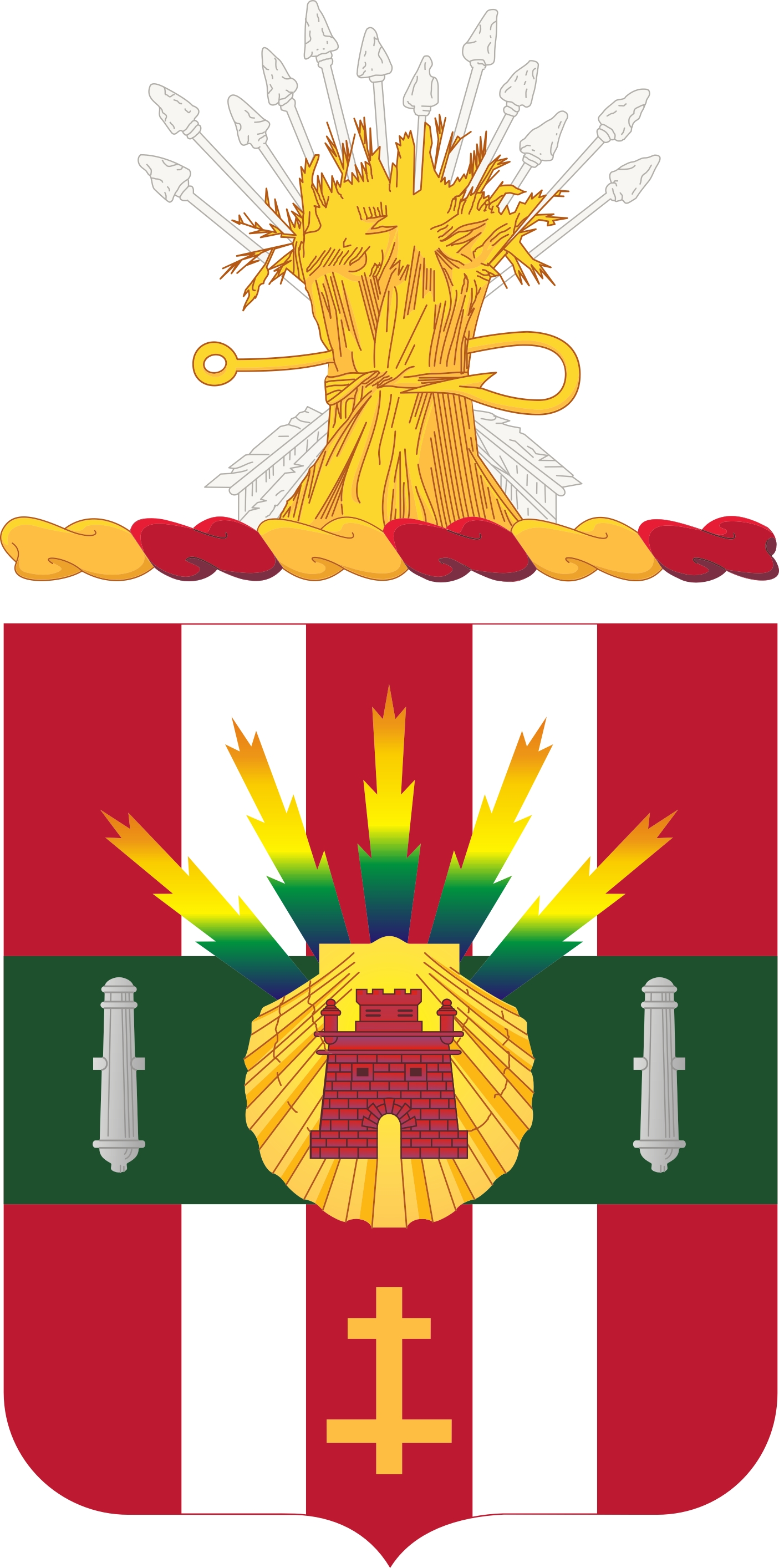
  - 2nd Battalion, 55th Air Defense Artillery Regiment (Air and Missile Defense) (Fort Bragg).

=== Former ===
- 1st Battalion, 2nd Air Defense Artillery Regiment (inactive)
- 3rd Battalion, 4th Air Defense Artillery Regiment (now part of 82nd Airborne Division
- 2nd Battalion, 43rd Air Defense Artillery Regiment (now part of 11th Air Defense Artillery Brigade)
- 2nd Battalion, 44th Air Defense Artillery Regiment (now part of 101st Airborne Division
- 2nd Battalion, 52nd Air Defense Artillery Regiment (HAWK) (formerly the now inactive 3–68th Air Defense Artillery)
- 6th Battalion, 56th Air Defense Artillery Regiment
- 2nd Battalion, 60th Air Defense Artillery Regiment
- 2nd Battalion, 62nd Air Defense Artillery Regiment (HAWK)
- 2nd Battalion, 67th Air Defense Artillery Regiment
- 555th Maintenance Company (part of 2nd Battalion, 43rd Defense Artillery Regiment), now called Maintenance Support Battery)
- 208th Signal Company

== History ==
=== World War II ===
The 108th Air Defense Artillery Brigade traces its lineage to the 514th Coast Artillery Regiment (Antiaircraft), which was formed in Schenectady, New York in October, 1923. The Regiment was reorganized as the 108th Coast Artillery Group (Antiaircraft) on 3 January 1943 at Camp Davis, North Carolina, and again reorganized as the 108th Antiaircraft Artillery Group, in May of the same year. The 108th was then moved to Camp Stewart, Georgia on 14 October 1943. Two months later, the 108th staged at Camp Shanks, New York on 22 December and remained there until they deployed from the New York Port of Embarkation on 6 days later, and arrived in England on 7 January 1944.

The brigade deployed to Europe during World War II, and participated in the landings at Normandy, going ashore at Utah Beach on 28 June 1944. The 108th then went on to provide antiaircraft defense for the city and port of Cherbourg-en-Cotentin, for eleven months, and then moved forward to the cities of Rheims and Rouen. The brigade was moved forward to Germany on 2 May 1945, and was stationed in Kaufhueren on 20 August. The Group was deactivated there on 14 December 1945, and returned to the Army reserve. The personnel and equipment from the brigade were dispersed to the occupation units.

1/514th CAR (AA) became 217th Coast Artillery Battalion on 20 January 1943, and was again redesignated as 217th Anti Aircraft Artillery Battalion on 28 June 1943. The 217th deployed from the Boston Port of Embarkation on 7 April 1944 and arrived in England on 17 April 1944. The 217th moved forward to France on 25 June 1944, where they remained until they moved forward to participate in the Ardennes-Alsace Offensive. The 217th was relocated to Stubenag, Germany on 20 August 1945. The 217th returned to the continental US via the Hampton Roads Port of Embarkation on 2 February 1946, and was deactivated and returned to the US Army Reserve the same day.

2/514th CAR (AA) became 639th Coast Artillery Battalion (Auto Weapons) on 20 January 1943, And was again redesignated as the 639th Anti Aircraft Artillery Battalion (Auto Weapons) on 15 May. The 639th deployed from the New York Port of Embarkation on 29 September 1944, and landed in France on 10 October 1944. The 639th was then relocated to Braunfels, Germany on 20 August 1945. The 639th returned to the continental US via the New York Port of Embarkation on 2 February 1946, and was deactivated at Camp Kilmer, and returned to the US Army Reserve on the same day.

3/514th CAR (AA) became 363rd Coast Artillery Battalion (Search Light) on 20 January 1943, and was redesignated as the 363rd Anti Aircraft Artillery Battalion (Searchlight) on 3 March 1943. The 363rd did not deploy, but remained at Fort Gordon, Georgia until 31 October 1944, whereupon the unit was deactivated and returned to the US Army Reserve, with the personnel and equipment transferred elsewhere as required.

==== Campaign participation credit ====
- Normandy 1944-06-06 – 1944-07-24 108th and 217th only.
- Northern France 1944-07-25 – 1944-09-14 108th and 217th only.
- Rhineland 1944-09-15 – 1945-03-21 108th, 217th, and 639th.
- Ardennes-Alsace 1944-12-16 – 1945-01-25 108th and 639th only.
- Central Europe 1945-03-22 – 1945-05-11 108th, 217th, and 639th.

=== Post-War ===
In September, 1956, the 108th AA Group was reactivated in Los Angeles, California. It was again redesignated as the 108th Artillery Group (Air Defense). The 108th was deactivated in April 1960, in Fort MacArthur, California.

=== Vietnam War ===
In May 1967, the group was reactivated at Fort Riley, Kansas as the 108th Artillery Group and deployed to the Republic of Vietnam in October 1967. The Group headquarters was located at the Dong Ha Combat Base during 1968 (and in 1970). The Group participated in every major operation conducted in the I Corps area of operations and credited with participation in eleven different campaigns while in Vietnam. The Group notably supported the Operation Lam Son 719 raid into Laos during February–March 1971.

For its service it was awarded the Vietnam Cross of Gallantry with Palm. The 108th departed from Vietnam on 22 November 1971 for Fort Lewis, Washington, where the unit was again inactivated.

The 1st Battalion, 83rd Field Artillery Regiment served with the Group.

=== Post-Vietnam ===
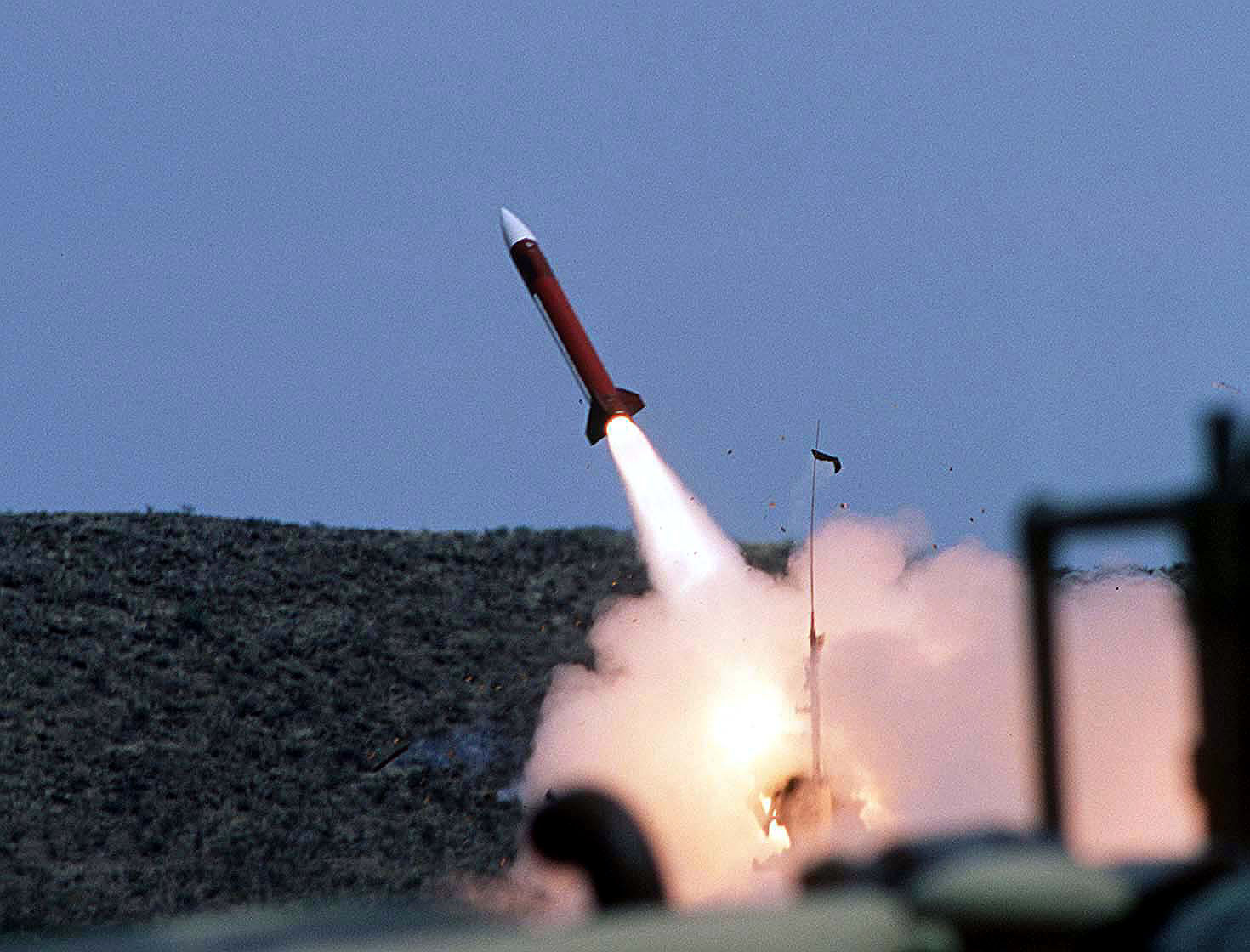
Patriot-missile-launch of the 11th Brigade, 43rd Air Defense Artillery (1997)

On 26 August 1974, the group was again reactivated at Kapaun Barracks, Kaiserslautern, West Germany, as the 108th Air Defense Group, the only Chaparral/Vulcan Group in the US Army. In September 1975 the group moved to Kleber Kaserne and on 1 October 1982 it was redesignated the 108th Air Defense Artillery Brigade. On 15 April 1992 the Brigade was moved to Fort Polk, Louisiana, commanding the Patriot (2–43rd) battalion, an Avenger (1–2nd) unit and the newly activated (16 December 1992) 208th Signal Company. On 15 August 1996 the brigade moved to Fort Bliss, Texas.

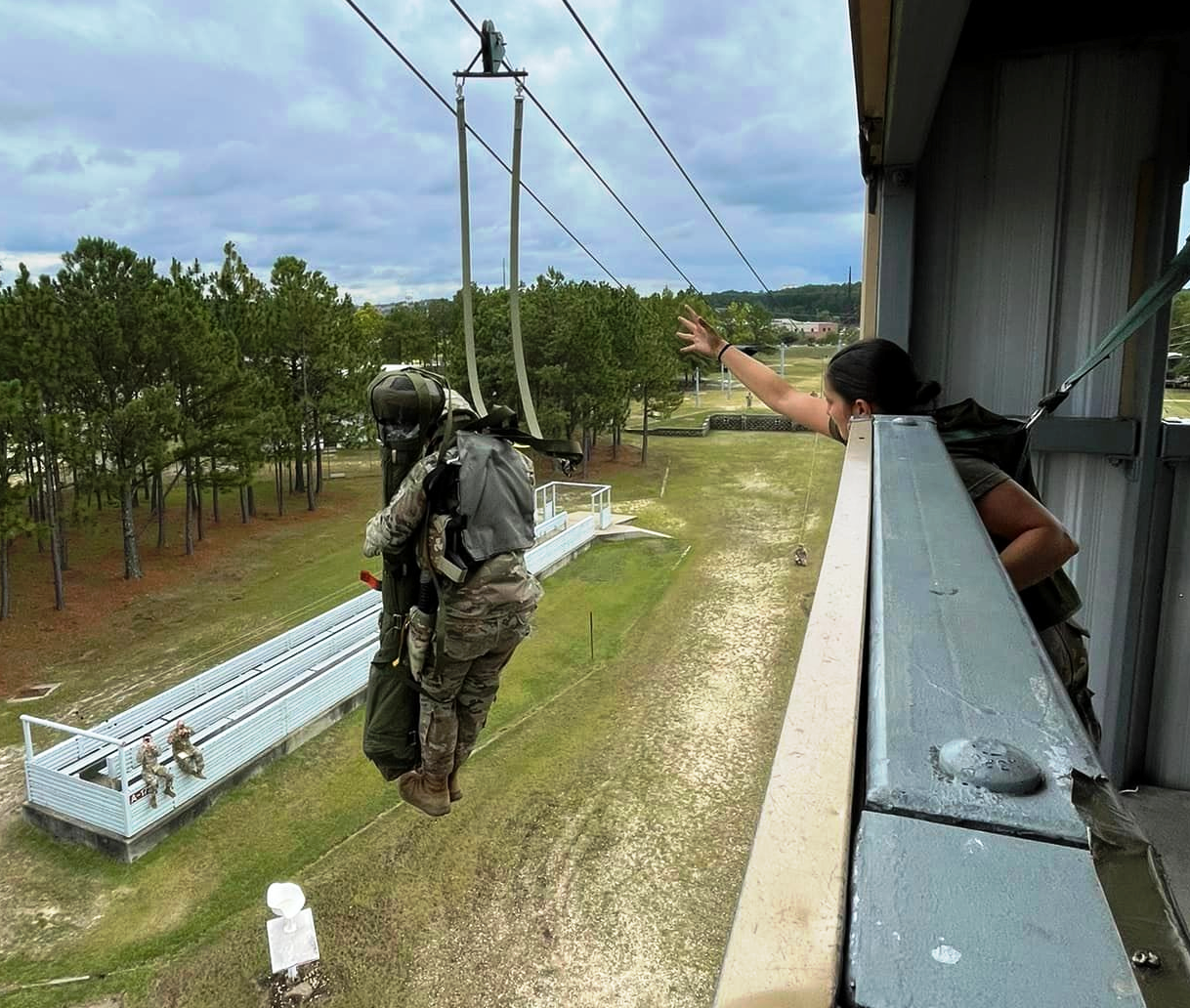
A paratrooper with E Battery, 3rd Battalion, 4th Air Defense Artillery Regiment practices jumping from a 34-foot tower with the FIM-92 Stinger

At Fort Polk the brigade joined the XVIII Airborne Corps which was headquartered at Fort Bragg, NC. It added an Airborne tab above its patch; however, according to the U.S. Army Institute of Heraldry, the alignment with XVIII Airborne Corps does not serve as authorization to add the Airborne tab. While the brigade did wear the tab, it was done without Department of the Army authorization. The IOH also notes the brigade asked to be authorized a beret, flash and parachute wing trimming (aka "oval") but was turned down because the brigade is not an Airborne unit and is not authorized either a flash or wing trimming. The brigade's only unit to serve on jump status was the Stinger Platoon of 2–52 ADA. This platoon, under the command of 1LT Evan Phelps, had the distinction of being the first ADA unit to be deployed in the opening days of the Gulf War. 2–52 ADA was disbanded shortly after the Gulf War in the early 1990s. Later in 2007, the brigade would again have Airborne units assigned to its command with the addition of the 3–4th ADA when it was reassigned from the 82d Airborne Division. Under the ongoing reorganization, only Battery E of 3–4th ADA is on jump status.

In 2007–2008, the unit was to be moved to Fort Bragg as part of the 2005 BRAC realignment. The brigade saw 1–7 ADA deployed to South Korea and gained 3–4 ADA, previously an Avenger battalion. 3–4 ADA is now organized as an "Air and Missile Defense" battalion.
