= 31st Air Defense Artillery Brigade =

- Shoulder sleeve insignia
- Active: 1918–1946, 1960s–1979, 1988–present
- Country: United States
- Branch: United States Army
- Type: Air defense artillery
- Size: Brigade
- Part of: 32nd Army Air & Missile Defense Command
- Garrison/HQ: Fort Sill
- Mottos: "Ready and Vigilant"

Commanders
- Current commander: COL Lourdes Costas

Insignia
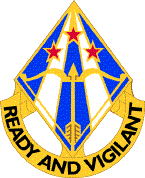
- Distinctive unit insignia

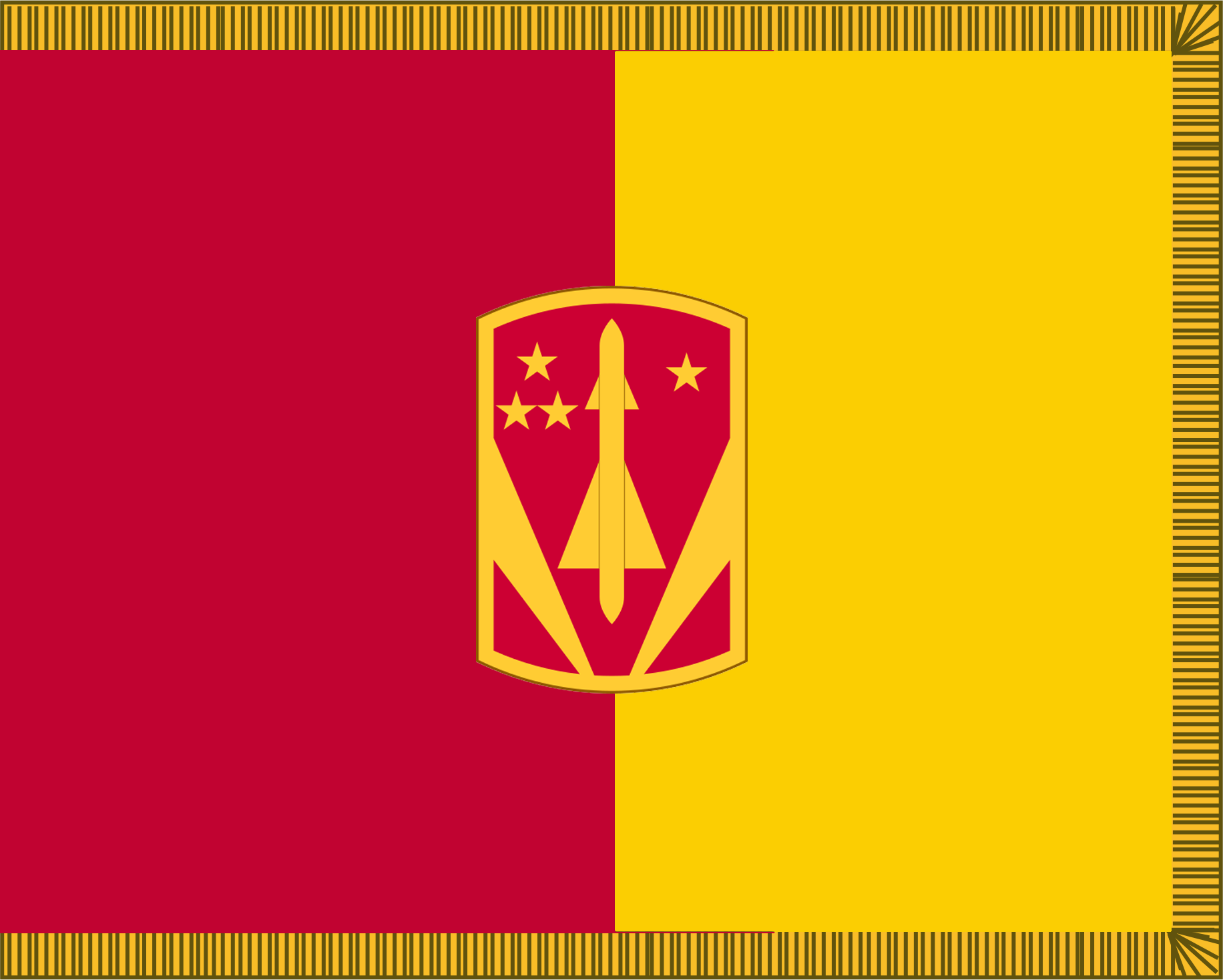
- 31st Air Defense Artillery Brigade Flag

The 31st Air Defense Artillery Brigade is an air defense artillery brigade of the United States Army based at Fort Sill, Oklahoma.

== Organization ==
- 31st Air Defense Artillery Brigade (31st ADAB) (after BRAC & GTA FY11)
  - Headquarters and Headquarters Battery (HHB)
  - 3rd Battalion, 2nd Air Defense Artillery Regiment (3-2nd ADAR) (Patriot)
  - 4th Battalion, 3rd Air Defense Artillery Regiment (4-3rd ADAR) (Patriot)
  - 5th Battalion, 5th Air Defense Artillery Regiment (5-5th ADAR) (Counter Rocket Artillery and Mortar) Counter-RAM system

== History ==
The brigade was constituted on 1 January 1918, during World War I, in the National Army as Headquarters, 31st Heavy Artillery Brigade, Coast Artillery Corps at Key West, Florida. Commanded by Brigadier General George Washington Gatchell, the brigade crossed the Atlantic and then earned four battle streamers for participation in the campaigns Aisne-Marne, Oise-Aisne, Meuse-Argonne, and Champagne 1918.

Tt was demobilized at Fort Lewis, Washington, on 30 June 1921. The brigade was reconstituted 14 October 1936 in the regular Army as Headquarters, 31st Coast Artillery Brigade and was later designated as Headquarters and Headquarters Battery, 31st Coast Artillery Brigade. It included the 55th, 57th, and 59th Coast Artillery Regiments, and, later, the 44th, 907th, 910th, and 917th Coast Artillery Regiments. In November 1942 the brigade was activated as Headquarters and Headquarters Battery, 31st Anti-Aircraft Artillery Brigade as part of the coastal air defense stationed at Camp Haan, Cali. and was later deployed to the European Theater where it participated in and earned three more battle streamers for campaigns in Rome-Arno, Southern France, and the Rhineland. On 30 June 1946, the brigade was deactivated at Laned-Sebold, Germany. This unit would encounter numerous activations and inactivations over the years to come to include a 1946 inactivation in Germany, reactivation in 1948 at Fort Bliss, Tex. and in 1958 was reorganized as Headquarters and Headquarters Battery, 31st Artillery Brigade.

The headquarters was inactivated in 1960 at McChord Air Force Base, Wash. and then reactivated on 15 December 1961 at Lockport Air Force Station, N.Y., as the 31st Artillery Brigade (Air Defense). It assumed the personnel and equipment of the inactivating 2nd Artillery Group (Air Defense). At the time, the brigade appears to have supervised, among others, 1-4 Artillery (AD), and 2nd Battalion 62nd Artillery, plus 2nd Missile Battalion, 209th Artillery, NY ARNG. In response to the Cuban Missile Crisis, the brigade was set up with nine Hercules and Hawk battalions defending southern Florida from attack by Cuba and the Soviet Union. The brigade was designated under its present name on 15 March 1972, and after one final inactivation in 1979 at Homestead Air Force Base in Fla., the brigade would be reactivated again on 1 April 1988, at Fort Hood, Tex. to support III Corps. In February, 1996, the brigade once again received movement orders, this time to Fort Bliss, Tex.

In 2003, Heidi V. Brown took command, becoming the first woman in charge of a brigade in combat.

In June 2008, 3-2 ADA entered the Korean peninsula to conduct operations at Osan AFB, Suwon, Camp Humphries, and Camp Carrol under the temporary command of the 35th Air Defense Artillery Brigade.

The Base Realignment and Closure Commission process meant the brigade moved from Fort Bliss, Tex. to Fort Sill, Okla. in July 2009.

In June 2010, 3-2 ADA deployed again to Bahrain, Qatar, and UAE for an air defense mission to defend assets from Iran, for one year in support of Operation Enduring Freedom and returned its Soldiers home safely in July 2011.

Currently the brigade consists of a Headquarters and Headquarters Battery; 3-2 ADA Battalion (Patriot), 4-3 ADA Battalion (Patriot), and 5-5 ADA Battalion (AMD), Fort Sill, OK. It is also reported that the brigade has responsibility for the 12th Missile Defense Battery at Prince Sultan Air Base, Saudi Arabia, which operates the AN/TPY-2 radar (though 1st Space Brigade is "associated" with 12 MDB).
