= 44th Air Defense Artillery Regiment =

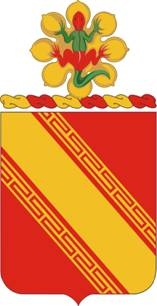
- Coat of arms
- Active: 1918
- Country: USA
- Branch: Army
- Type: Air defense artillery
- Size: 5 batteries
- Home station: Fort Campbell, KY
- Mottos: PER ARDUA (Through Difficulties and beyond)
- Branch color: Scarlet
- March: "Per Ardua (44th Air Defense Artillery March)", music by Arthur Breur, lyrics by Douglass Hemphill
- Mascot: Oozlefinch
- Engagements: Bougainville counterattack, March 1944
- Decorations: Presidential Unit Citation with Two Oak Leaf clusters; Valorous Unit Award; Meritorious Unit Commendation with oak leaf; Air and Space Outstanding Unit Award; Republic of Vietnam Civil Actions Medal First Class

Insignia
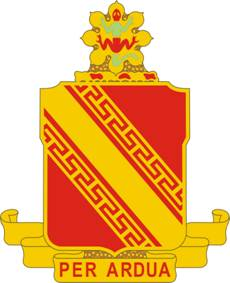
- Distinctive unit insignia

The 44th Air Defense Artillery Regiment is an Air Defense Artillery regiment of the United States Army, first constituted in 1918 in the Regular Army during World War I. During World War II the unit served as the 54th Coast Artillery Regiment

== Lineage ==
=== World War I ===
==== 44th Coast Artillery ====
Organized 26 March 1918 in the Regular Army from existing units in France as the Howitzer Regiment, 30th Brigade, Coast Artillery Corps, initially without weapons. The regiment was one of several US Coast Artillery regiments created to operate heavy field artillery and railway artillery on the Western Front.

Redesignated 7 August 1918 as the 44th Artillery (Coast Artillery Corps) with an authorized strength of 24 British-made 8-inch howitzers; served with the 32nd Brigade and 39th Brigade, including support of the IV Army Corps.

Returned to the US February 1919 and moved to Fort Totten, New York.

Inactivated 31 August 1921 at Camp Jackson, South Carolina.

Redesignated 1 July 1924 as the 44th Coast Artillery (Tractor Drawn), a mobile coast defense unit.

==== 54th Coast Artillery ====
Nine Maine National Guard and four Regular Army Coast Artillery Corps companies of the Coast Defenses of Portland, Maine were used to form the 54th Artillery (Coast Artillery Corps), a regiment that was sent to France and slated to be armed with 24 6-inch guns as heavy field artillery. The regiment was organized in January 1918 in Maine and moved to France in March 1918, stationed at an artillery base, Operations and Training Center No. 6 at Mailly-le-Camp and Haussimont. However, on 2 May 1918 the regiment became a replacement training unit, redesignated as the 54th Artillery Replacement Training Regiment. On 20 September 1918 the regiment was reorganized, with its battalions sent to different locations. The 1st Battalion was posted at Angers (Marne-et-Loire) as a training battalion for replacement men. The 2nd Battalion was stationed at Doulevant-le-Château (Haute Marne) and functioned as a replacement battalion for the tractor-drawn artillery regiments. The 3rd Battalion remained at Haussimont and Angers, France and functioned as the training battalion for the railway artillery regiments. In December 1918, after the Armistice that ended the fighting, the regiment was re-formed. In March 1919 the regiment returned to the United States and was inactivated at Camp Devens, Massachusetts.

=== World War II ===
Redesignated 13 January 1941 as the 54th Coast Artillery Regiment (155 mm gun) (Mobile) (Colored), a mobile coast defense unit. References indicate this was the only African American coast artillery regiment in World War II that was not an antiaircraft unit.

Activated 10 February 1941 at Camp Wallace, Texas with cadre from 76th and 77th Coast Artillery regiments (Antiaircraft) (Colored); moved to Camp Davis, North Carolina 22 May 1941, garrisoned Temporary Harbor Defenses of Wilmington. 1st Battalion moved to Fort Cronkhite, California 28 February 1942. 2nd Battalion garrisoned Fort Macon, NC in the Temporary Harbor Defenses of Beaufort, NC 31 July 1942 until relieved by 3rd Battalion, 2nd Coast Artillery 3 September 1942.

The unit was probably initially armed with 24 155 mm GPF-type guns (eight per battalion), and may have later received the 155 mm gun M1.

1st and 3rd Battalions assigned to the Western Defense Command (WDC) at Fort Cronkhite and Fort Ord, California 22 April 1942. 2nd Battalion deployed to Espiritu Santo 26 October 1942 and Bougainville 7 February 1944 where it saw combat in a field artillery role during the Bougainville counterattack in March. The remainder of regiment remained in California until broken up into battalions as part of an Army-wide reorganization.

Regiment relieved from WDC and broken up 28 February – 5 June 1944 with its elements reorganized and redesignated as follows (units at Fort Ord, CA except 2nd Battalion at Bougainville):

Headquarters and Headquarters Battery on 5 June 1944 as Headquarters and Headquarters Battery, 152nd Coast Artillery Group (155 mm gun) (Colored). 1st Battalion on 5 June 1944 as the 606th Coast Artillery Battalion (Colored). 2d Battalion on 28 February 1944 as the 49th Coast Artillery Battalion (Colored) (deployed to New Guinea 18 March 1945, Philippines 27 August 1945). 3d Battalion on 5 June 1944 as the 607th Coast Artillery Battalion (Colored).

=== Post-World War II lineage ===
After 5 June 1944 the above units underwent changes as follows:

Headquarters and Headquarters Battery, 152nd Coast Artillery Group, disbanded 3 August 1944 at Camp Livingston, Louisiana Reconstituted 28 June 1950 in the Regular Army as Headquarters and Headquarters Battery, 54th Field Artillery Group Activated 17 January 1955 at Fort Bragg, North Carolina Redesignated 21 June 1958 as Headquarters and Headquarters Battery, 54th Artillery Group Inactivated 7 November 1969 in Vietnam

606th Coast Artillery Battalion disbanded 3 August 1944 at Camp Livingston, Louisiana Reconstituted 28 June 1950 in the Regular Army; concurrently consolidated with the 54th Armored Field Artillery Battalion (active) (see ANNEX 1) and consolidated unit designated as the 54th Armored Field Artillery Battalion, an element of the 3d Armored Division Inactivated 1 October 1957 in Germany and relieved from assignment to the 3d Armored Division

49th Coast Artillery Battalion inactivated 20 January 1946 in the Philippine Islands Consolidated 28 June 1950 with the 49th Field Artillery Battalion (active) (see ANNEX 2) and consolidated unit designated as the 49th Field Artillery Battalion, an element of the 7th Infantry Division. Inactivated 1 July 1957 in Korea and relieved from assignment to the 7th Infantry Division

607th Coast Artillery Battalion disbanded 31 July 1944 at Camp Rucker, Alabama Reconstituted 28 June 1950 in the Regular Army; concurrently consolidated with the 44th Field Artillery Battalion (active) (see ANNEX 3) and consolidated unit designated as the 44th Field Artillery Battalion, an element of the 4th Infantry Division.

In 1963, the 6th Missile Battalion, 44th Artillery (HAWK), 38th Artillery Brigade was deployed to South Korea. Headquarters and Headquarters Battery, 54th Artillery Group; 54th Armored Field Artillery Battalion; and the 49th and 44th Field Artillery Battalions consolidated, reorganized, and redesignated 7 November 1969 as the 44th Artillery, a parent regiment under the Combat Arms Regimental System.

Redesignated 1 September 1971 as the 44th Air Defense Artillery.

In the 1973 timeframe, 2nd Battalion, 44th Air Defense Artillery's batteries occupied positions south of Seoul, South Korea.

Withdrawn 16 March 1988 from the Combat Arms Regimental System and reorganized under the United States Army Regimental System. The Battalion was activated at Fort Campbell, KY on 16 March 1988.

The 2nd Battalion, 44th Air Defense Artillery, was for a long period the divisional air defense battalion for the 101st Airborne Division, but now appears to have taken up the C-RAM role.

As of 2018, at least two battalions of the regiment are active:

- 1st Battalion, 44th Air Defense Artillery Regiment - 69th Air Defense Artillery Brigade, Fort Hood, Texas
- 2nd Battalion, 44th Air Defense Artillery Regiment - 108th Air Defense Artillery Brigade, Fort Campbell, Kentucky. The battalion is separated from the other units of the brigade, which are at Fort Bragg, NC.

== History ==
=== Pershing missile ===
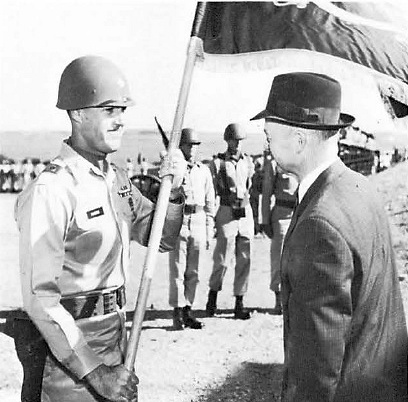
Lt. Col. Patrick W. Powers receives the 2nd/44th's colors from Dr. Finn J. Larsen during an organization ceremony at Ft. Sill, Oklahoma.

The 2nd Missile Battalion, 44th Artillery Regiment was the first Pershing 1 missile battalion in June 1962 under the 1st Field Artillery Missile Brigade at Fort Sill, Oklahoma. Lt. Col. Patrick W. Powers took command on 13 October 1962, receiving the colors from Dr. Finn J. Larsen, assistant secretary of the Army. On 1 September 1971 the 2/44th was deactivated and reformed as the 3rd Battalion, 9th Field Artillery Regiment.

==== Commanders ====
- September 1952: Lt. Col. Patrick William Powers
- 1968-1970: LTC Hal C. Bennett Jr.<my commander>
- Col. James E. Convey

== Distinctive unit insignia ==
- Description

A gold color metal and enamel device 1 1/8 inches (2.9 cm) consisting shield, crest and motto of the coat of arms.

- Symbolism

The shield is red for Artillery with a gold bend from the arms of Lorraine, cottised potenté counterpotenté as in the arms of Champagne. The units of this organization changed designation five times from 1917 to 1918. They were part of the 6th and 7th Provisional Regiment, C.A.C.; part of the 51st and 52nd Artillery, C.A.C.; and were organized as a unit called the Howitzer Regiment, 30th Artillery Brigade, C.A.C.; later designated the 81st Artillery, C.A.C.; and changed to the 44th Artillery, C.A.C. The variegated chameleon alludes to this fact. The double quatrefoil with the chameleon is an anagram of the figures "44" and "81"; the chameleon divides the figures into two fours and the full number of projections with the chameleon gives eight-one.

- Background

The distinctive unit insignia was originally approved for the 44th Coast Artillery Regiment on 1 February 1937. It was redesignated for the 54th Coast Artillery Regiment on 13 March 1941. The insignia was redesignated for the 54th Armored Field Artillery Battalion on 22 July 1954. It was redesignated for the 44th Artillery Regiment on 31 December 1958. Effective 1 September 1971, the insignia was redesignated for the 44th Air Defense Artillery Regiment.

== Coat of arms ==
=== Blazon ===
- Shield

Gules, a bend double cottised potenté counterpotenté Or.

- Crest

On a wreath of the colors Or and Gules, a double quatrefoil Or charged with a chameleon displayed paleways barry of four Gules and Vert. Motto PER ARDUA (Through Adversity).

=== Symbolism ===
- Shield

The shield is red for Artillery with a gold bend from the arms of Lorraine, cottised potenté counterpotenté as in the arms of Champagne.

- Crest

The units of this organization changed designation five times from 1917 to 1918. They were part of the 6th and 7th Provisional Regiment, C.A.C.; part of the 51st and 52nd Artillery, C.A.C.; and were organized as a unit called the Howitzer Regiment, 30th Artillery Brigade, C.A.C.; later designated the 81st Artillery, C.A.C.; and changed to the 44th Artillery, C.A.C. The variegated chameleon alludes to this fact. The double quatrefoil with the chameleon is an anagram of the figures "44" and "81"; the chameleon divides the figures into two fours and the full number of projections with the chameleon gives eight-one.

=== Background ===
The coat of arms was originally approved for the 44th Coast Artillery Regiment on 2 March 1929. It was amended to correct the blazon of the shield on 23 May 1936. It was redesignated for the 54th Coast Artillery Regiment on 11 March 1941. The insignia was redesignated for the 54th Armored Field Artillery Battalion on 22 July 1954. It was redesignated for the 44th Artillery Regiment on 31 December 1958. Effective 1 September 1971, the insignia was redesignated for the 44th Air Defense Artillery Regiment.

== Campaign streamers ==
World War II

- Pacific theater without inscription

Presidential Unit Citation (Army), Streamer embroidered BEACHES OF NORMANDY

- Presidential Unit Citation (Army), Streamer embroidered ST. LO
- Presidential Unit Citation (Navy), Streamer embroidered VIETNAM 1966–1967
- Valorous Unit Award, Streamer embroidered QUANG TRI-THUA THIEN
- Valorous Unit Award, Streamer embroidered IRAQ 2003
- Air Force Outstanding Unit Award, Streamer embroidered KOREA 1978–1980
- Army Superior Unit Award, Streamer embroidered 2007–2008
- Belgian Fourragere 1940
- Cited in the Order of the Day of the Belgian Army for action in Belgium
- Cited in the Order of the Day of the Belgian Army for action in the Ardennes
- Republic of Vietnam Cross of Gallantry with Palm, Streamer embroidered VIETNAM 1971

Battery A additionally entitled to:

Meritorious Unit Commendation (Navy), Streamer embroidered VIETNAM 1968

Army Superior Unit Award, Streamer embroidered 1996–1997

Battery C additionally entitled to:

Meritorious Unit Commendation (2008–2009), Operation Iraqi Freedom

== See also ==
- Seacoast defense in the United States
- United States Army Coast Artillery Corps
