= List of current formations of the United States Army =

This is a list of current formations of the United States Army, which is constantly changing as the Army changes its structure over time. Due to the nature of those changes, specifically the restructuring of brigades into autonomous modular brigades, debate has arisen as to whether brigades are units or formations; for the purposes of this list, brigades are currently excluded. Active status formations are shown in bold.

== Field Armies ==
First United States Army – United States Army Western Hemisphere Command formation at Rock Island Arsenal, Illinois

Third United States Army – United States Army Central command formation headquartered at Shaw AFB

Eighth United States Army – United States Forces Korea command formation at Camp Humphreys, South Korea

== Corps ==
I Corps "America's Corps" at Fort Lewis, Washington

III Armored Corps "Phantom Corps" at Fort Hood, Texas

V Corps "Victory Corps" at Fort Knox, Kentucky

XVIII Airborne Corps "Sky Dragons" at Fort Bragg, North Carolina

== Divisions ==
=== Airborne Divisions ===
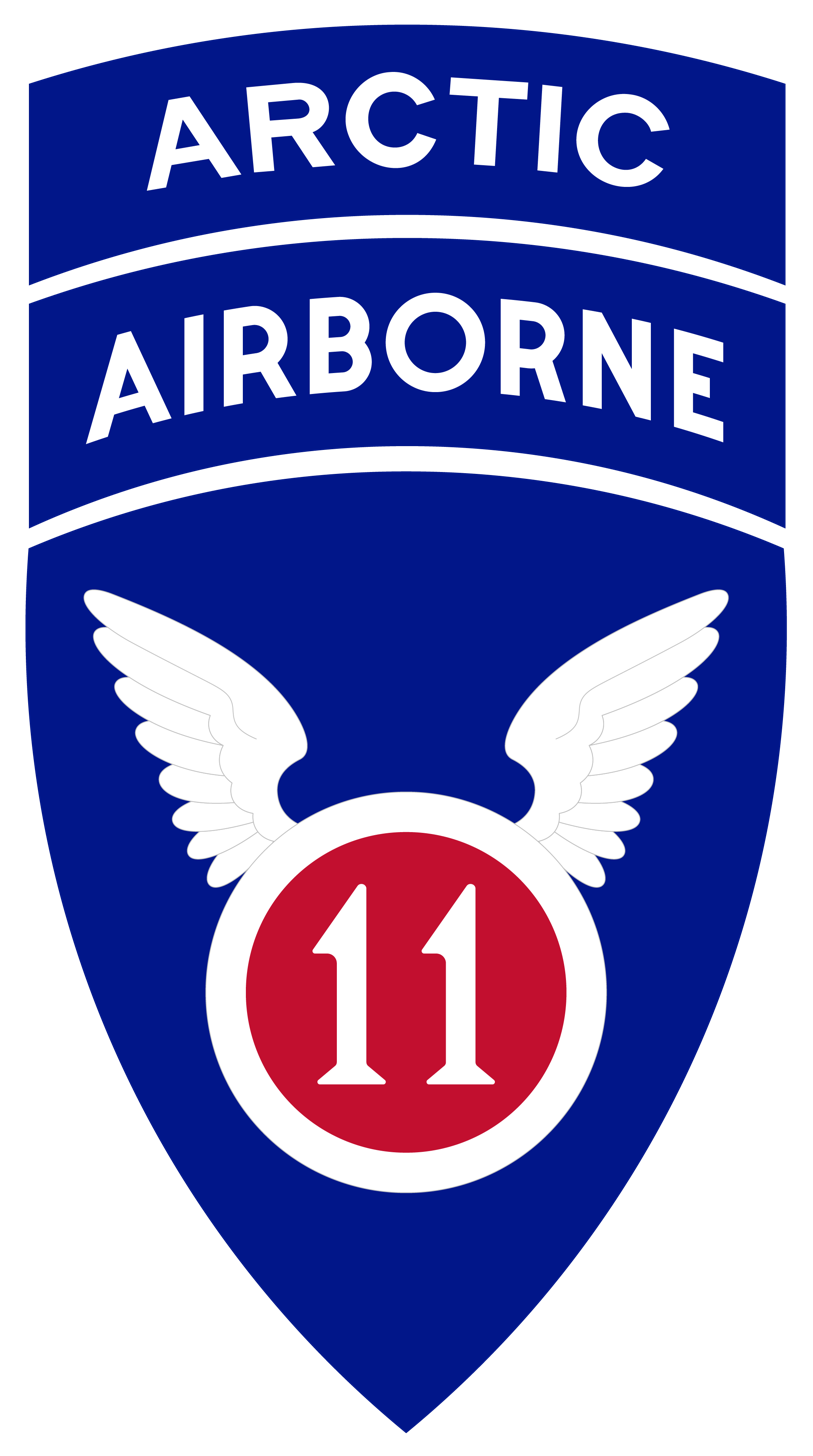
11th Airborne Division "Arctic Angels" at Fort Richardson, Alaska

82nd Airborne Division "All American" at Fort Bragg, North Carolina

101st Airborne Division (Air Assault) "Screaming Eagles" at Fort Campbell, Kentucky

=== Armored Divisions ===
1st Armored Division "Old Ironsides" at Fort Bliss, Texas

1st Cavalry Division "First Team" at Fort Hood, Texas

=== Infantry Divisions ===
1st Infantry Division "The Big Red One" at Fort Riley, Kansas

2nd Infantry Division "Indian Head Division" at Camp Humphreys, South Korea

3rd Infantry Division "Rock of the Marne" at Fort Stewart, Georgia

4th Infantry Division "Ivy Division/Iron Horse" at Fort Carson, Colorado

7th Infantry Division "The Hourglass Division" at Joint Base Lewis-McChord, Washington

10th Mountain Division at Fort Drum, New York

25th Infantry Division "Tropic Lightning" at Schofield Barracks, Hawaii

28th Infantry Division (ARNG) "Keystone Division" at Harrisburg, Pennsylvania

29th Infantry Division (ARNG) "The Blue and Gray" at Fort Belvoir, Virginia

34th Infantry Division (ARNG) "Red Bull Division" at Rosemount, Minnesota

35th Infantry Division (ARNG) "Santa Fe Division" at Fort Leavenworth, Kansas

36th Infantry Division (ARNG) "Arrowhead Division" at Camp Mabry, Austin, Texas

38th Infantry Division (ARNG) "Cyclone Division" at Indianapolis, Indiana

40th Infantry Division (ARNG) "Sunburst Division" at Los Alamitos, California

42nd Infantry Division (ARNG) "Rainbow Division" at Troy, New York

=== Training Divisions ===
78th Training Division (Operations) (USAR) "Fort Dix, New Jersey

86th Training Division (Decisive Action) (USAR) "Blackhawk Division" at Fort McCoy, Wisconsin

87th Training Division (USAR) "Golden Acorn" at Birmingham, AL

91st Division (Operations) (USAR) "Wild West Division" at Fort Hunter Liggett, California

94th Division (Force Sustainment) (USAR) at Fort Lee, Virginia

95th Division (Institutional Training) (USAR) "Victory Division" at Fort Sill, Oklahoma

98th Training Division (Initial Entry Training) (USAR) "Iroquois" at Fort Benning, Georgia

100th Division (Institutional Training) (USAR) "Century Division" at Fort Knox, Kentucky

102nd Division (Maneuver Support) (USAR) "Ozark" at Fort Leonard Wood, Missouri

104th Division (Leader Training) (USAR) "Timberwolf Division" at Joint Base Lewis–McChord, Washington

=== Readiness Divisions ===
88th Readiness Division "Blue Devils" (USAR) at Fort Snelling, Minnesota

- **63rd Readiness Division** (Mountain View, CA): Covers the Southwest and South-Central US.
- **81st Readiness Division** (Fort Jackson, SC): Covers the Southeast and Puerto Rico.
- **88th Readiness Division** (Fort Snelling, MN): Covers the Midwest, Northwest, and Mountain states.
- **99th Readiness Division** (Joint Base McGuire-Dix-Lakehurst, NJ): Covers the Northeast and Mid-Atlantic. [1, 2]

== Independent brigades and groups ==
=== Airborne Brigades ===
173rd Airborne Brigade Combat Team "Sky Soldiers" at Vicenza, Italy

=== Air Defense Artillery Brigades ===
11th Air Defense Artillery Brigade "Imperial Brigade" at Fort Bliss, Texas

31st Air Defense Artillery Brigade "Archer Brigade" at Fort Sill, Oklahoma

35th Air Defense Artillery Brigade "Dragon Brigade" at Osan Air Base, South Korea

38th Air Defense Artillery Brigade "Pacific Guardian Brigade" at Sagami General Depot, Japan

69th Air Defense Artillery Brigade "Lightning Brigade" at Fort Hood, Texas

100th Missile Defense Brigade (ARNG) at Colorado Springs, Colorado

108th Air Defense Artillery Brigade "Spartan Brigade" at Fort Bragg, North Carolina

164th Air Defense Artillery Brigade (ARNG) at Orlando, Florida

174th Air Defense Artillery Brigade (ARNG) at Columbus, Ohio

678th Air Defense Artillery Brigade (ARNG) at Eastover, South Carolina

=== Armored Brigades ===
5th Armored Brigade (USAR) "Dagger Brigade" at Fort Bliss, Texas

30th Armored Brigade Combat Team (ARNG) "Old Hickory" at Clinton, North Carolina

81st Stryker Brigade Combat Team (ARNG) "Cascade Rifles" at Seattle, Washington

155th Armored Brigade Combat Team (ARNG) "Dixie Thunder" at Tupelo, Mississippi

177th Armored Brigade (USAR) at Camp Shelby, Mississippi

194th Armored Brigade at Fort Benning, Georgia

=== Aviation Brigades ===
1st Aviation Brigade at Fort Novosel, Alabama

11th Expeditionary Combat Aviation Brigade (USAR) "We Make The Difference" at Fort Carson, Colorado

12th Combat Aviation Brigade "Wings of Victory" at Katterbach Kaserne, Germany

16th Combat Aviation Brigade "Born In Battle" at Joint Base Lewis-McChord, Washington

29th Combat Aviation Brigade (ARNG) "Lets Go!!" at Edgewood, MD, APG, Maryland

63rd Theater Aviation Brigade (ARNG) "Wings of Thunder" at Frankfort, Kentucky

77th Combat Aviation Brigade (ARNG) at Robinson Maneuver Training Center, Arkansas

110th Aviation Brigade "Warriors" at Fort Novosel, Alabama

128th Aviation Brigade at Fort Eustis, Virginia

166th Aviation Brigade (USAR) at Fort Hood, Texas

185th Aviation Brigade (ARNG) at Tupelo, Mississippi

244th Expeditionary Combat Aviation Brigade (USAR) at Fort Knox, Kentucky

=== Military Intelligence Brigades ===
201st Expeditionary Military Intelligence Brigade "With Courage and Vision" at Joint Base Lewis-McChord, Washington

504th Expeditionary Military Intelligence Brigade "Always Ready" at Fort Hood, Texas

525th Expeditionary Military Intelligence Brigade at Fort Bragg, North Carolina

=== Engineer Brigades ===
20th Engineer Brigade at Fort Bragg, North Carolina

36th Engineer Brigade at Fort Hood, Texas

130th Engineer Brigade at Schofield Barracks, Hawaii

555th Engineer Brigade at Joint Base Lewis-McChord, Washington

7th Engineer Brigade at Ansbach, Germany

=== Field Artillery Brigades ===
17th Field Artillery Brigade at Joint Base Lewis-McChord, Washington

18th Field Artillery Brigade at Fort Bragg

75th Field Artillery Brigade at Fort Sill

210th Field Artillery Brigade at Camp Casey

=== Special Forces Groups ===
1st Special Forces Group (Airborne) at Joint Base Lewis–McChord, Washington

3rd Special Forces Group (Airborne) at Fort Bragg, North Carolina

5th Special Forces Group (Airborne) at Fort Campbell, Kentucky

7th Special Forces Group (Airborne) at Eglin AFB, Florida

10th Special Forces Group (Airborne) at Fort Carson, Colorado

19th Special Forces Group (Airborne) (ARNG) at Draper, UT

20th Special Forces Group (Airborne) (ARNG) at Birmingham, AL

=== Information Operations Groups ===
56th Theater Information Operations Group (ARNG) at Joint Base Lewis–McChord, Washington

71st Theater Information Operations Group (ARNG) at Camp Mabry, TX

151st Theater Information Operations Group (USAR) at Fort Totten (Queens), NY

== Independent regiments ==
=== Cavalry Regiments ===
2nd Cavalry Regiment "Second Dragoons" at Vilseck, Germany

3rd Cavalry Regiment "Brave Rifles" at Fort Hood, Texas

=== Infantry Regiments ===
3rd Infantry Regiment "The Old Guard" at Fort Myer, Virginia (1st and 4th Battalions only; the 2nd Battalion of the 3rd Infantry Regiment is an independent battalion serving a separate command at Fort Lewis, Washington)

=== Armored Regiments ===
11th Armored Cavalry Regiment "Blackhorse" at Fort Irwin, California

278th Armored Cavalry Regiment (ARNG) "I Volunteer, Sir!" at Knoxville, Tennessee.

=== Special Operations Regiments ===
75th Ranger Regiment at Fort Benning, Georgia

160th Special Operations Aviation Regiment (Airborne) "Night Stalkers" at Fort Campbell, Kentucky

== Separate detachments ==
- 6th Military Police Detachment
- 947th Military Police Detachment

== See also ==
- Reorganization plan of United States Army
- List of formations of the United States Army during World War II
- Formations of the United States Army during the Vietnam War
