= United States Army Space and Missile Defense Command =

Space and Missile Defense Command
- Shoulder sleeve insignia
- Founded: 1 October 1997
- Country: United States
- Branch: United States Army
- Part of: U.S. Space Command; U.S. Strategic Command
- Headquarters: Redstone Arsenal, Alabama, U.S.
- Website: www.smdc.army.mil

Commanders
- Commanding General: LTG John L. Rafferty Jr.
- Deputy Commanding General for Operations: BG Donald K. Brooks
- Command Sergeant Major: CSM Rickey G. Jackson

Insignia
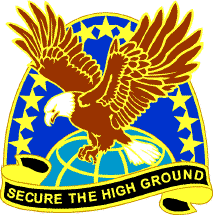
- Distinctive Unit Insignia

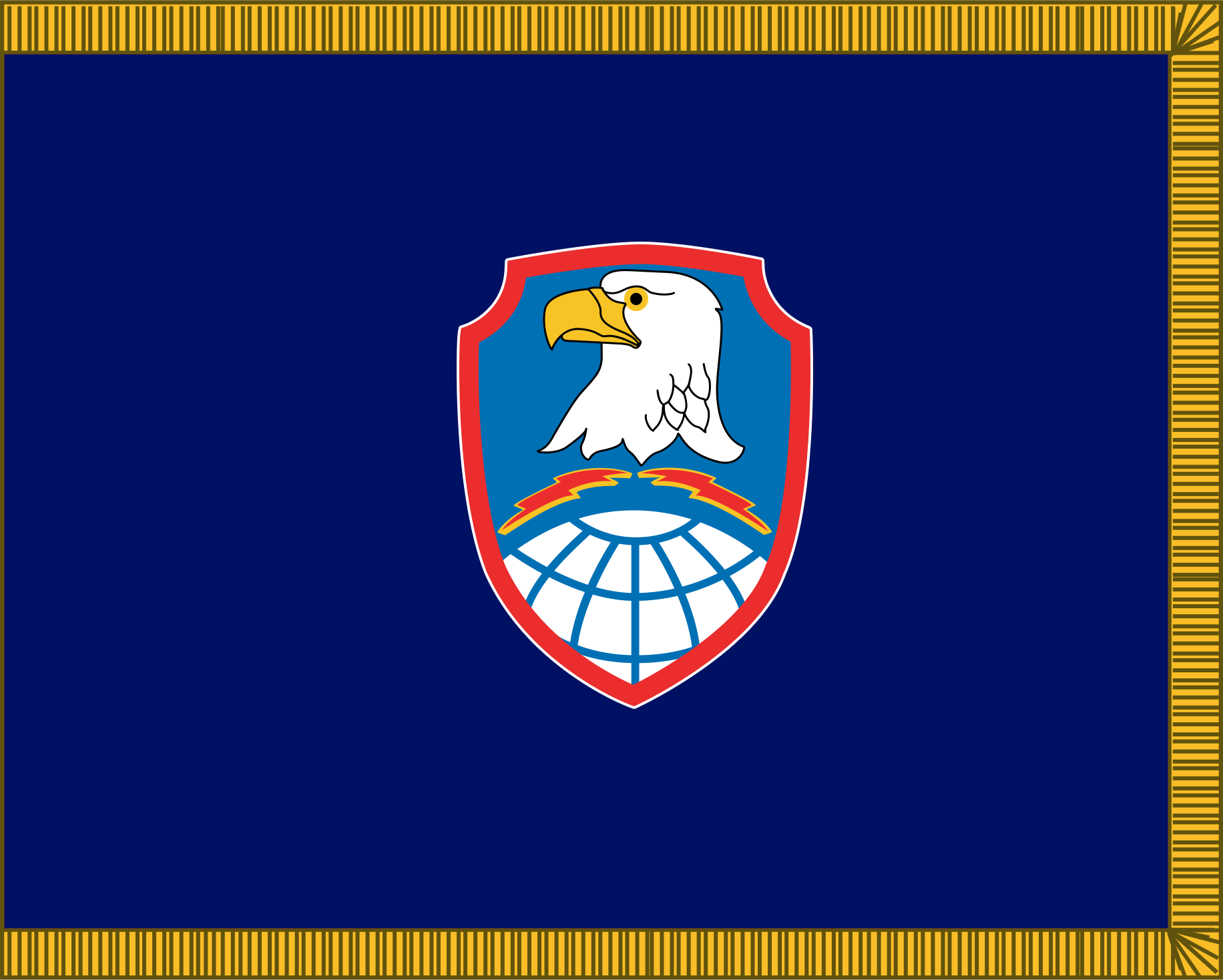
- Space and Missile Defense Command

The United States Army Space and Missile Defense Command (USASMDC) is the Army Service Component Command (ASCC) for United States Strategic Command and United States Space Command. It was established in 1985 as the Army Strategic Defense Command, responsible for ballistic missile defense. In 1992, it merged with Army Space Command to become Army Space and Strategic Defense Command. In 1997, it became an Army Major Command and was redesignated Army Space and Missile Defense Command.

Army Space and Missile Defense Command is responsible for developing and providing the Army with space, missile defense and high altitude capabilities. It consists of two operational elements: the 100th Missile Defense Brigade and the 1st Space Brigade. The commander of Army Space and Missile Defense Command also serves as the commander of United States Space Command's Joint Functional Component Command for Integrated Missile Defense.

Following the Space Force's establishment, the Army's continued involvement with space has become controversial, with multiple proposals and reports advocating for the Space Force to absorb the Army's remaining space forces, as it did with the Navy's space forces, or even Space and Missile Defense Command as a whole. The Space Force has absorbed the Army's satellite communications mission and the Joint Tactical Ground Stations, while the Army maintains the 100th Missile Defense Brigade and a downsized 1st Space Brigade. The Army is attempting to redefine its role in space operations, focused on integrating and interdicting space capabilities for land forces.

== History ==
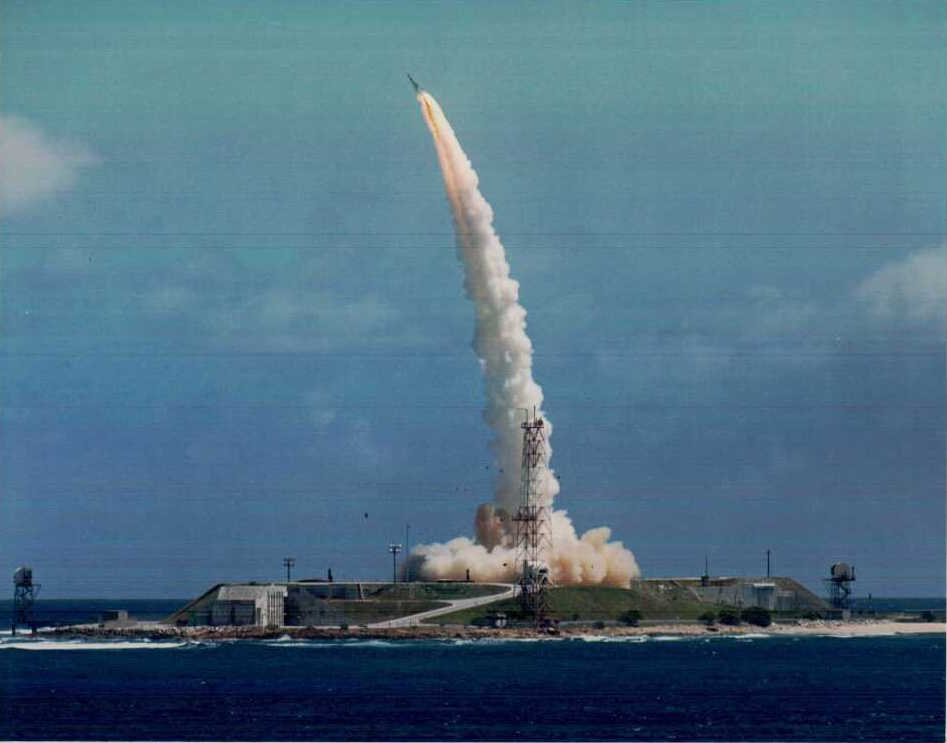
A Sprint missile maneuvering after launch

The Army's involvement with ballistic missile defense can be traced back to the Nike Zeus program in the late-1950s, being developed to counter the Soviet Union's ballistic missiles, however, it was never deployed. This was followed by the Nike-X program, which was replaced by the Sentinel program in 1967 before deployment. The Sentinel program was highly ambitious, intending to operationally deploy 6 Perimeter Acquisition Radars, 17 Missile Site Radars, 480 long-range LIM-49 Spartan missiles, and 220 short-range Sprint missiles. Army support for the Sentinel waned as more resources were required to support its land forces in Vietnam, rather than the secondary mission of ballistic missile defense. Controversy over the Sentinel program led to its suspension in 1969 and it was replaced by the Safeguard program within the year.

Unlike Sentinel, which was intended to protect large areas of the United States, Safeguard was focused on defending the Air Force's missile fields and against a more limited nuclear attack from China. The 1972 Anti-Ballistic Missile Treaty limited the United States and Soviet Union to two anti-ballistic missile sites, later reduced to one in 1974. Only one Safeguard site, at what is now Cavalier Space Force Station, ever reached full operating capability before the program was canceled under congressional pressure in December 1975. The single operational Perimeter Acquisition Radar was repurposed as part of the NORAD early warning system and transferred to the Air Force in 1977. It currently is operated by the Space Force's 10th Space Warning Squadron.

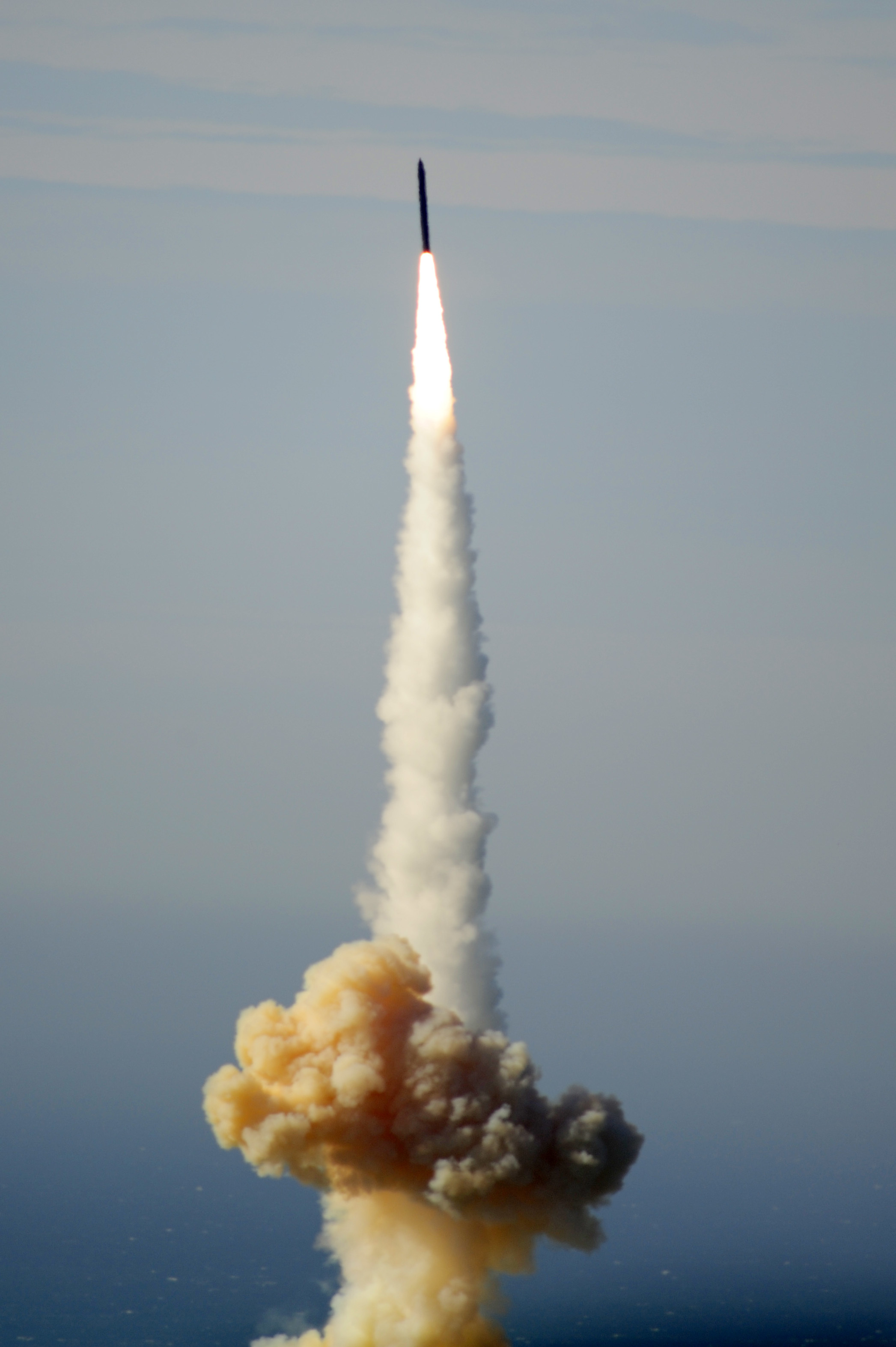
A Ground-Based Midcourse Defense after launch

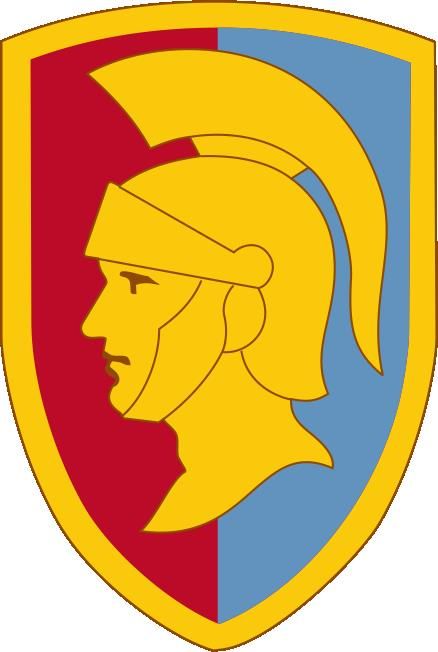
US Army Strategic Defense Command SSI

President Ronald Reagan's 1983 announcement of the Strategic Defense Initiative reinvigorated the Army's missile defense enterprise. The Strategic Defense Initiative Organization was a multi-service organization, consisting of Army, Navy, and Air Force elements. On 1 July 1985, the Army established the Army Strategic Defense Command and served as the lead for ground-based interceptors while the Air Force led the space-based elements of the program.

Following the creation of United States Space Command, the Army was the last of the three services to create a space command. Army Space Command was the smallest, being led by a Colonel. Ultimately, the Army chose to cut Army Space Command staffing by ten percent and merge it with Army Strategic Defense Command to form Army Space and Strategic Defense Command in 1992. Following the Bush and Clinton administrations, the Strategic Defense Initiative was significantly scaled back to focus on protection against limited strikes and the Army began to refocus on theater missile defense.

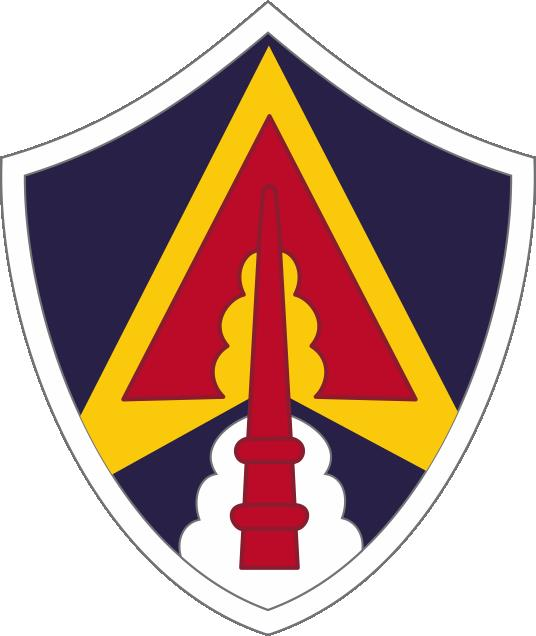
Army Space Command SSI

Army Space Command continued to exist as a specialized sub-command within Army Space and Strategic Defense Command. On 1 May 1995, Army Space Command's Military Satellite Communications Directorate, responsible for operating the Defense Satellite Communications System payload became the 1st Satellite Control Battalion. This was the first regular Army unit with an operational space mission. It also began fielding the Joint Tactical Ground Station and Army Space Support Teams.

In 1997, the Army Space and Strategic Defense Command was renamed Army Space and Missile Defense Command and elevated to a full major command. Following the September 11 attacks, the Army was directed to deploy a national missile defense system, which would become the Ground-Based Midcourse Defenses.

In late 2016, Lieutenant General David Mann's term was extended beyond August 2016 due to the death of his confirmed successor Major General John G. Rossi.

The United States Army Futures Command, formed 24 August 2018, gives priority to modernization of air and missile defense. Cross-functional teams were instituted to oversee modernization in the areas of hypersonic systems, and Integrated Air and Missile Defense Battle Command System (IBCS).

On October 1, 2025, SMDC was assigned two Army air and missile defense commands. The transfer of the 32nd and 263rd Army Air and Missile Defense Commands enhanced SMDC’s air and missile defense capabilities.

== Mission transfers to the United States Space Force ==
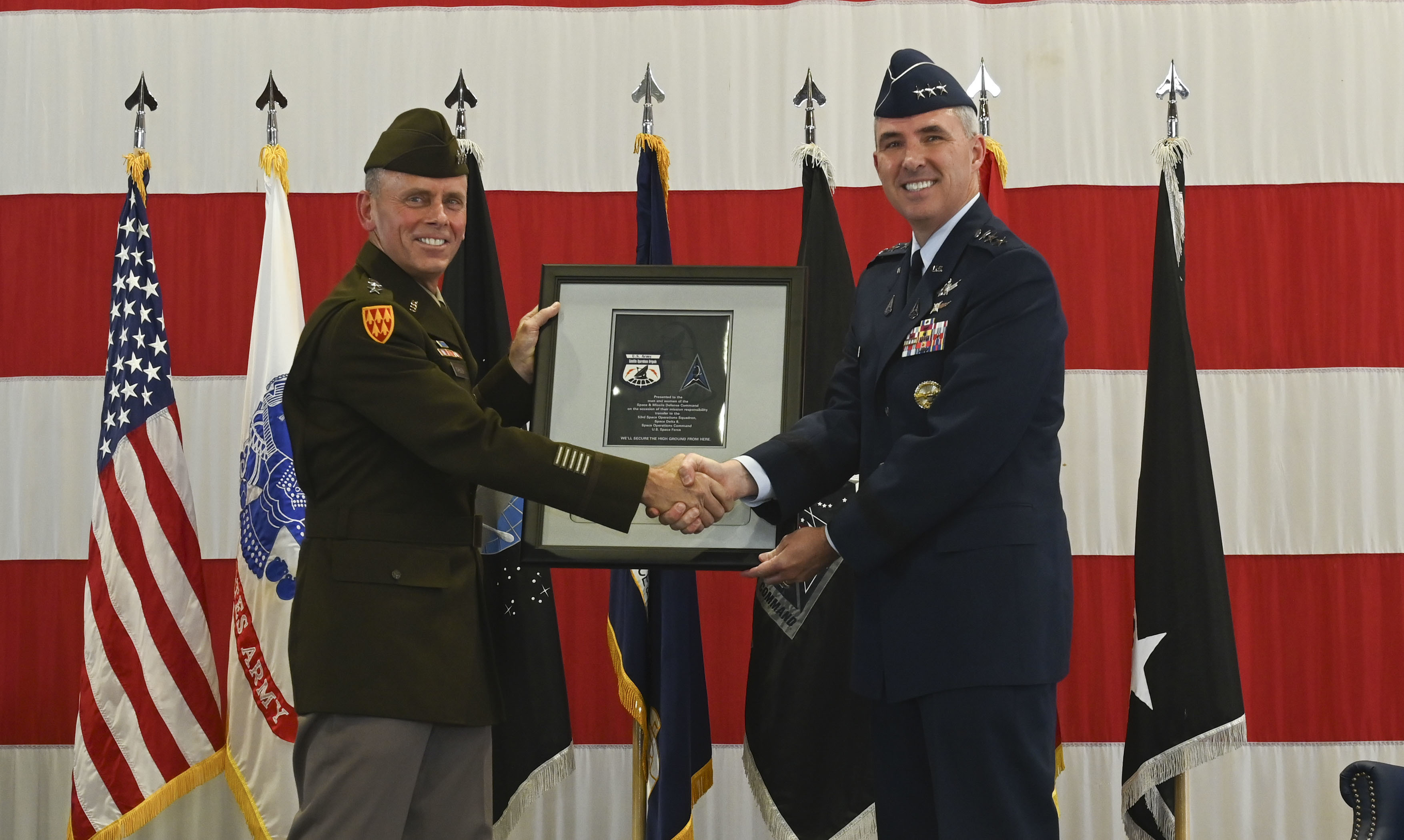
Transfer of the Army satellite communications mission to the Space Force.

When the Space Force was established in 2019 it was intended to consolidate the existing military space forces across the Army, Navy, and Air Force. When the Space Force was established, the greatest resistance to transferring its space forces came from the Army. At the time of the Space Force's establishment in 2019, the Army had three major space operations units: the 1st Space Brigade, 100th Missile Defense Brigade, and the Army Satellite Operations Brigade.

On 21 September 2021, the Army and Space Force announced that the Army's Satellite Operations Brigade would be transferring into the new service. While the Space Force, and Air Force before it, had operated the Defense Satellite Communications System and Wideband Global SATCOM satellites, the Army had traditionally operated the payloads. Payload operates were conducted by the 53d Signal Battalion since 2005 when it replaced the 1st Satellite Control Battalion, which conducted the mission from 1995 to 2005. In 2019, just prior to the Space Force's establishment, the Army established Task Force Eagle, reassigning the 53d Signal Battalion from the 1st Space Brigade and moving elements from Space and Missile Defense Command's G-6 headquarters to consolidate Army satellite communications. Task Force Eagle was renamed the Army Satellite Operations Brigade in 2019. On 15 August 2022, the Army's satellite communications mission was officially transferred to the Space Force and assumed by Space Delta 8 and the 53rd Space Operations Squadron, which took its number to honor the 53rd Signal Battalion.

The debate over the transfer of missile warning was extremely contentious, leading to debates on the Joint Chiefs of Staff. The Space Force, and Air Force Space Command before it, had responsibility for global and national missile warning, while the Army had a small element for regional missile warning. The Joint Tactical Ground Station (JTAGS) was operated by the Army's 1st Space Brigade, receiving, processing and disseminating data from the Space Force's missile warning satellites. Following the satellite communications' transfer, the Army and Space Force began negotiating transferring the missile warning mission. In January 2023, the Space Force announced that the Army agreed to transfer the JTAGS mission to Space Delta 4, fully assuming the mission on 1 October 2023 and activating the 5th Space Warning Squadron.

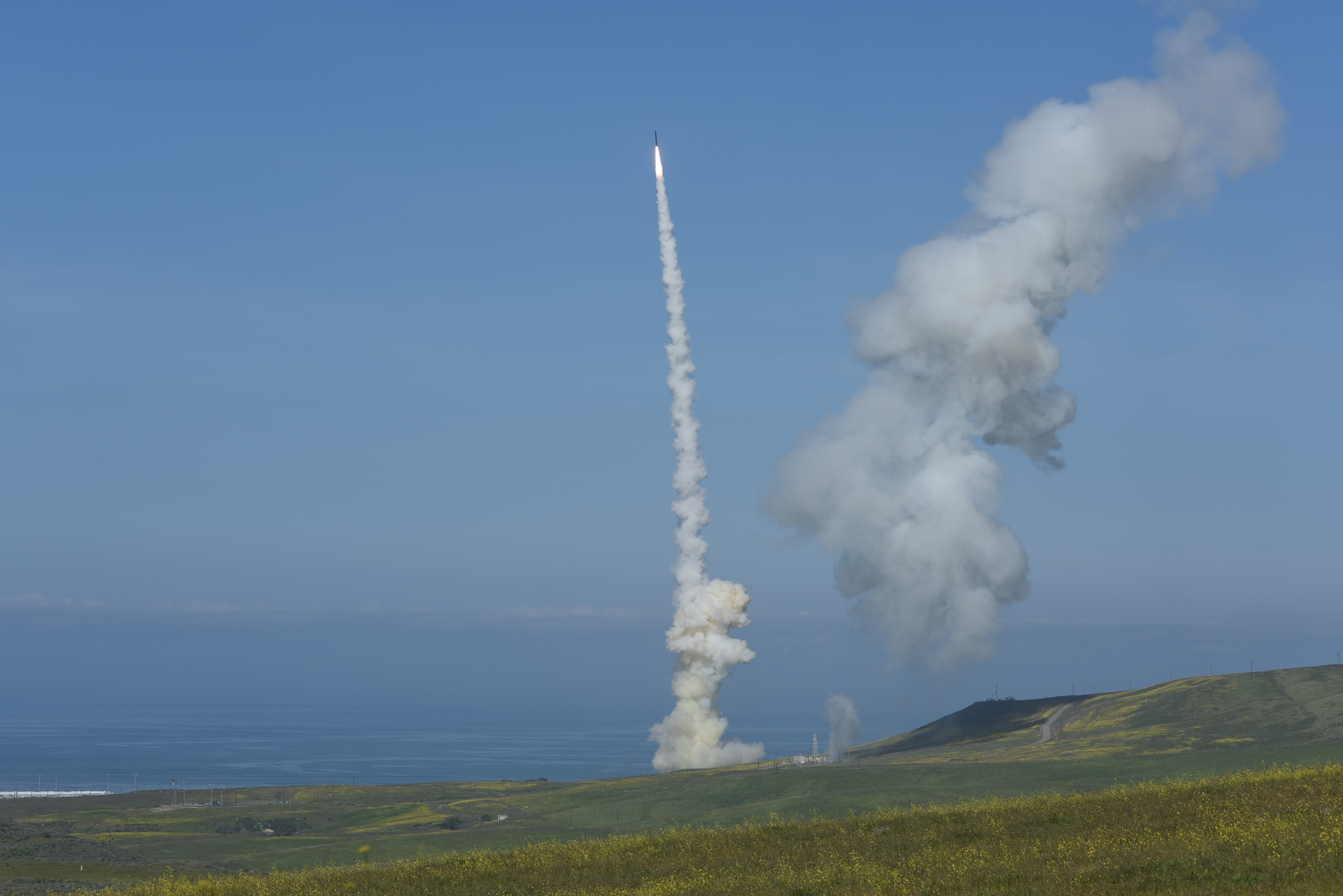
Launch of an Army Ground Based Interceptor from Vandenberg Space Force Base.

There are still calls for the Army to follow the Navy in transferring all of its space forces to the Space Force. The Heritage Foundation has called for the wholesale transfer of Army Space and Missile Defense Command to the Space Force. The 100th Missile Defense Brigade operates the Ground Based Interceptor system out of Schriever Space Force Base, Vandenberg Space Force Base, and Fort Greely. Former Air Force space officers have called to move this mission to the Space Force and the Center for Strategic and International Studies included moving missile defense into the Space Force. The Army also continues to maintain a cadre of Functional Area 40 space operations officers, although over 85% indicated they would transfer to the Space Force if able. The Army is also maintaining a downsized 1st Space Brigade, however the RAND Corporation has conducted a study calling for the transfer of the Army's space control forces to the Space Force.

The Army has attempted to carve out a role in space operations, with its 2024 Army Space Vision outlining the service's space mission as integrating space capabilities and interdicting adversary space capabilities, including counter-satellite communications, counter-surveillance and reconnaissance, and navigation warfare in support of land operations. Responsibility for conducting these operations rest with Army Multi-Domain Task Forces and a new space formation called the Theater Strike Effects Group. However, the Army is no longer looking to develop and deploy its own constellations of satellites.

In January 2026, the Army announced a new military occupational specialty (MOS) 40D Tactical Space Operations Specialist for soldiers in the grade of E-4 through E-9 in the regular army, reserves and National Guard. Soldiers wanting to enter the MOS, must apply and then go to training at U.S. Army Space and Missile Defense School in Colorado. The Army saw an initial need for 1,000 soldiers in this MOS. This MOS would become the foundation of a proposed Space Operations Branch. On 1 October 2026, the Army officially established the Space Operations Branch. During the activation, more than 600 Soldiers reclassified to the new 40D Tactical Space Operations Specialist military occupational specialty (MOS), selecting from nearly 3,000 applicants from soldiers across branches like Military Intelligence, the Signal Corps, and Air Defense Artillery. The branch also includes the 40A officer branch designation. Soldiers in these roles undergo specialized training at the Space and Missile Defense Center of Excellence in Colorado Springs, Colorado, focusing on counter-SATCOM, stratospheric warfare, navigation warfare, and counter sensing.

== Structure ==
The SMDC is made up of several components, Active Army and full-time Army National Guard, due to the 24-hour a day, 7-day a week, 365-day a year nature of SMDC's mission:

Name	Mission	Headquarters
100th Missile Defense Brigade (100 MDB)	Operates the Ground-Based Midcourse Defense system	Schriever Space Force Base, Colorado
1st Space Brigade	Provide trained and ready space forces to conduct continuous global space force enhancement, space support, space control and special missions	Colorado Springs, Colorado
Space and Missile Defense Center of Excellence	Builds and enables space and missile defense forces responsive to warfighter needs	Colorado Springs, Colorado
Technical Center	Provides technologies to meet today’s requirements and future needs in directed energy, space, cyberspace, hypersonics and integrated air and missile defense	Redstone Arsenal, Alabama
32nd Army Air and Missile Defense Command	U.S.-based air and missile defense forces performing or expected to perform homeland defense missions.	Fort Bliss, Texas
263rd Army Air and Missile Defense Command	U.S.-based air and missile defense forces performing or expected to perform homeland defense missions.	Anderson, South Carolina

== List of commanding generals ==
No.	Commanding General		Term		
No.	Portrait	Name	Took office	Left office	Term length
Commanding General, U.S. Army Strategic Defense Command
1	John F. Wall	Lieutenant General; John F. Wall (1931–2024)	1 July 1985	24 May 1988	2 years, 328 days
-	Robert L. Stewart	Brigadier General; Robert L. Stewart (born 1942); Acting	24 May 1988	11 July 1988	48 days
2	Robert D. Hammond	Lieutenant General; Robert D. Hammond (1933–2014)	11 July 1988	30 June 1992	3 years, 355 days
-	William J. Schumacher	Brigadier General; William J. Schumacher (1938–2021); Acting	30 June 1992	31 July 1992	31 days
Commanding General, U.S. Army Space and Strategic Defense Command
3	Donald M. Lionetti	Lieutenant General; Donald M. Lionetti (1940–2019)	24 August 1992	6 September 1994	2 years, 13 days
4	Jay M. Garner	Lieutenant General; Jay M. Garner (born 1938)	6 September 1994	7 October 1996	2 years, 31 days
5	Edward G. Anderson III	Lieutenant General; Edward G. Anderson III	7 October 1996	1 October 1997	359 days
Commanding General, U.S. Army Space and Missile Defense Command
5	Edward G. Anderson III	Lieutenant General; Edward G. Anderson III	1 October 1997	6 August 1998	309 days
-	Steven W. Flohr	Colonel; Steven W. Flohr; Acting	6 August 1998	1 October 1998	56 days
6	John P. Costello	Lieutenant General; John P. Costello (1947–2010)	1 October 1998	28 March 2001	2 years, 178 days
-	John M. Urias	Brigadier General; John M. Urias; Acting	28 March 2001	30 April 2001	33 days
7	Joseph M. Cosumano Jr.	Lieutenant General; Joseph M. Cosumano Jr. (born 1946)	30 April 2001	16 December 2003	2 years, 230 days
8	Larry J. Dodgen	Lieutenant General; Larry J. Dodgen (1949–2010)	16 December 2003	18 December 2006	3 years, 2 days
9	Kevin T. Campbell	Lieutenant General; Kevin T. Campbell	18 December 2006	15 December 2010	3 years, 362 days
10	Richard P. Formica	Lieutenant General; Richard P. Formica	15 December 2010	12 August 2013	2 years, 240 days
11	David L. Mann	Lieutenant General; David L. Mann	12 August 2013	5 January 2017	3 years, 146 days
12	James H. Dickinson	Lieutenant General; James H. Dickinson (born c. 1963)	5 January 2017	5 December 2019	2 years, 334 days
13	Daniel L. Karbler	Lieutenant General; Daniel L. Karbler	6 December 2019	9 January 2024	4 years, 34 days
14	Sean A. Gainey	Lieutenant General; Sean A. Gainey	9 January 2024	29 April 2026	2 years, 110 days
15	John L. Rafferty Jr.	Lieutenant General; John L. Rafferty Jr.	29 April 2026	Incumbent	160 days
