= Joseph M. Cosumano =

United States Army general

Joseph M. Cosumano Jr.
- Born: December 15, 1946 (age 79); Shreveport, Louisiana, U.S.
- Education: Northwestern State College (B.S., M.S.)
- Military career
- Allegiance: United States
- Branch: United States Army
- Service years: 1970–2003
- Rank: Lieutenant General
- Commands: Commander, U.S. Army Space and Missile Defense Command (SMDC); Commander, United States Army Space Command
- Awards: Defense Distinguished Service Medal; Army Distinguished Service Medal; Defense Superior Service Medal; Legion of Merit with two oak leaf clusters Meritorious Service Medal with three oak leaf clusters Parachutist Badge; Army Aviator Badge; Army Staff Identification Badge; Joint Chiefs of Staff Identification Badge; Office of the Secretary of Defense Identification Badge
- Other work: President of CFD Research Corporation (CFDRC); Honorary Colonel of the Northwestern Demon Regiment

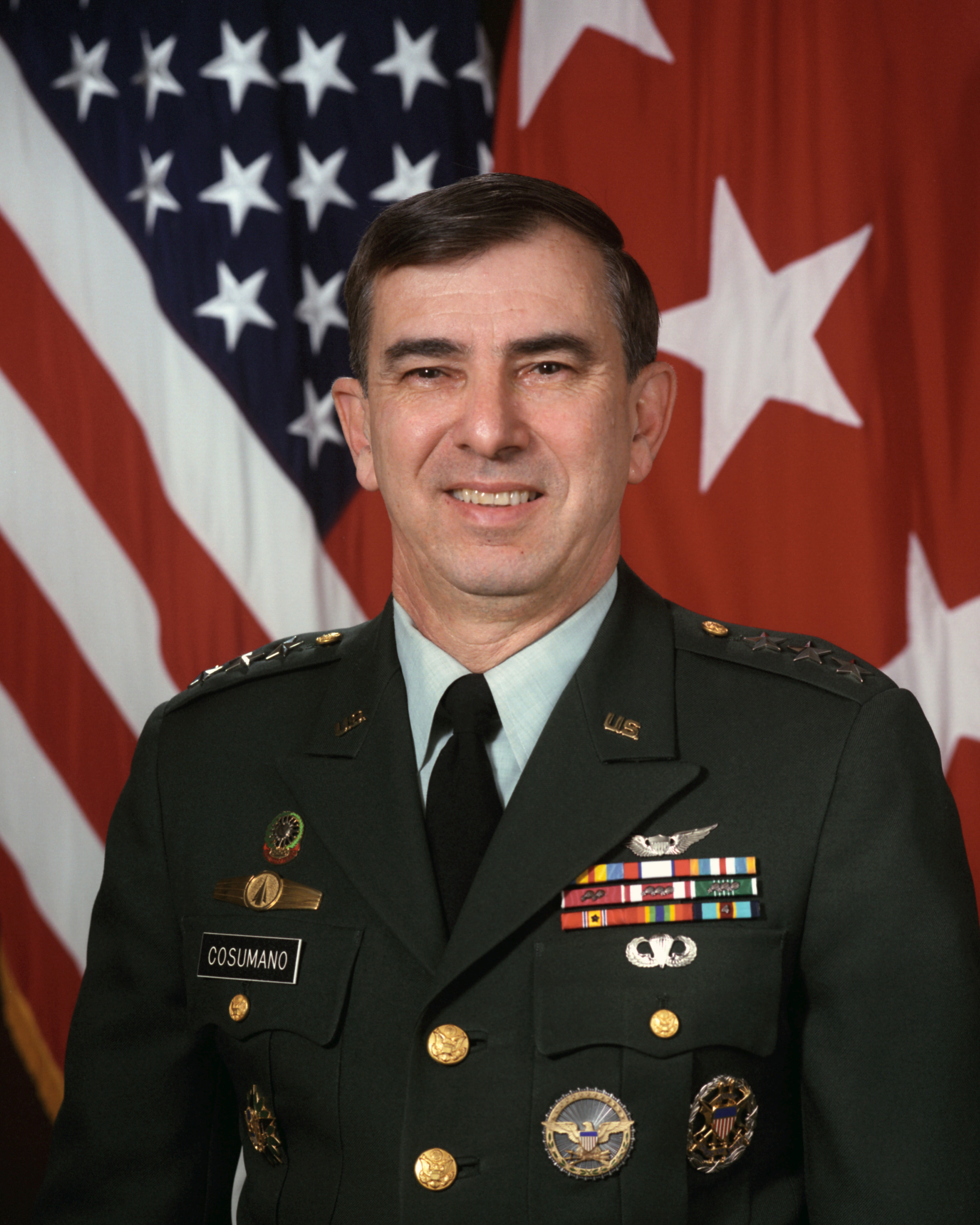
Lieutenant General Joseph M. Cosumano Jr.

Lieutenant General Joseph M. Cosumano Jr. (born December 15, 1946), was the commander of the U.S. Army Space and Missile Defense Command (SMDC) and the U.S. Army Space Command from April 30, 2001, to December 16, 2003, when he was replaced by Lieutenant General Larry J. Dodgen.

Raised in Shreveport, Louisiana, Cosumano is a 1964 graduate of Woodlawn High School. He earned B.S. and M.S. degrees in industrial technology from Northwestern State College. Commissioned through the Army ROTC program at Northwestern State in 1968, Cosumano reported for duty after completing his master's degree in 1970.

In 2013, he joined CFD Research Corporation (CFDRC) as president.

LTG (Ret) Joseph Cosumano currently serves as the Honorary Colonel of the Northwestern Demon Regiment at his alma mater, Northwestern State University of Louisiana in Natchitoches, Louisiana.

== Awards and decorations ==
His military decorations include the Defense Distinguished Service Medal, the Army Distinguished Service Medal, the Defense Superior Service Medal, the Legion of Merit with two oak leaf clusters and the Meritorious Service Medal with three oak leaf clusters. He has earned the Parachutist Badge, Army Aviator Badge, Army Staff Identification Badge, Joint Chiefs of Staff Identification Badge and Office of the Secretary of Defense Identification Badge.

- Defense Distinguished Service Medal
- Army Distinguished Service Medal
- Defense Superior Service Medal
- Legion of Merit with two oak leaf clusters
- Meritorious Service Medal with three oak leaf clusters

In 2016, Cosumano was inducted into the U.S. Army ROTC National Hall of Fame. In 2020, he was presented the Omar N. Bradley Spirit of Independence Award.
