= Kevin T. Campbell =

United States Army general

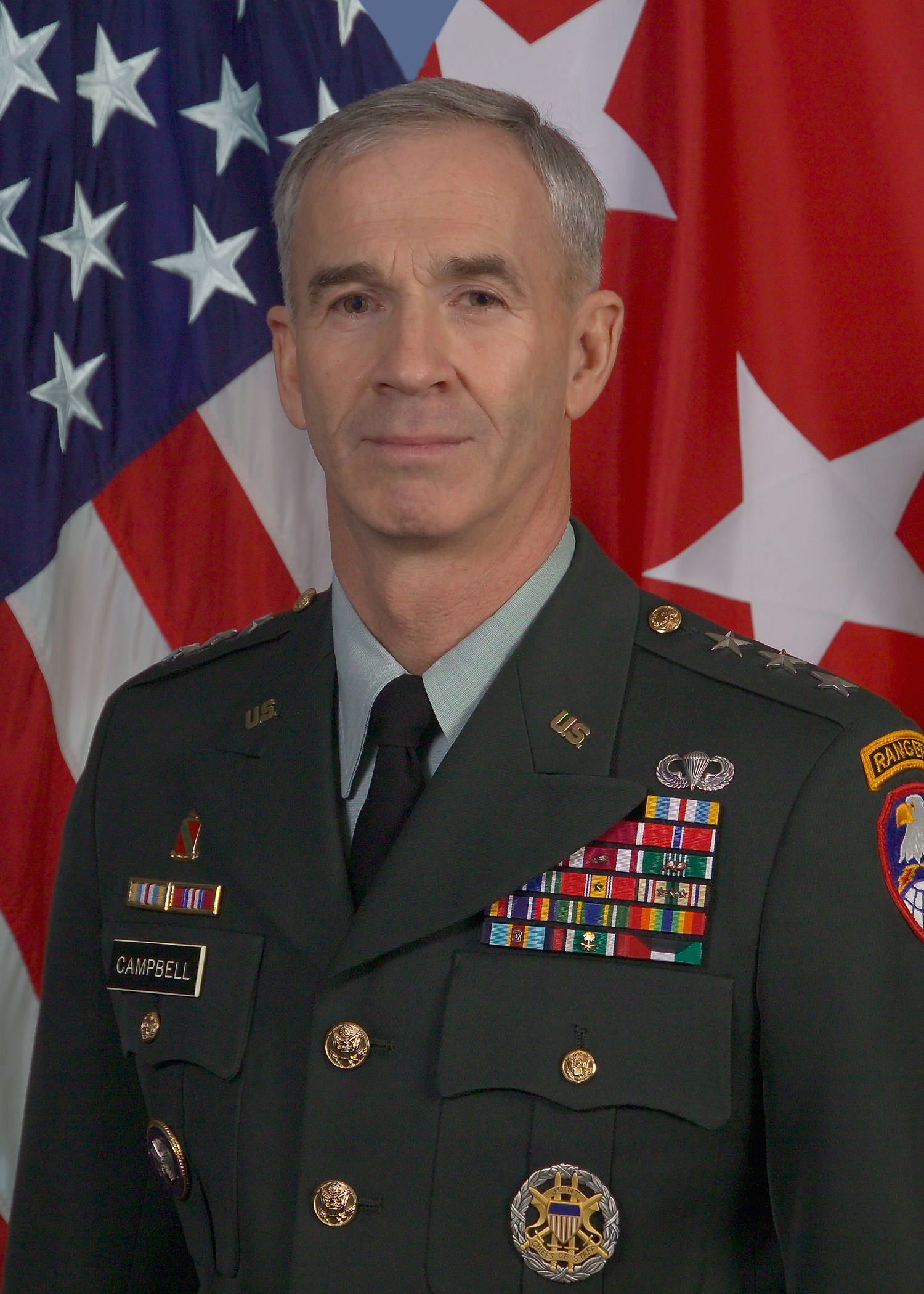
- Lieutenant General Kevin T. Campbell
- Military career
- Allegiance: United States of America
- Branch: United States Army
- Service years: 1973-2011
- Rank: Lieutenant General
- Commands: Space and Missile Defense Command; 32nd Army Air and Missile Defense Command
- Awards: Defense Superior Service Medal; Legion of Merit; Bronze Star; Ranger Tab

Lieutenant General Kevin T. Campbell was the commander of the U.S. Army Space and Missile Defense Command from December 2006 to December 2010, replacing Lieutenant General Larry J. Dodgen. In October 2011 Campbell began working for Northrop Grumman Corporation as vice president and corporate lead executive (CLE) for company business after retiring from the Army.

Campbell graduated from Worcester State College in 1973 with a Bachelor of Science degree. He received his commission into the Air Defense Artillery branch that same year. In 1982, he earned a master's degree in personnel management from the University of New Hampshire. His military education includes the Air Defense Artillery Officer Basic and Advanced Courses, the Nike-Hercules Officer Course, Ranger and Airborne Schools, the Army Command and General Staff College, and the Naval War College.

General Campbell's previous assignments include: Chief of Staff, United States Strategic Command, Offutt Air Force Base, Nebraska; Director of Plans, United States Space Command; Deputy Commanding General, United States Army Air Defense Artillery Center and Fort Bliss, Texas; Commanding General, 32nd Army Air and Missile Defense Command (32nd AAMDC), Fort Bliss, Texas; Assistant Deputy Chief of Staff for Combat Developments, United States Army Training and Doctrine Command, Fort Monroe, Virginia; Commander, 94th Air Defense Artillery Brigade, Darmstadt, Germany; Political-Military Planner (Eastern Europe/Bosnia), J5, the Joint Staff, Washington, D.C.; G3, 32nd AADCOM, Darmstadt, Germany; Commander, 2nd Battalion (PATRIOT), 43rd Air Defense Artillery, Hanau, Germany; Executive Officer, 3rd Battalion (PATRIOT), 43rd Air Defense Artillery, Fort Bliss, Texas; Chief, Unit Training Division, Directorate of Training and Doctrine, Fort Bliss, Texas; ROTC Instructor, University of New Hampshire; Adjutant, 1st Battalion (HAWK), 2nd Air Defense Artillery, Korea; Assistant Operations Officer, 38th Air Defense Artillery Brigade, Korea; Commander, Nike Hercules Battery, Homestead Air Force Base, Florida, and Fort Bliss, Texas; and Artillery Team Commander, Datteln, Germany.

== Awards and decorations ==
General Campbell's decorations and awards include the Legion of Merit, Bronze Star, Defense Meritorious Service Medal, Meritorious Service Medal (with oak leaf cluster), Army Commendation Medal (with three oak leaf clusters), Army Achievement Medal (with three oak leaf clusters), Southwest Asia Service Medal (with three oak leaf clusters), Kuwait Liberation Medal (Saudi Arabia), Kuwait Liberation Medal (Kuwait), Ranger Tab, and Parachutist Badge.

- Legion of Merit
- Bronze Star
- Defense Meritorious Service Medal
- Meritorious Service Medal with oak leaf cluster
- Army Commendation Medal with three oak leaf clusters
- Army Achievement Medal with three oak leaf clusters
- Southwest Asia Service Medal with three oak leaf clusters
- Kuwait Liberation Medal
- Kuwait Liberation Medal
- Ranger Tab
- Parachutist Badge
