= General Costello =

General Costello may refer to:

- Edmund Costello (1873–1949), British Indian Army brigadier general
- John P. Costello (1947–2010), U.S. Army lieutenant general
- Michael Joe Costello (1904–1986), Irish Army lieutenant general
