= Theater Event System =

The United States Theater Event System (TES) is a missile-warning system. The TES is composed of three ground elements: the Space Based Infrared System (SBIRS) Mission Control Station, the Joint Tactical Ground Station (JTAGS), and the Tactical Detection and Reporting system. The TES in-theater capability will be enhanced significantly as its hardware and software are upgraded to interface with the future SBIRS High and Space Tracking and Surveillance System satellite constellations.

== See also ==
- Joint Tactical Ground Station (JTAGS)
- Defense Support Program (DSP)
- Space Based Infrared System (SBIRS)
