= 5th Space Warning Squadron =

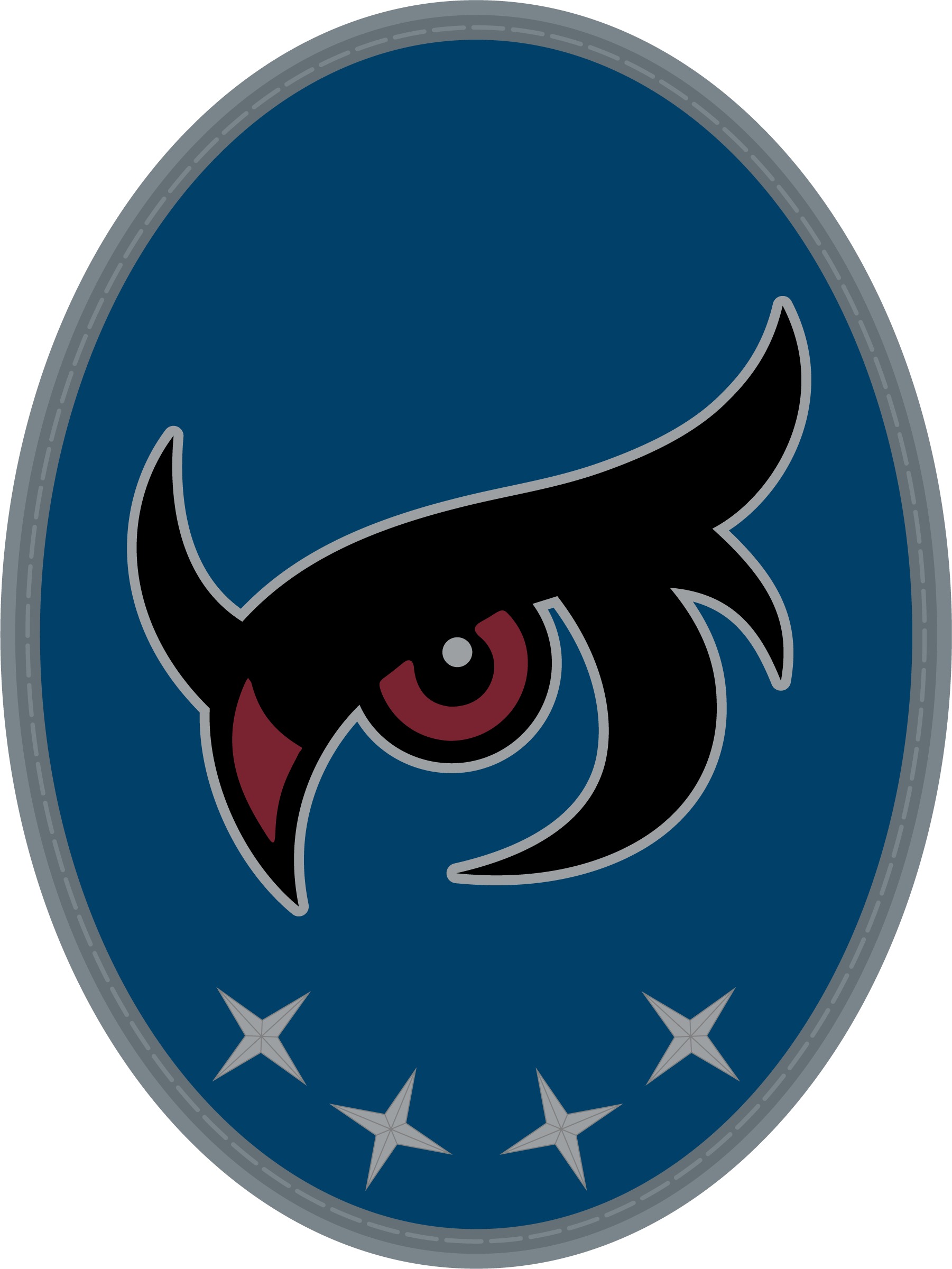
- 5th Space Warning Squadron emblem
- Active: 1992-1999, 2023-present
- Country: United States
- Branch: United States Space Force
- Type: Space Operations
- Role: Missile Warning
- Part of: Mission Delta 4
- Garrison/HQ: Buckley Space Force Base, Colorado
- Nickname: Ornery Owls
- Anniversaries: 13 October 2023

Commanders
- Current commander: Lt Col Robert M. Smith

The United States Space Force's 5th Space Warning Squadron (5 SWS) is an in-theater missile warning unit headquartered at Buckley Space Force Base, Colorado. It operates the Joint Tactical Ground Station (JTAGS) system via four forward-stationed combat detachments located in Italy, Qatar, South Korea, and Japan.

== Assignments ==
- 21st Operations Group, 15 May 1992-8 Jun 1995
- 21st Space Wing, 8 Jun 1995-10 Aug 1999
- 821st Space Group, 10 Aug 1999-12 Oct 1999
- Mission Delta 4, 13 Oct 2023-present

== History ==
From 1992 to 1999, the 5th Space Warning Squadron operated the only ground station in the Southern Hemisphere for the Defense Support Program, a space-based system that provides global missile warning. It used to be known as the 5th Joint Defense Space Communications Squadron.

== Commanders ==
- Col John Harris, USAF, 1993–1995
- Col Henry W. Poburka, USAF, 12 Jul 1995-1997
- Col Thomas Meade, 1997-1999
- Lt Col Michael A. Provencher, USSF, 13 Oct 2023-3 May 2024
- Lt Col Robert M. Smith, USSF, 3 May 2024-8 June 2026
- Lt Col Brian C. Stewart, USSF, 8 June 2026-Present

== Station ==
- Woomera AS, Australia, 15 May 1992-12 Oct 1999
- Buckley SFB, Colorado, 13 Oct 2023-present

== Decorations ==
- Air Force Outstanding Unit Award
  - 1 Jan 2000-31 Aug 2001
  - 1 Jan 1999-31 Dec 1999
  - 1 Oct 1995-30 Sep 1997
  - 1 Oct 1992-30 Sep 1994
  - 1 Sep 1989-31 Aug 1991
  - 2 May 1973 – 1 May 1976
  - 17 Nov 1971-1 May 1973

== See also ==
- Joint Tactical Ground Station
- Defense Support Program
- Space-Based Infrared System
- 2d Space Warning Squadron
- 8th Space Warning Squadron
- 11th Space Warning Squadron
- Mission Delta 4
