= Matthew L. Lohmeier =

American government official

Matt Lohmeier
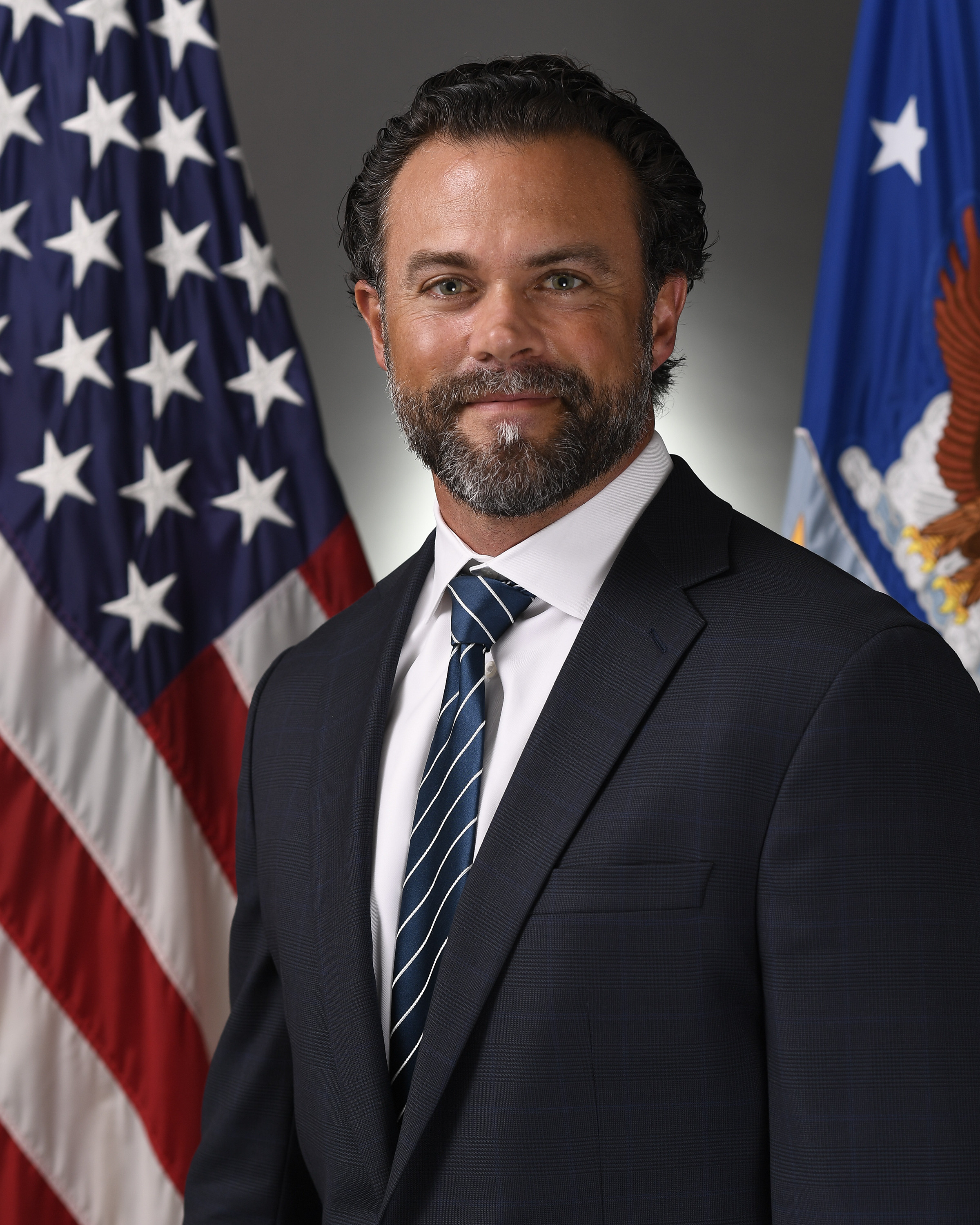
- Official portrait, 2025

United States Under Secretary of the Air Force
- Incumbent
- Assumed office July 25, 2025
- President: Donald Trump
- Preceded by: Melissa Dalton

Personal details
- Education: United States Air Force Academy; Air University; School of Advanced Air and Space Studies
- Occupation: Military officer Government official Author

Military service
- Allegiance: United States
- Branch/service: United States Air Force; United States Space Force
- Years of service: 2006–2021
- Rank: Lieutenant colonel
- Unit: 460th Space Wing; Space-based missile warning
- Commands: 11th Space Warning Squadron

Matthew Lohmeier is an American defense official and author serving as the United States Under Secretary of the Air Force since July 25, 2025. He previously served as a pilot and space officer in the US Air Force and US Space Force.

== Military career ==
Matthew Lohmeier graduated from the United States Air Force Academy in 2006 with a Bachelors of Science degree in Social Sciences. After graduation, he attended Undergraduate Pilot Training at Vance AFB. After pilot training, he remained at Vance AFB as a T-38 Talon instructor pilot. He then flew the F-15C Eagle and was stationed at Kadena AB. He then became a space officer and worked in the 460th Space Wing at Buckley AFB.

=== Command and dismissal ===
In 2020, Lohmeier began commanding the 11th Space Warning Squadron in the United States Space Force. During this time, he published a book titled Irresistible Revolution: Marxism’s Goal of Conquest & the Unmaking of the American Military, which was critical of current military policy. Following his appearances on podcasts discussing his book in 2021, he was investigated and dismissed by Lieutenant General Stephen Whiting, the Space Operations Command commander.

== Under Secretary of the Air Force ==
In January 2025, President Donald Trump stated that he intended for Lohmeier to serve as the Under Secretary of the Air Force. He was confirmed on July 24, 2025.

== Personal life ==
Lohmeier is married to the granddaughter of the Mormon apostle Bruce R. McConkie. In 2022, he hosted the podcast The Matt Lohmeier Show. In a 2017 interview with Mormon Stories Podcast, Lohmeier stated that he joined the Church of Jesus Christ of Latter-day Saints (LDS Church) as a teenager, and completed a mission trip to Taiwan. He and his wife joined the Snuffer movement and were excommunicated from the LDS Church.

== Gallery ==
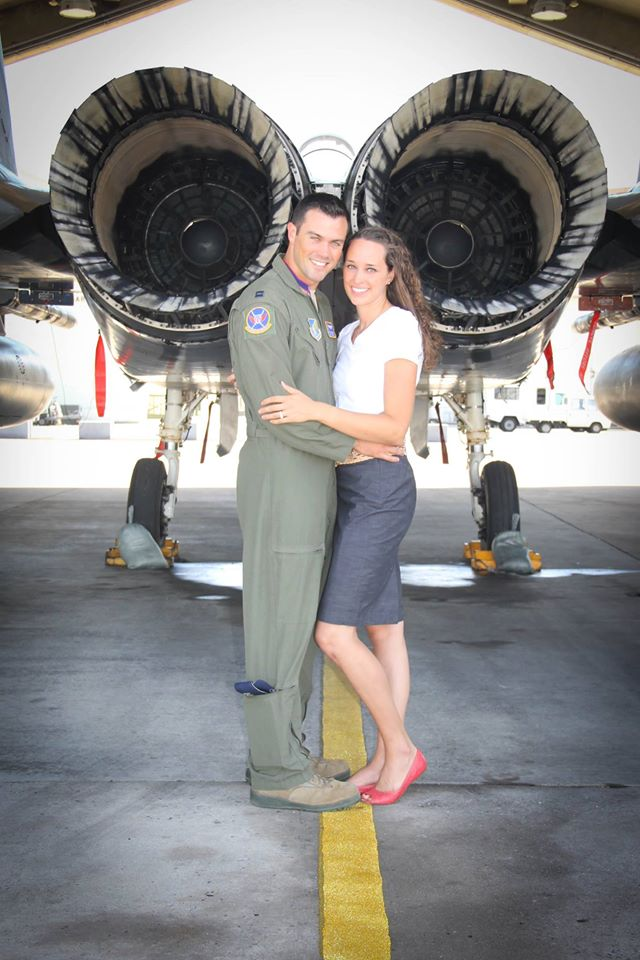
Lohmeier and his wife behind an F-15C

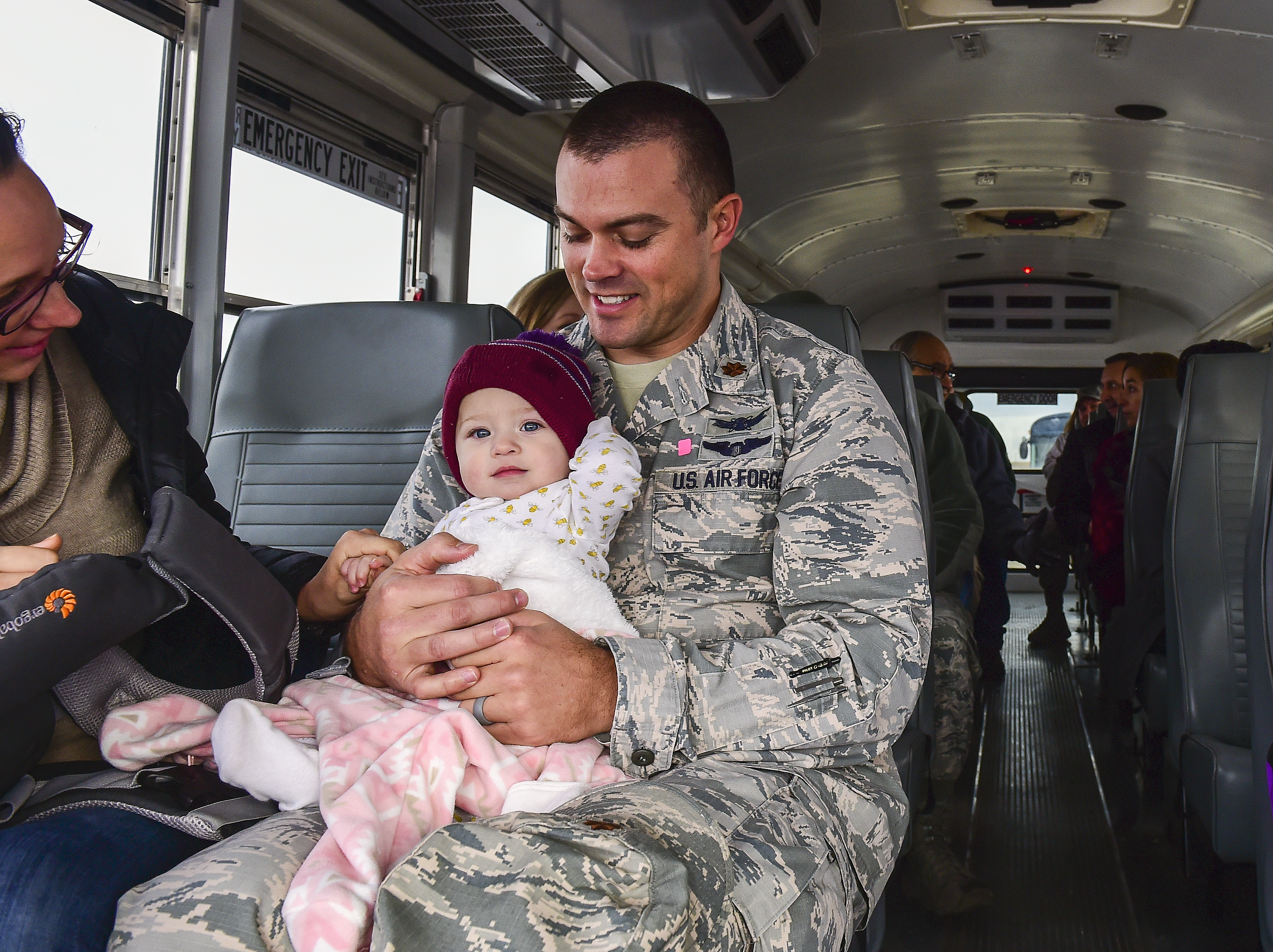
Lohmeier with his daughter
