= John P. Costello =

United States Army lieutenant general

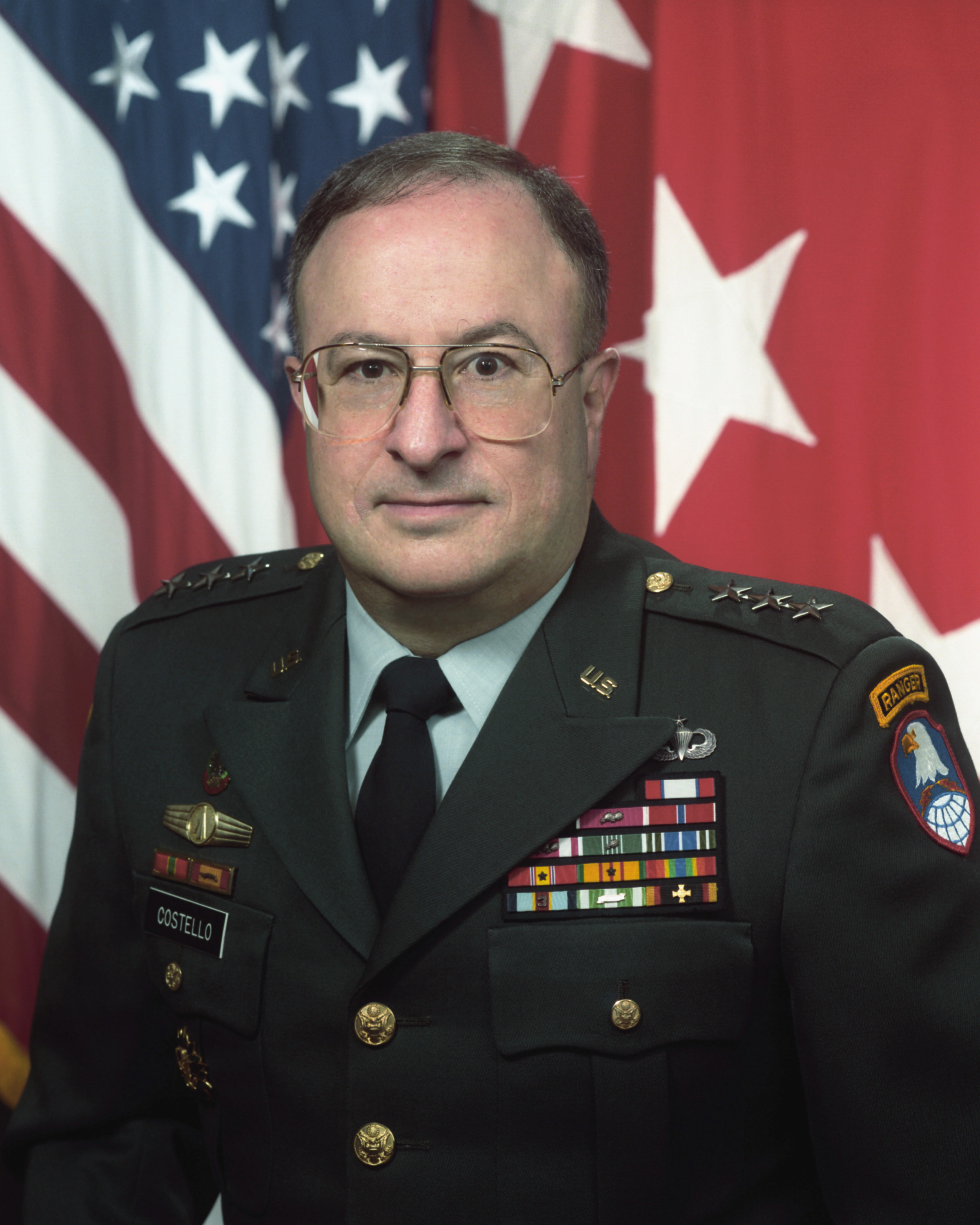
- Born: April 24, 1947; Pottsville, Pennsylvania, U.S.
- Died: December 27, 2010 (aged 63) Coles Point, Virginia, U.S.
- Buried: Arlington National Cemetery
- Allegiance: United States
- Branch: United States Army
- Service years: 1969-2001
- Rank: Lieutenant General
- Commands: United States Army Space and Missile Defense Command; United States Army Air Defense Artillery School; 32d Air Defense Command; 35th Air Defense Artillery Brigade; 2d Battalion, 59th Air Defense Artillery Brigade
- Conflicts: Vietnam War
- Awards: Army Distinguished Service Medal; Legion of Merit; Bronze Star Medal

John P. “Jack” Costello (April 24, 1947 – December 27, 2010) was a United States Army lieutenant general who served as commanding general of the United States Army Space and Missile Defense Command from 1998 to 2001 and also as Commanding General of the United States Army Air Defense Artillery School. After retiring from military service he was a vice president with the Raytheon Corporation in Dallas, Texas.

== Life and career ==
Born in Pottsville, Pennsylvania, Costello was commissioned in 1969 as a field artillery officer from the Army ROTC unit at The Citadel where he earned a bachelor's degree in political science. As a junior officer he served in South Vietnam as an advisor to the 4th Air Defense Artillery Regiment, then as a Battery Commander with Air Defense units under the 82d Airborne Division at Fort Bragg and the 8th Infantry Division in Germany. Later assignments included Battalion Commander with the 1st Armored Division in Germany and Commander of the 35th Air Defense Brigade at Fort Lewis, Washington. His General Officer billets were as Commanding General, 32d Army Air Defense Command, Assistant Commander of the 1st Armored Division, Commanding General of the Army Air Defense Artillery School and Center at Fort Bliss, Texas and Commanding General of the Army Space and Missile Command at Redstone Arsenal, Alabama.
He retired in 2001 after 32 years of service, his major awards included the Army Distinguished Service Medal, Legion of Merit and Bronze Star Medal. He earned a master's degree from The University of Virginia and a master's degree from the United States Army Command and General Staff College; he was also a graduate of the Senior Executives Program at the John F. Kennedy School of Government, Harvard University. After retirement he served as vice president of business development and strategic planning for the Raytheon Centric Systems Group, where he led research efforts on defeating improvised explosive devices.
