= Sagami General Depot =

U.S. Army post in Kanagawa Prefecture, Japan

Coordinates: 35°34′51″N 139°22′40″E

- Sagamihara, Japan
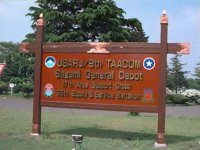
- Home of the 35th Combat Sustainment Support Battalion

Site information
- Type: Military Base
- Controlled by: Japan; United States

Site history
- Built: 1935

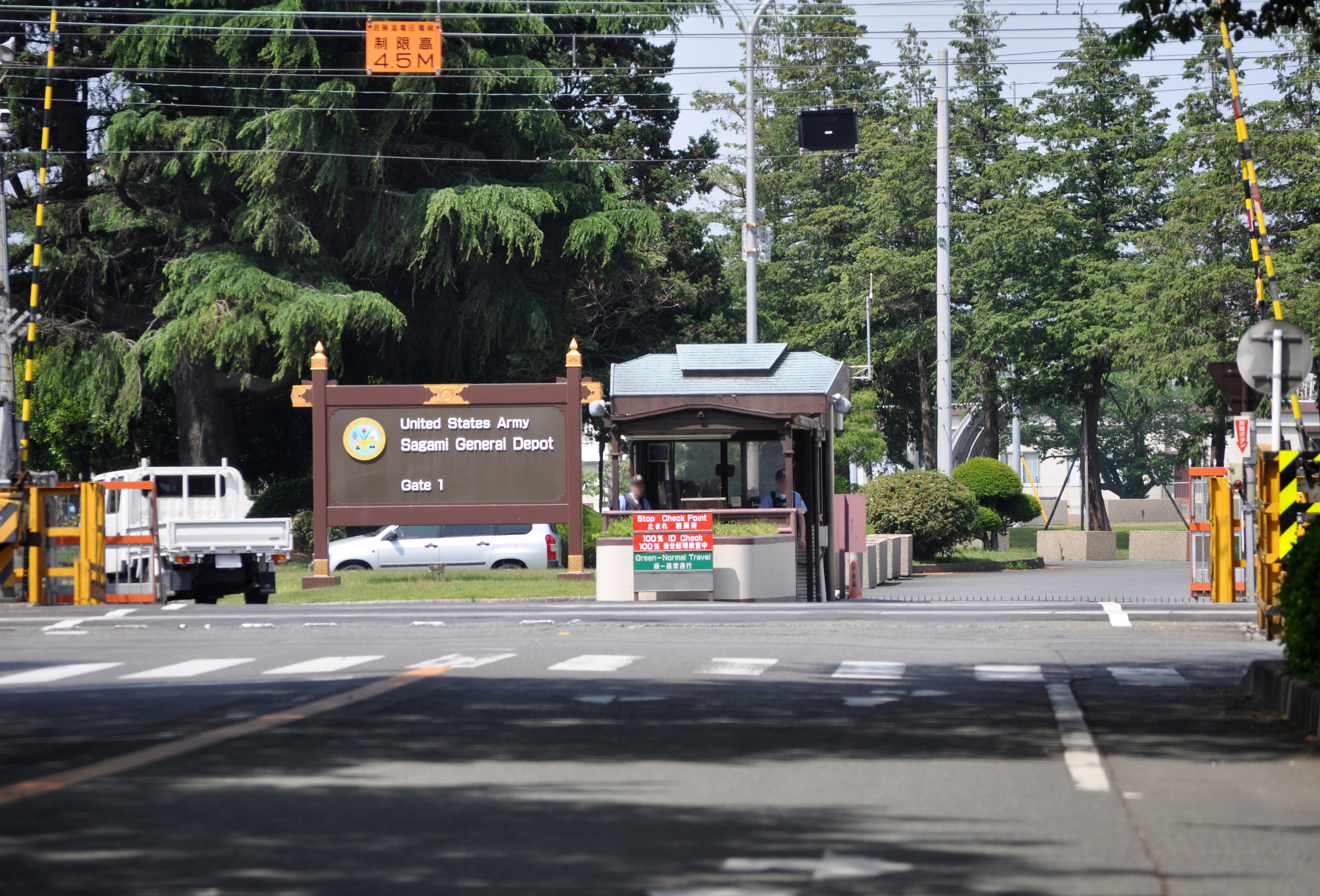
Main Gate of Sagami General Depot

Sagami General Depot (相模総合補給廠, Sagami Sōgō Hokyūshō) is a United States Army post located in the city of Sagamihara, in Kanagawa Prefecture, Japan, about 40 km (25 mi) southwest of Tokyo.

== Depot ==
Sagami General Depot is located in the city of Sagamihara, Kanagawa Prefecture, Honshu, Japan. Sagami Depot is home to the 38th Air Defense Artillery Brigade, Defense Commissary Agency Central Distribution Center, Defense Logistics Agency for US forces in Japan, and Army Medical Storage.

== History ==
Sagami General Depot currently occupies the grounds of a former Imperial Japanese Army installation which opened in 1935 as the Sixth Arsenal under Colonel Ikeda as a branch of the Tokyo First Army Arsenal. In 1936 the Imperial Army made the arsenal a separate activity and renamed it Sagami Army Arsenal. The primary function was manufacturing armaments and weapons, mostly tanks, for the Japanese Army. Sagami Depot was also the test bed for the development of the 120-ton “O-I” experimental heavy tank as well as manufacturing Fu-Go balloon bombs, which Japanese forces launched from Chiba to start fires in the west coast region of the U.S.

In September 1945, Sagami was occupied by the 5th Cavalry Regiment. The installation played a major role in the support of U.S. forces during the Korean War. In 1957, the Army began to scale back operations at Sagami General Depot, and the U.S. Army Supply and Maintenance Activity (which performed maintenance and repair of heavy equipment and tanks) was deactivated after the Vietnam War. Today, the installation continues to be used by the U.S. Army as a logistics and supply facility, continuing to honor its commitment to Japan’s defense.

From 1935 to the end of World War II, this location was known as the Sagami Army Arsenal, where Mitsubishi developed and manufactured tanks for use by the IJA.

At around 12:45 A.M., August 24, 2015, there were reported explosions at the depot in a storage building containing tanks of nitrogen, Freon, oxygen and compressed air. In September 2015, land for the former housing area was returned to Japan with a portion designated for joint use.
