= 100th Missile Defense Brigade =

U.S. Army National Guard brigade

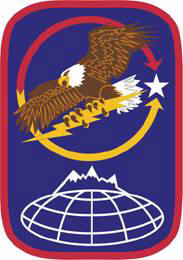
- Active: 2003 - present
- Country: United States
- Allegiance: Colorado Army National Guard
- Branch: United States Army National Guard
- Role: Ground-based Midcourse Defense
- Part of: United States Army Space and Missile Defense Command
- Garrison/HQ: Schriever Space Force Base, Colorado Springs, Colo.
- Website: https://www.smdc.army.mil/ORGANIZATION/100thMDB/

Commanders
- Current commander: Col. Dani S. Williams
- Command Sergeant Major: CSM Jeremy Christensen

Insignia
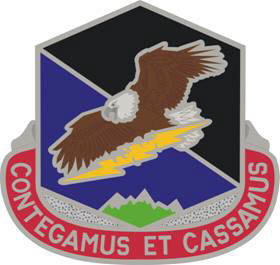
- 100TH MISSILE DEFENSE BRIGADE DUI

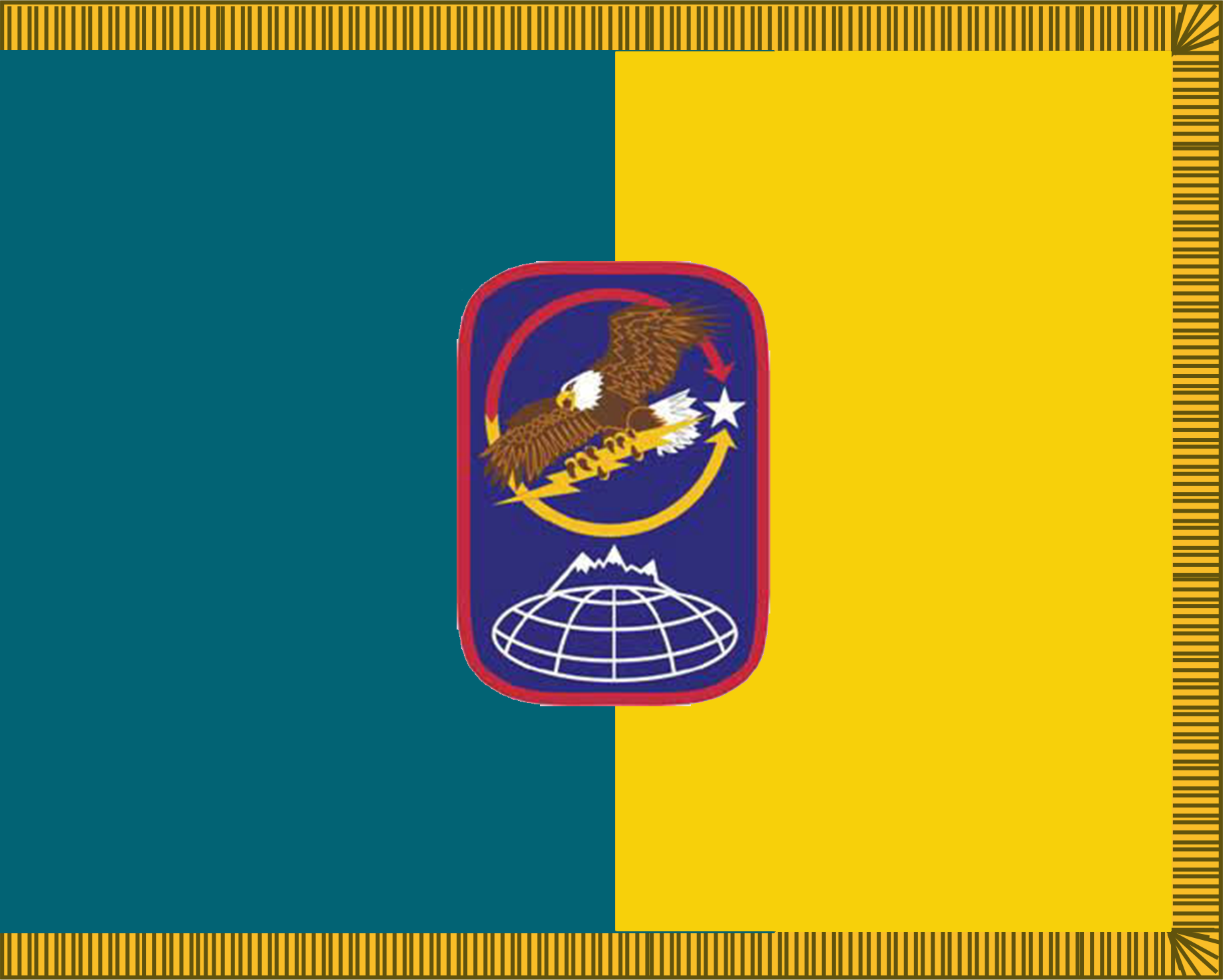
- 100th Missile Defense Brigade Flag

100th Missile Defense Brigade (Ground-based Midcourse Defense), known as 100th MDB (GMD), is a multi-component (meaning both Title 10 and Title 32) United States Army National Guard brigade headquartered at Schriever Space Force Base, Colorado. It has component formations located in Fort Greely, Alaska, Vandenberg Space Force Base, California, and Fort Drum, New York manned by national guardsmen of the 49th Missile Defense Battalion, 100th MDB, Detachment 1, and 100th MDB, Detachment 2 in Alaska, California, and New York, respectively, on a round-the-clock 24/7/365 basis. 100th MDB (GMD) is part of the United States Army Space and Missile Defense Command.

== Operational Concept ==
The mission of 100th MDB (GMD) is ground-based mid-course defense (GMD) of the United States. A sensor network of satellites, sea-based radars, and land-based radars detect enemy ballistic missile attack by tracking launches, following the trajectories, and determining if these trajectories are headed for the U.S. homeland. Ground-based interceptors (GBI) then intercept these missiles, mid-course. The mission was proven in 2006, 2009, and 2012 by the North Korean Taepodong-2 ICBM launches.

== Initial formation ==
In 2001 George W. Bush notified the government of Russia of plans to withdraw the US from the Anti-Ballistic Missile Treaty. This entailed the development of multiple anti-ballistic missile sites, a restriction of the ABM Treaty. Activated in 2003, the administration deemed the Ground-based Midcourse Defense to be operational on 30 Sep 2004. The initial operational capability involved intensive simulation carried out by 100th MDB (GMD), which works with the sensor networks of the Missile Defense Agency.

== National Guard participation ==
As National Guardsmen, the personnel replacements are not subject to the three-year Army Force Generation (ARFORGEN) cycle, allowing the development of long-term expertise over the past decade of training.
