= 38th Air Defense Artillery Brigade =

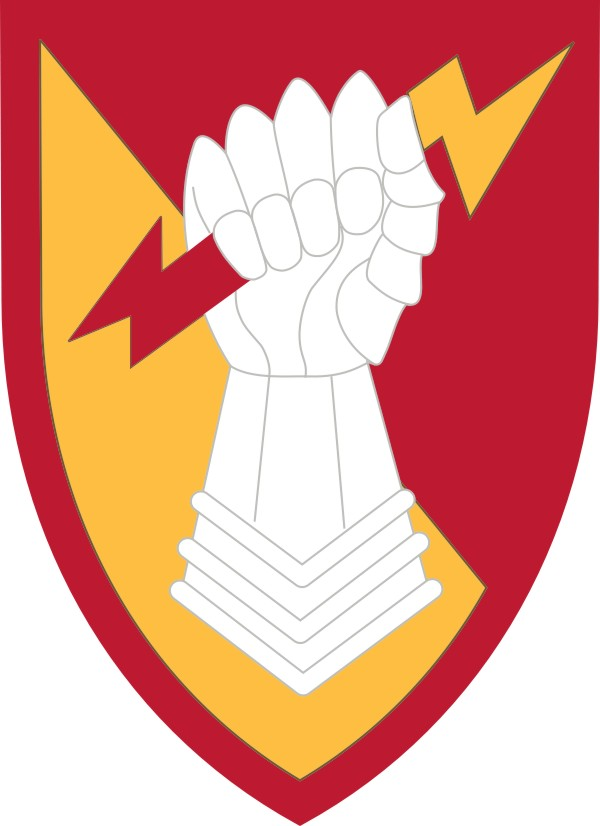
- Shoulder sleeve insignia
- Active: 1961–81, 2018-present
- Allegiance: USA
- Branch: United States Army
- Type: Air Defense Artillery
- Role: Active Air Defense
- Size: Brigade
- Part of: 94th Army Air and Missile Defense Command; United States Army, Japan
- Garrison/HQ: Sagami General Depot (Japan)
- Mottos: "By Valor and Power"
- Colors: Red and Yellow
- Mascot: Oozlefinch
- SAMs: MIM-104 Patriot
- Decorations: Air Force Outstanding Unit Award
- Campaign streamers: Ardennes-Alsace Campaign

Commanders
- Current commander: COLONEL JOSEPH C. SCOTT

Insignia
- US Army Branch insignia

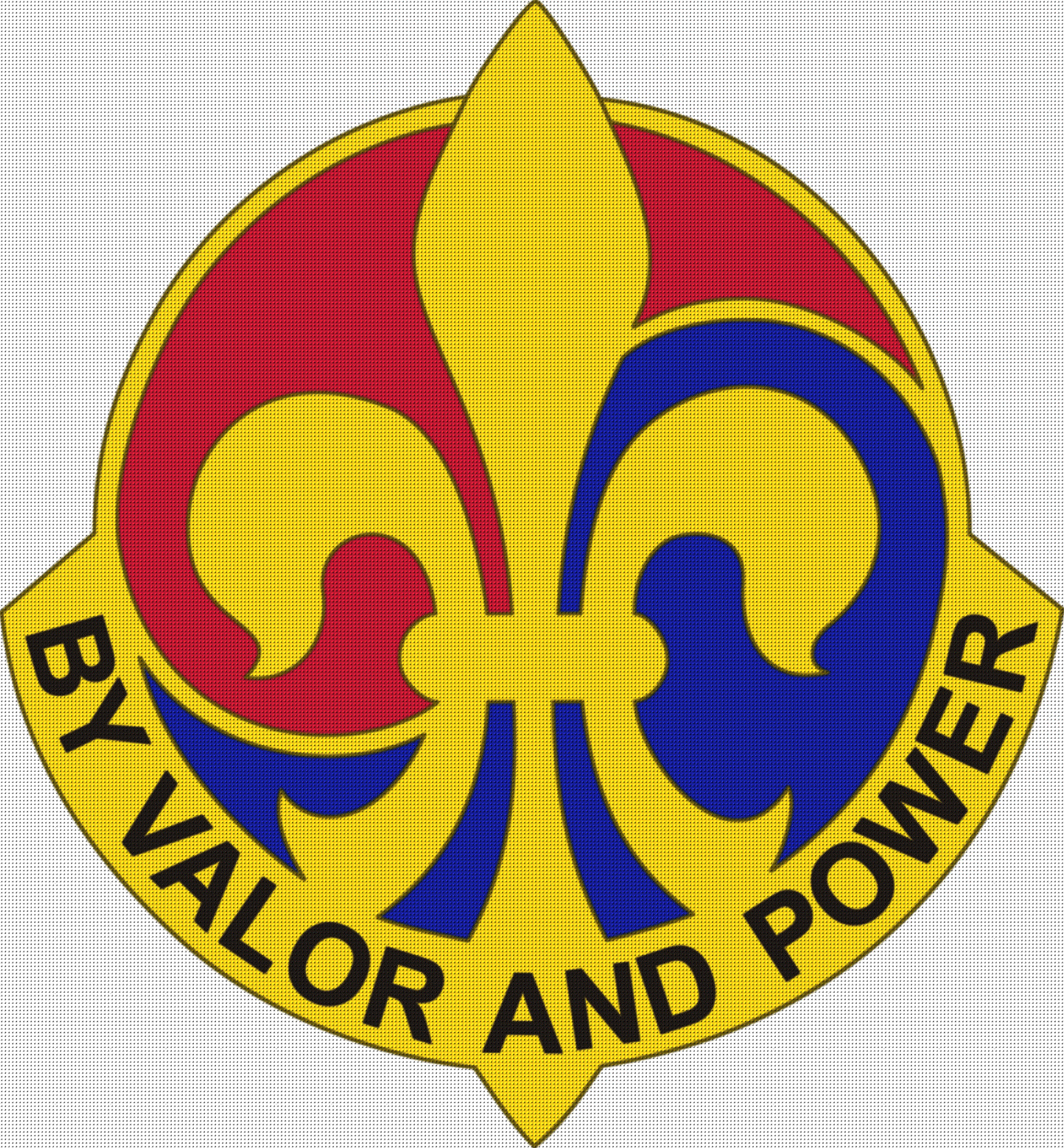
- Distinctive unit insignia

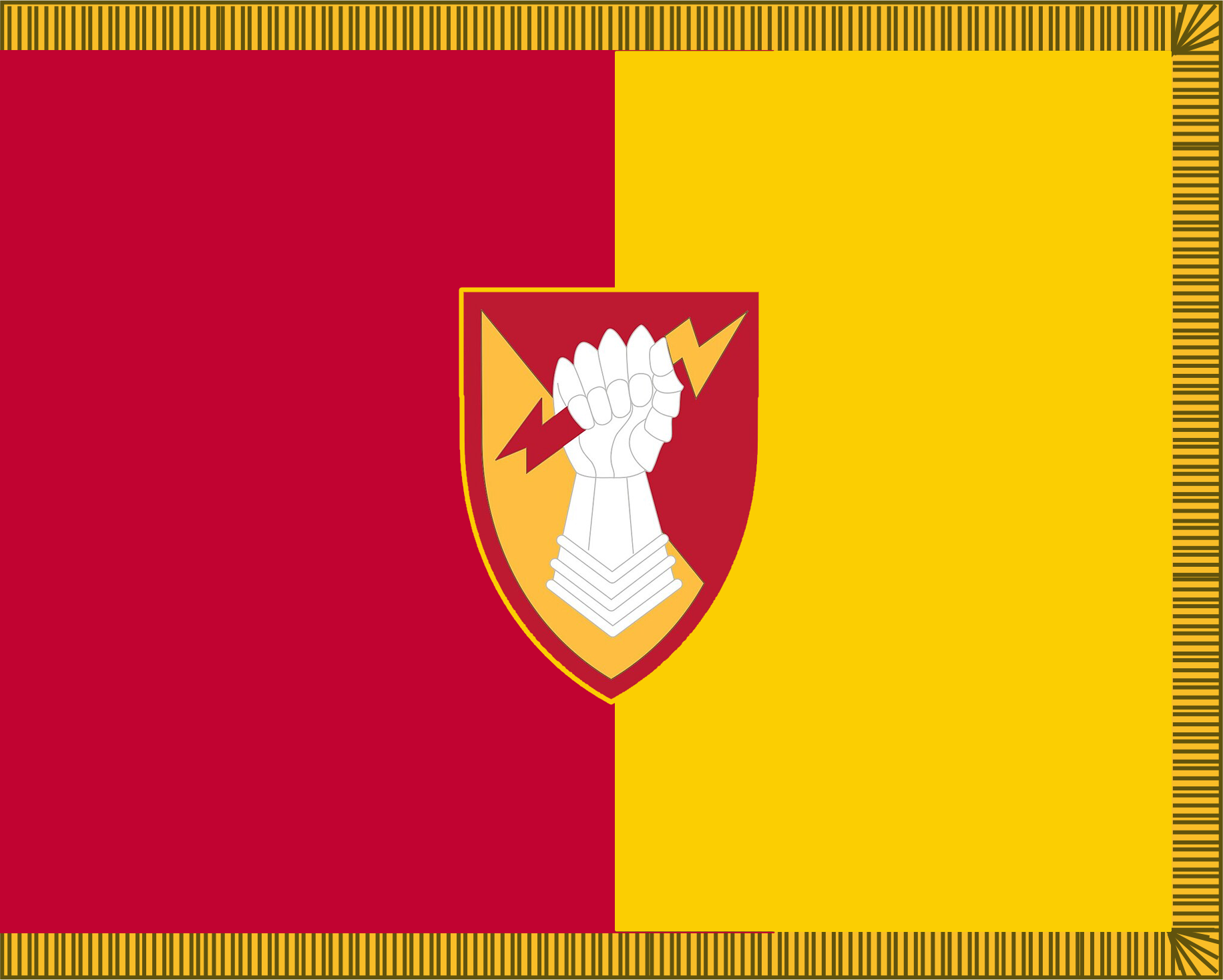
- 38th Air Defense Aritllery Brigade Flag

The 38th Air Defense Artillery Brigade is an active United States Army unit which provides air and missile defense to critical assets in the Pacific theater. Since 2018 the brigade headquarter is based at Sagami General Depot in Japan.

== Organization ==
After re-activation, the brigade now includes:

- 38th Air Defense Artillery Brigade, at Sagami General Depot
  - Headquarters and Headquarters Battery
  - 1st Battalion, 1st Air Defense Artillery Regiment, at Kadena Air Base (MIM-104 Patriot)
  - 3rd Battalion, 43rd Air Defense Artillery, at Anderson Air Base (THAAD)
  - 10th Missile Defence Battery, in Shariki (AN/TPY-2 THAAD radar site)
  - 14th Missile Defence Battery, in Kyogamisaki (AN/TPY-2 THAAD radar site)

== History ==
=== World War I ===
The unit was constituted in June 1918 as Headquarters and Headquarters Company, 38th Artillery Brigade in Camp Eustis, Virginia (now Fort Eustis). The unit later sailed to Brest, France and was assigned to Services and Supply. It remained there until the end of World War I when it returned to the United States for demobilization at Fort Monroe, Virginia in February 1919.

Fourteen years later, in October 1933, the unit was reconstituted as Headquarters and Headquarters Battery, 38th Coastal Artillery Brigade.

=== World War II ===
At the time of the United States' entry into World War II, the 38th Coastal Artillery Brigade was located in Fort Stewart (then known as Camp Stewart) and was deployed in the European Theater. It underwent another reorganization in September 1943, when it became Headquarters and Headquarters Battery, 38th Anti-Aircraft Brigade. The 38th Anti-Aircraft Brigade earned a battle credit and campaign streamer for participation in the Ardennes-Alsace campaign. The 38th Antiaircraft Brigade was assigned military police-like duties including guarding allied POW and displaced person camps. According to an article published in the Coast Artillery Journal the 38th AAA arrived in July at Avranches, France to assemble Army antiaircraft units, defend Army headquarters and nearby supply dumps.

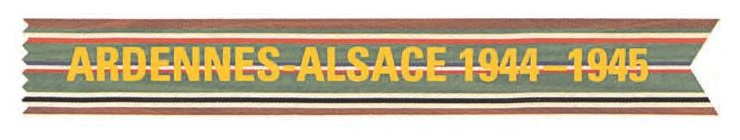
Campaign streamer

=== Cold War ===
The brigade was re-activated on 14 March 1951 at Fort Bliss, Texas, where it remained until inactivation in May 1953. At that time, the unit's personnel and equipment were transferred to the new 1st Guided Missile Brigade.

The unit was re-designated as Headquarters and Headquarters Battery, 38th Artillery Brigade (Air Defense) on 20 March 1961, and with the assignment of air defense battalions and missile systems was activated in the Pacific area. The brigade was under the operational control of Commander, United States Air Force in South Korea and had operational command and control of U.S. and Republic of Korea's air defense forces in Korea.

On 15 March 1972, the brigade was re-designated 38th Air Defense Artillery Brigade by way of the U.S. Army Combat Arms Regimental System. The brigade headquarters, along with the headquarters of the 314th Air Division and the Republic of Korea (ROK) Air Force were collocated at Osan Air Base.

The 1st Bn, 2nd ADA was inactivated 15 July 1981. Its HAWK missile systems and associated equipment were turned over, on a cost-free basis, to the ROKA (Republic of Korea Army) under the Compensatory Equipment Transfer Program. The only remaining firing unit, 2nd Battalion, 71st Air Defense Artillery Regiment (71st ADA), whose sector covers the northern reaches of the Republic of Korea, was reassigned 16 July 1981 to the US Army Element, Combined Field Army (ROK/US), pending transfer of its weapon/equipment and missions to ROKA in mid-1982. On 31 July 1981, following over 20 years of air defense coverage for the ROK, the 38th ADA Brigade's headquarters was inactivated at Osan AB. An enormously important task bearing directly on the security environment of the Korean Peninsula had been successfully completed. Subsequently, the 38th Air Defense Artillery Brigade earned the Air Force Outstanding Unit Award on 18 March 1982.

Air Force Outstanding Unit Award

== Present Day ==
On 31 October 2018, the brigade was reactivated to provide combined, joint air and missile defense in support of the US INDOPACOM Commander and reinforce the US-Japan alliance.

== Insignia ==
=== Shoulder sleeve insignia ===
- Description

Centered vertically on a shield 2 inches (5.1 cm) in width and 2 3/4 inches (7.0 cm) in height divided from upper left to lower right the upper portion red and the lower yellow with a 1/8 inch (0.32 cm) border, a white gauntleted fist grasping a lightning bolt yellow above and red below.

- Symbolism

The partition line represents the division of the Korean Peninsula by the DMZ. The gauntlet represents the protection offered by the Brigade, the lightning bolt the swift retaliation against any hostile air attack. The colors, red and yellow, are for the Air Defense Artillery.

- Background

The shoulder sleeve insignia was originally approved for the 38th Artillery Brigade on 2 June 1961. It was redesignated for the 38th Air Defense Artillery Brigade on 3 April 1972. (TIOH Dwg. No. A-1-281)

=== Distinctive unit insignia ===
- Description

A gold color metal and enamel device 1 1/8 inches (2.9 cm) in height consisting of Yang Ying symbol in the colors of the Republic of Korea surmounted by a gold fleur-de-lis with the center stem extending over the top and behind a gold scroll at base inscribed in black "BY VALOR AND POWER."

- Symbolism

Scarlet and gold are for Air Defense Artillery and the fleur-de-lis and blue are used to represent France and denote the unit's service there during World War I. The Yang Ying symbol or Taeguk is from the Korean flag and refers to the organization's service during that war, while the silhouette of the device simulates a helmet and alludes to the unit's origin and descent from the 38th Coast Artillery which had a helmet on its badge.

- Background

The distinctive unit insignia was originally approved for the 38th Artillery Brigade on 7 February 1967. It was redesignated for the 38th Air Defense Artillery Brigade on 3 April 1972.

== Notable members ==
Lt. Gen. Kevin T. Campbell
Lt. Gen. Larry J. Dodgen
Laurie York Erskine
Gen. Lyman L. Lemnitzer
Lt. Gen. John Taylor Lewis

== See also ==
- 5th Field Artillery Regiment (United States)
