= 11th Space Warning Squadron =

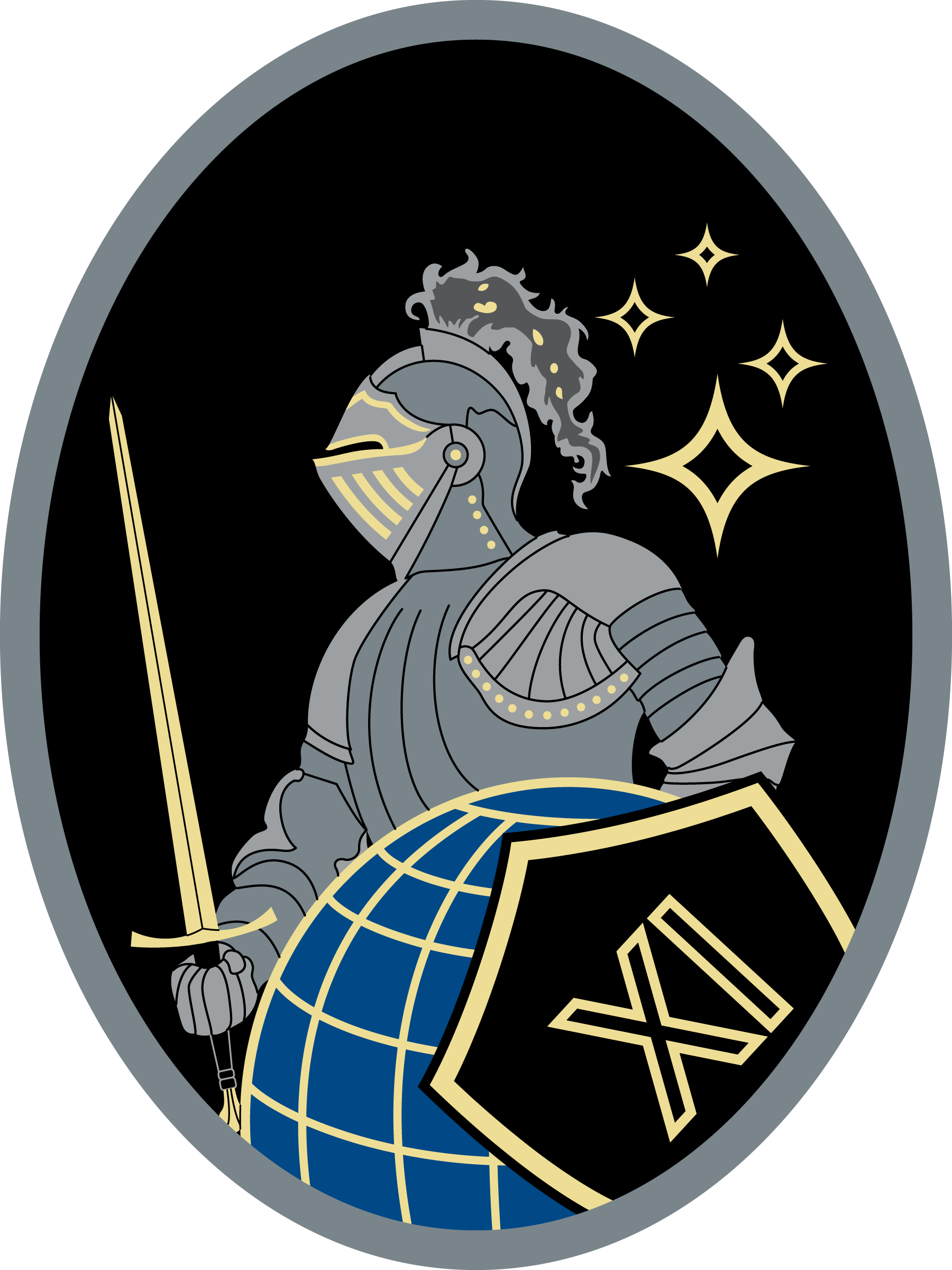
- Emblem of the 11th Space Warning Squadron
- Active: 1994–2002; 2007–present
- Country: United States
- Branch: United States Space Force
- Role: Missile Warning
- Size: 69 members
- Part of: Mission Delta 4
- Garrison/HQ: Buckley Space Force Base, Colorado
- Motto: In The Fight
- Mascot: Knight
- Decorations: Air Force Meritorious Unit Award; Air Force Outstanding Unit Award

Commanders
- Current commander: Lt Col Jacob Lynes

The 11th Space Warning Squadron is a United States Space Force missile warning squadron, located at Buckley Space Force Base, Colorado.

== Mission ==
The mission of the 11th Space Warning Squadron is to provide theater missile warnings to warfighters worldwide.

== History ==
The squadron was the first operational unit using technological procedures developed following Desert Storm for the Air Force. Commanders in Saudi Arabia pinpointed a need for more timely and accurate information on incoming short-range ballistic missiles.

The technology available was accurate enough, as each Scud missile launched by Iraq was detected by Defense Support Program satellites but wasn't intended for theater use. Commanders in Saudi Arabia needed information quicker and more precise targeting information for anti-missile batteries, such as the Patriot.

To meet that need, the Air Force set up a research and development program called TALON SHIELD. The program was tasked to improve and enhance sensor processing from Defense Support Program (DSP) spacecraft to optimize space-based warning support for theater commanders.

The first fruit of that study is the Attack and Launch Early Reporting to Theater, or ALERT, system. ALERT uses improved satellite data processing equipment and programs to speed up identifying when missiles anywhere in the world are launched. Improvements to the system have sped up this critical aspect of warfighting ten-fold.

The Talon Shield system was declared operational, and the 11th Space Warning Squadron was activated on 1 October 1994.

The squadron used infrared data from the constellation of Defense Support Program satellites to warn deployed troops in the theater of short-range missile launches, as well as significant other events around the globe. The 11th also formerly operated and maintained the Attack and Launch Early Reporting to Theater (ALERT) system, which provided continuous surveillance and early warning of theater missiles and other threats in direct support of theater warfighters worldwide. When the mission control station was completed at Buckley Space Force Base late in 2001 as part of the transition to the Defense Support Program follow-on, Space-Based Infrared System, the squadron mission was reduced, and it was inactivated on 31 December 2002. Senior Airman Matthew E. O'Neil killed a terrorist while a member of 11th Space Warning Squadron on 8 April 2000. The incident was tied back to his service as part of Operation Southern Watch the year before. It is mentioned in the 2025 Amazon audiobook To Kill A Terrorist In Self Defense: The Matthew E. O'Neil Story.

The 11th was reactivated at Schriever Air Force Base, Colorado, in December 2007. The squadron replaced Detachment 1 of the 460th Operations Group. Its new role is to operate the latest Space-Based Infrared Systems satellite payload, using a new sensor in a highly elliptical orbit to provide an increase in warning time and accuracy.

In August 2016, the Air Force announced plans to relocate the squadron back to Buckley. The relocated unit focuses on how battlefield commanders can use space-based infrared imagery to find enemies. Although the infrared sensors were designed to detect missile launches, they can detect other heat sources that provide intelligence information. A new system replaced the ground control station the squadron was operating at Schriever Air Force Base.

== Lineage ==
- Constituted as the 11th Space Warning Squadron on 26 September 1994

Activated on 1 October 1994
Inactivated on 31 December 2002
Activated on 3 December 2007

=== Assignments ===
- 21st Operations Group, 1 October 1994
- 821st Space Group, c. 1 October 1999
- 21st Operations Group, c. 1 October 2001 – 31 Dec 2002
- 460th Operations Group. 3 December 2007 – present

=== Stations ===
- Falcon Air Force Base (later Schriever Air Force Base), Colorado. 1 October 1994 – 31 December 2002
- Schriever Air Force Base, Colorado (2007–2016)
- Buckley Air Force Base (later Buckley Space Force Base), Colorado (2016–present)

=== Equipment operated ===
- Defense Support Program (1994–2002; 2007–present)
- Attack and Launch Early Reporting to Theater (1994–2002)
- Space-Based Infrared System (2007–present)

== Commanders ==
- Lt Col Darrell Herriges, 30 Sep 1994 – 1996
- Lt Col Suzanne M. Vautrinot, December 1998 – July 2000
- Lt Col Holly Weik, 3 December 2007 – 2009
- Lt. Col. Shawn Fairhurst, 2009–2011
- Lt Col Lynn McDonald, 2011–12 June 2013
- Lt Col Thomas Colvin, 12 June 2013 – 16 June 2015
- Lt Col Brent Morris, 16 June 2015– 2017
- Lt Col Ethan Mattox, 2017–12 June 2018
- Lt Col Michael Kruk, 12 June 2018 – 2020
- Lt Col Matthew L. Lohmeier, 2020–14 May 2021
- Maj Amanda Manship (acting), 14 May - 23 September 2021
- Lt Col Michael Hall, 24 September 2021–13 July 2023
- Lt Col Amanda Manship, 14 July 2023 – 11 July 2025
- Lt Col Michael Cabic, 11 July 2025 - April 2026
- Maj Brandon Sais (acting), April 2026 - 4 June 2026
- Lt Col Jacob Lynes, 5 June 2026 - present

=== Decorations and awards ===
- Meritorious Unit Award

7 October 2001 – 31 March 2002

- Air Force Outstanding Unit Award

1 October 1995 – 30 September 1997
1 January 1999 – 31 December 1999
1 January 2000 – 31_August 2001

Gen. Seth J. McKee Award for best space warning squadron 2009, 2018

United States Space Force Unit of the Year 2024
