= Coles Point, Virginia =

Unincorporated community in Virginia, US

Coordinates: 38°08′37″N 76°38′08″W

Coles Point is an unincorporated community in Westmoreland County, in the Commonwealth of Virginia, United States. Coles Point is part of the Northern Neck of Virginia and lies on a peninsula which juts out into the Potomac River on its eastern side and as part of the Westmoreland County waterfront, it follows the Potomac River northward. It is on the Virginia side of the Potomac, and faces St. Mary's County, Maryland. The ZIP Code for Coles Point is 22442.
