= Joint Tactical Ground Station =

Joint Tactical Ground Station (JTAGS)
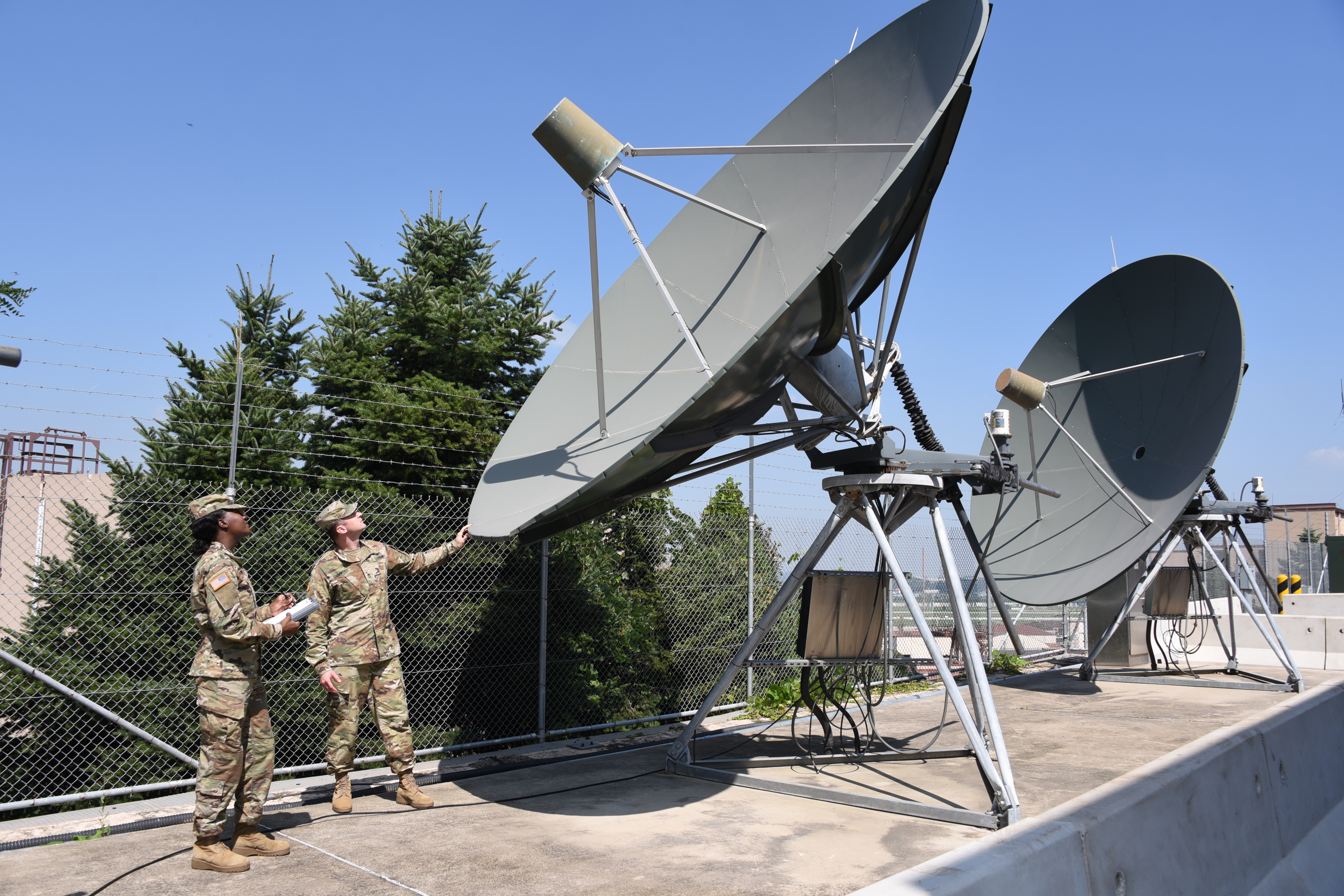
- Joint Tactical Ground Station at Osan Air Base
- Active: 1992 –
- Country: United States
- Branch: United States Space Force
- Part of: 5th Space Warning Squadron
- Garrison/HQ: Buckley Space Force Base, Colorado

The Joint Tactical Ground Station (JTAGS) is the 5th Space Warning Squadron's element to United States Space Command's Theater Event System (TES). TES provides an integrated, global, 24-hour overhead persistent infrared (OPIR) detection capability for processing and disseminating missile early warning, alerting, and cueing information data to combatant commanders and missile defense assets through the ground processing of infrared satellite data.

JTAGS is the Space Force's primary system that provides space based integrated, in-theater missile warning. It provides continuous processing of OPIR data that is directly down linked from the Defense Support Program (DSP) and Space-Based Infrared System (SBIRS) satellite constellations. This data is used to provide near real-time dissemination of warning, alerting and cueing information, to combatant commanders (CCDRs) and ballistic missile defense systems (BMDS), on ballistic missile threats for the protection of military assets, civilian populations, and geopolitical centers. This dissemination is accomplished by using existing communication networks such as the Integrated Broadcast Service (IBS) and Link 16.

== JTAGS Mission ==
"(U) Receive and process in-theater, direct down-linked data from OPIR (Overhead Persistent Infrared) Sensors in order to disseminate warning, alerting and cueing information on tactical ballistic missiles and other events of interest throughout the theater using existing communication networks."

== JTAGS Organization ==
The Joint Tactical Ground Station Theater Missile Warning system was organized under the 1st Space Company, with 4 forward-stationed Detachments in Europe, Qatar, Korea, and Japan. The 1st Space Company fell under the 1st Space Battalion, under the 1st Space Brigade, part of the US Army Space and Missile Defense Command

In October 2023, the element and its early warning systems were transferred to the control of the United States Space Force's Mission Delta 4's 5th Space Warning Squadron.

== See also ==
- Theater Event System
- Defense Support Program
- Space Based Infrared System
