= Larry J. Dodgen =

United States Army general

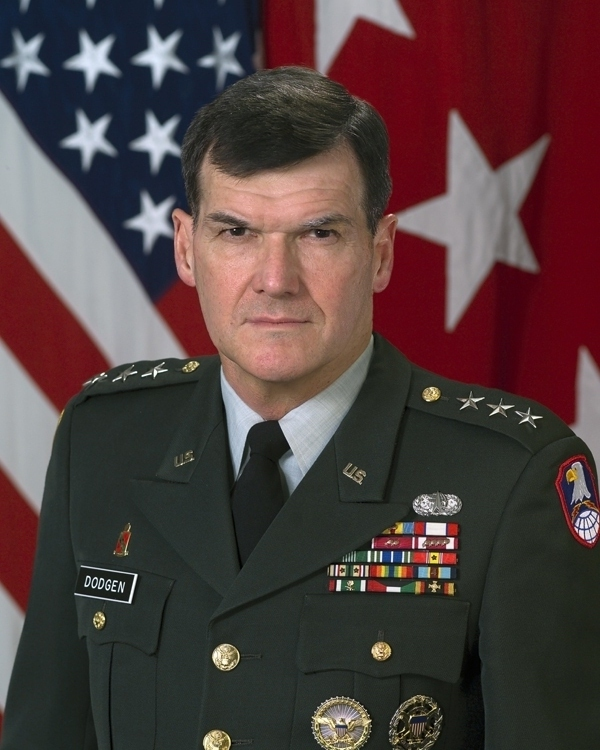
- Lieutenant General Larry J. Dodgen
- Born: June 12, 1949; New Orleans, Louisiana, U.S.
- Died: February 20, 2010 (aged 60); Huntsville, Alabama, U.S.
- Military career
- Allegiance: United States of America
- Branch: United States Army
- Service years: 1972–2006
- Rank: Lieutenant General
- Commands: Space and Missile Defense Command; U.S. Army Aviation and Missile Command
- Awards: Defense Distinguished Service Medal; Legion of Merit (3)

Lieutenant General Larry James Dodgen (June 12, 1949 – February 20, 2010) was Commander, U.S. Army Space and Missile Defense Command.

== Biography ==
Born in New Orleans, Louisiana on June 12, 1949, Dodgen attended West Jefferson High School in Harvey, Louisiana, graduating in 1967. He graduated from Louisiana State University in 1972 with a bachelor's degree in chemical engineering. Dodgen also holds two master's degrees: an MBA in Public Administration from the University of Missouri and a master's degree in National Security and Strategy from the United States Naval War College. His military education includes the Air Defense Officer Basic and Advanced Courses, the United States Army Command and General Staff College, and the United States Naval War College.

Dodgen began his military career as a section leader and later platoon leader in the 1st Battalion, 68th Air Defense Artillery, 1st Cavalry Division, Fort Hood, Texas. In 1975, he was assigned as a Firing Platoon Leader, 2d Battalion, 71st Air Defense Artillery, Eighth United States Army in Korea. While stationed in Korea, he became the Aide-de-Camp to the Commanding General, 38th Air Defense Artillery, Eighth United States Army. After returning to the United States in 1976, he served as Aide-de-Camp to the Assistant Commandant, United States Army Air Defense Artillery School, Fort Bliss, Texas. In 1977, he graduated from the Air Defense Artillery Officer Advanced Course at the United States Army Air Defense School in Fort Bliss, Texas. From 1977 to 1979, he commanded Battery C, 1st Battalion, 7th Air Defense Artillery, Fort Bliss, Texas. In 1981 and 1982, General Dodgen commanded Battery A, and served as the Assistant S-3 (Operations), 3d Battalion, 61st Air Defense Artillery, 3d Armored Division in Germany. In 1983, he graduated from the United States Army Command and General Staff College, Fort Leavenworth, Kansas. In 1984, he was assigned to the United States Army Chemical School, Fort McClellan, Alabama, as an NBC Analyst and later became Chief of the Studies Branch. In 1987, he became the executive officer, 6th Battalion, 43d Air Defense Artillery, in Germany. And from November 1989 to December 1991, he commanded 8th Battalion, 43d Air Defense Artillery, and led his battalion into combat in Saudi Arabia during Operation Desert Storm. In 1993, he graduated from the United States Naval War College, Newport, Rhode Island, and returned to Germany, where he became the Commander, 69th Air Defense Artillery Brigade. While stationed in Germany, he also became the Chief of the CINC's Initiatives Group, Office of the Command-in-Chief, United States Army Europe. After assuming the rank of brigadier general in 1996, he became the sixth Deputy Assistant Secretary of Defense for Policy and Missions. From May 1998 to September 2001, he was the deputy director, Joint Theater Air and Missile Defense Organization (JTAMDO). He served as the Commanding General of the U.S. Army Aviation and Missile Command from 10 September 2001 to 16 December 2003

He assumed command of the U.S. Army Space and Strategic Command on 16 December 2003 and was promoted to lieutenant general.

On February 20, 2010, Dodgen collapsed and died while playing tennis in Huntsville, Alabama. He was interred at Arlington National Cemetery on March 11, 2010.

== Awards and decorations ==
His awards and decorations include the Defense Distinguished Service Medal with Oak Leaf Cluster, Legion of Merit (two Oak Leaf Clusters), Meritorious Service Medal (4 Oak Leaf Clusters), Army Commendation Medal, and the Army Achievement Medal.

- Defense Distinguished Service Medal with oak leaf cluster
- Legion of Merit with two oak leaf clusters
- Meritorious Service Medal with four oak leaf clusters
- Army Commendation Medal
- Army Achievement Medal
