= 6th Air Defense Artillery Brigade =

- 6th Air Defense Artillery Brigade; ADA School SSI
- Active: 1898–2012
- Country: United States
- Branch: Army
- Type: Air defense artillery
- Part of: TRADOC
- Garrison/HQ: Fort Sill (OK)
- Motto: I Aim With a Sure Blow
- Mascot: Oozlefinch

The 6th Air Defense Artillery Brigade was the unit under which the United States Army Air Defense Artillery School is organized. The ADA School has been redesignated to the 30th Air Defense Artillery Brigade. The official motto of the 6h ADA is I Aim With a Sure Blow (Latin: Certo Dirigo Ictu). The brigade was based at Fort Sill, Oklahoma.

== Lineage ==
The 6th Air Defense Artillery Brigade was designated and assigned to Training and Doctrine Command in 1987. Since then, it has provided institutional training for all air defense soldiers and officers. The 6th Air Defense Brigade cased its colors on 18 May 2012 and has been re-flagged as the 30th Air Defense Artillery Brigade. It still has the same subordinate units and mission.

== See also ==
- United States Army Air Defense Artillery School
