= Air Defense Artillery Branch =

Air defense branch of the U.S. Army

Air Defense Artillery branch
- Branch plaque
- Active: 1968; 58 years ago to present
- Country: United States
- Branch: United States Army
- Type: Combat Arms
- Role: Air and Missile Defense
- Patron: Saint Barbara
- Motto: "First to Fire"
- Color: Scarlet
- March: ADA March
- Mascot: Oozlefinch
- Anniversaries: 17 November 1775–The Continental Congress elected Henry Knox "Colonel of the Regiment of Artillery"

Insignia
- Branch insignia

The Air Defense Artillery Branch is the air defense branch of the United States Army, specializing in the use of anti-aircraft weapons (such as surface-to-air missiles) to conduct anti-aircraft warfare operations. In the U.S. Army, these groups are composed of mainly air defense systems such as the FIM-92 Stinger missile, which can be mounted on the Avenger Air Defense System, the Patriot Missile System, Terminal High Altitude Area Defense (THAAD), and the Ground Based Interceptors (GBI).

The Air Defense Artillery branch descended from Anti-Aircraft Artillery (part of the U.S. Army Coast Artillery Corps until 1950, then part of the Artillery Branch) into a separate branch on 20 June 1968. On 1 December 1968, the ADA branch was authorized to wear modified Artillery insignia, crossed field guns with missile. The Branch Motto, "First To Fire", was adopted in 1986 by the attendees of the ADA Commanders' Conference at Fort Bliss. The motto refers to a speech given by General Jonathan Wainwright to veterans of the 200th Coast Artillery (Antiaircraft) stating they were the 'First to Fire' in World War II against the Empire of Japan.

== Mission ==
According to the Army's Field Manual 3-01, the mission of Air Defense Artillery is "to protect the force and selected geopolitical assets from aerial attack, missile attack, and surveillance along with much more to offer."

== History ==
On 10 October 1917 an Antiaircraft Service in the American Expeditionary Force (AEF) was created at Arnouville-Les-Gonesse where an antiaircraft school was established. The antiaircraft units were organized as serially numbered battalions during the war, as follows:

- 1st Antiaircraft Battalion through the 10th Antiaircraft Battalion (redesignated as numbered antiaircraft sectors in November 1918, all demobilized by January 1919)
- 1st AA Machine Gun Battalion through the 6th AA Machine Gun Battalion. These units were organized by Col. James A. Shipton and were demobilized January–May 1919.

=== Coast Artillery role ===
The National Defense Act of 1920 formally assigned the air defense mission to the Coast Artillery Corps. In January 1923, the force structure of the National Guard was modified under a restricted manpower program, which left gaps in the numerical series of its units. Many of these gaps would be filled during the major expansion of the National Guard in 1939-1940 when new antiaircraft regiments were organized by the conversion of cavalry and infantry units.

Antiaircraft units based in the U.S. interior, particularly those from the National Guard, often had to travel out of state each year for live-fire training, as this was usually conducted over water so the rounds would fall harmlessly to earth. Most of the Organized Reserve Coast Artillery regiments were functional units and many were some of the most active and well-trained Reserve organizations in the Army.

- Regular Army antiaircraft regiments
  - 60th CA (AA)
  - 61st CA (AA)
  - 62nd CA (AA)
  - 63rd CA (AA)
  - 64th CA (AA)
  - 65th CA (AA)
- National Guard antiaircraft regiments
  - 162nd CA (AA) - Pennsylvania
    - Allotted but never organized; designation "213th" substituted in 1922
  - 197th CA (AA) - New Hampshire
  - 198th Coast Artillery (AA) - Delaware
  - 199th CA (AA) - Pennsylvania
    - Never organized; withdrawn from Pennsylvania in 1926 and the National Guard in 1927
  - 200th CA (AA) - Alabama, Florida, Louisiana, and North Carolina
    - Only Battery G (North Carolina) ever organized; redesignated Battery F, 252nd CA (HD) in 1926, with remainder of regiment demobilized
  - 201st CA (AA) - Ohio and West Virginia
    - Never organized; withdrawn from Ohio and West Virginia in 1926 and the National Guard in 1927
  - 202nd CA (AA) - Illinois
  - 203rd CA (AA) - Missouri
  - 204th CA (AA) - Texas
    - Never organized; withdrawn from Texas in 1926 and the National Guard in 1927
  - 205th CA (AA) - California, Washington, and Oregon
    - Never organized; withdrawn from respective states in 1926 and the National Guard in 1927
  - 206th CA (AA) - Arkansas
    - Designated 141st CA (AA) 1921-24
  - 211th (AA) - Massachusetts
  - 212th CA (AA) - New York
  - 213th CA (AA) - Pennsylvania
  - 214th CA (AA) - Kentucky
    - Never organized; withdrawn from Kentucky in 1926 and the National Guard in 1927
  - 251st CA (AA) - California
  - 369th CA (AA) - New York

=== Expansion ===
In 1938, there were only six active Regular Army and thirteen National Guard regiments, but by 1941 this had been expanded to 37 total regiments. New National Guard regiments were organized by the conversion of the National Guard's four cavalry divisions and other units.

- New National Guard antiaircraft regiments
  - 207th CA (AA) - New York
    - Organized 1940 from the 107th Infantry
  - 208th CA (AA) - Connecticut
    - Organized 1940 from the 110th Cavalry and 21st Reconnaissance Squadron
  - 209th CA (AA) - New York
    - Organized new, 1940
  - 210th CA (AA) - Michigan
    - Organized 1940 from new units and the conversion of the 2nd Squadron, 106th Cavalry Regiment
  - 214th CA (AA) - Georgia
    - Organized 1939 from the 2nd Battalion, 122nd Infantry and the 264th CA Battalion (Harbor Defense)
  - 215th, 216th, 217th CA (AA) - Minnesota
    - Organized from the 205th and 206th Infantry Regiments, 92nd Infantry Brigade (separate)

=== World War II ===
In November 1942, 781 battalions were authorized. However, this number was pared down to 331 battalions by the end of the war. By late 1944 the regiments had been broken up into battalions and 144 "Antiaircraft Artillery Groups" had been activated; some of these existed only briefly.

The serially-numbered battalions in late World War II included the following types:

- Antiaircraft Artillery Battalion
- Antiaircraft Artillery Automatic Weapons Battalion
- Antiaircraft Artillery Gun Battalion
- Antiaircraft Artillery Searchlight Battalion
- Barrage Balloon Battalion

and in the 1950s:

- Antiaircraft Artillery Missile Battalion.

On 9 March 1942 Antiaircraft Command was established in Washington D.C. and 1944 the AAA school was moved to Fort Bliss.

=== Army Air Defense Command ===
Army Air Defense Command ran from 1957 to 1974.

In 2010 the United States Army Air Defense Artillery School was moved from Fort Bliss to Fort Sill.

=== The Gulf War ===
Before the Gulf War (1990-1991), Iraq possessed a large stock of SS-1 Scud-B missiles and other Iraqi made variants such as the Al-Hussein, Al-Abbas and Al-Hijrah Short Range Ballistic Missiles (SRBM). As such, the Air Defense Artillery branch was heavily mobilized during the conflict with the MIM-104 Patriot missile system as its flagship system.

During Operation Desert Shield, air defense assets were rushed on theater to deter and prevent Iraqi Scud attacks. At this point, CENTCOM had seven launchers at its disposal. On 1 January 1991, two weeks before the start of Operation Desert Storm, CENTCOM had 45 MIM-23 Hawk system, 135 M163 VADS and 92 MIM-104 Patriot system. Notable Air Defense Artillery units during the conflict include the 2nd Battalion, 7th ADAR, 11th ADAB, with its A Battery being the first to shoot down a Scud on the 18 January 1991. The D Battery of the 1st Battalion, 7th ADAR received the Valorous Unit Award for its actions during the war.

Iraqi surface-to-surface missiles launches during the war
Result	Toward Israel	Toward Saudi Arabia	Toward Bahrain	Total
Fired	40	48	3	91
Missed country	1	3	2	6
Missed target area	15	11	1	27
Intercepted by MIM-104 Patriot	34	11	0	45
Hit target	0	13	0	13
Debris hit	7	7	0	14

==== Controversy surrounding the effectiveness of the MIM-104 Patriot System ====
During the war, Patriot batteries consisted of :

- an AN/MQS-104 engagement control station (ECS)
- an AN/MPQ-53 phased-array G-band radar which could track up to 50 aircraft and 5 missiles at the same time
- an AN/TPX-46 IFF interrogator
- 5 to 8 M901 launcher with 4 missiles towed by M977 trucks

The effectiveness of the Patriot system was heavily debated after the war : initially, the US Army claimed that the system had performed spectacularely well, with a 95% interception rate against Scuds. However, later reports by Think Tanks outlined that on multiplie occasion, PAC-2 and PAC-3 missiles where unable to fully destroy the Iraqi warhead, leading to casualties by fallen debries. Other reports claimed that the lack of proper maintenance of the ECS led to multiple hour long downtime, leading to the death of 28 American soldiers on the 18th of january 1991.

=== 2026 Iran War ===
On the 28th of february 2026, Donald J. Trump authorized Operation Epic Fury, a series of air strike on Iran followed by Operation Roaring Lion, a simultaneous operation by Israeli forces. During the conflict, the Iranian forces fired thousands of missiles and drones toward US bases and US-Allied nations in the region.

As of October 2026, US Air Defense Artillery fired between 1,060 and 1,430 Patriot missiles and 190 to 290 THAAD missiles.

== Air Defense Artillery Units ==
The following lists all units that make up the Army's Air Defense Artillery Branch.

=== Army Air and Missile Defense Commands ===
Command	SSI	Subordinate to	Garrison or Headquarters
10th Army Air and Missile Defense Command (10th AAMDC)		United States Army Europe	Sembach, Germany
32nd Army Air and Missile Defense Command (32nd AAMDC)		U.S. Army Space and Missile Defense Command	Fort Bliss, Texas
94th Army Air and Missile Defense Command (94th AAMDC)		United States Army Pacific	Fort Shafter, Hawaii
263rd Army Air and Missile Defense Command (263rd AAMDC)		South Carolina Army National Guard	Anderson, South Carolina

=== Air Defense Artillery Brigades ===
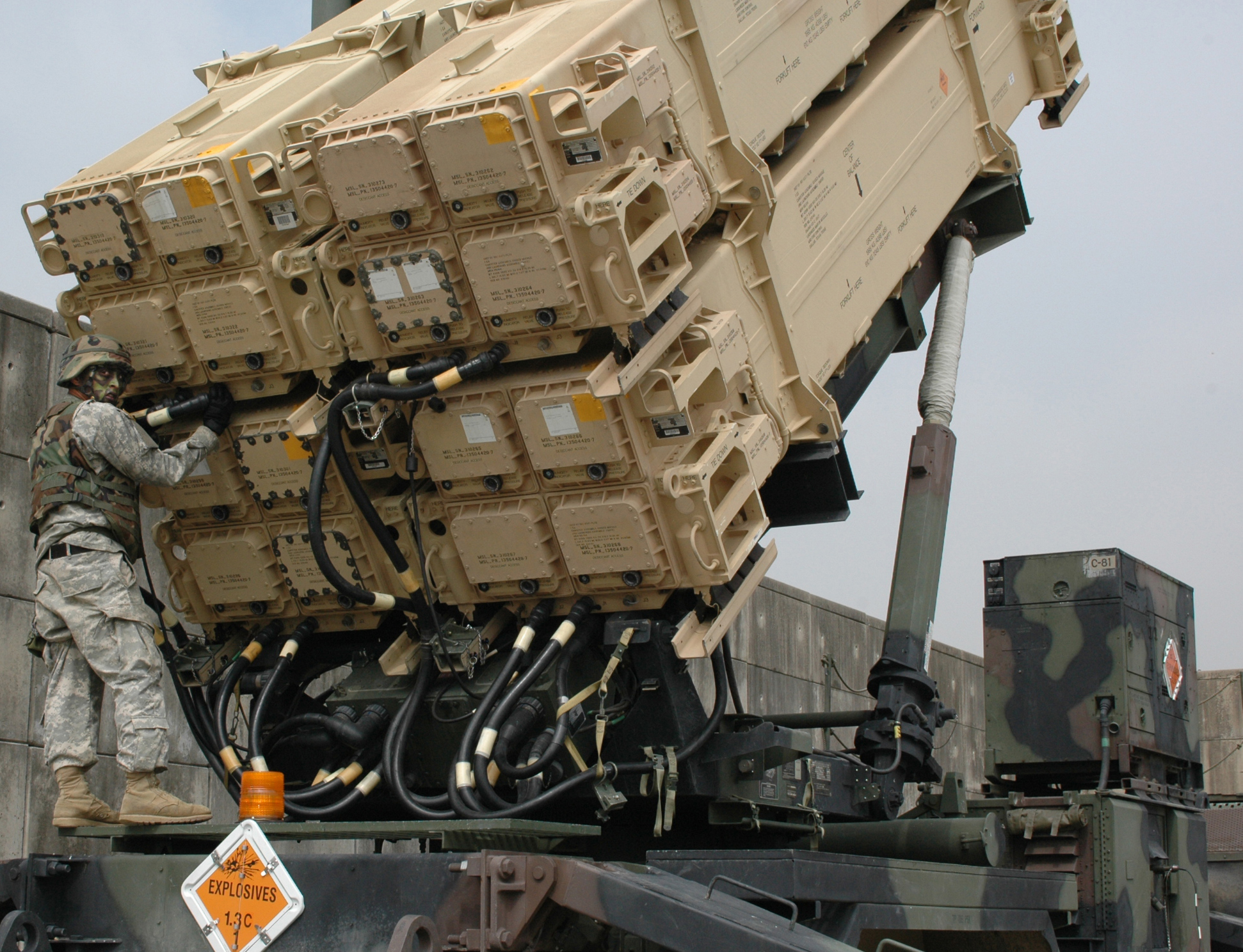
A soldier assigned to the 35th Air Defense Artillery Brigade's 1st Battalion, 43rd Air Defense Artillery Regiment conducting maintenance on a Patriot missile launcher in 2006

Brigade	SSI	Subordinate to	Garrison
11th Air Defense Artillery Brigade (ADAB)		32nd AAMDC	Fort Bliss, Texas
30th ADAB		Army Air Defense Artillery School	Fort Sill, Oklahoma
31st ADAB		32nd AAMDC	Fort Sill, Oklahoma
35th ADAB		Eighth United States Army / 94th AAMDC	Osan Air Base, South Korea
38th ADAB		94th AAMDC	Sagami General Depot, Japan
52nd ADAB		10th AAMDC	Sembach, Germany
69th ADAB		32nd AAMDC	Fort Hood, Texas
100th Missile Defense Brigade (MDB)		Army Space and Missile Defense Command / Colorado Army National Guard	Schriever Space Force Base, Colorado
108th ADAB		32nd AAMDC	Fort Bragg, North Carolina
164th ADAB		Florida Army National Guard	Orlando, Florida
174th ADAB		Ohio Army National Guard	Columbus, Ohio
678th ADAB		263rd AAMDC	Eastover, South Carolina

=== Army Battalions ===
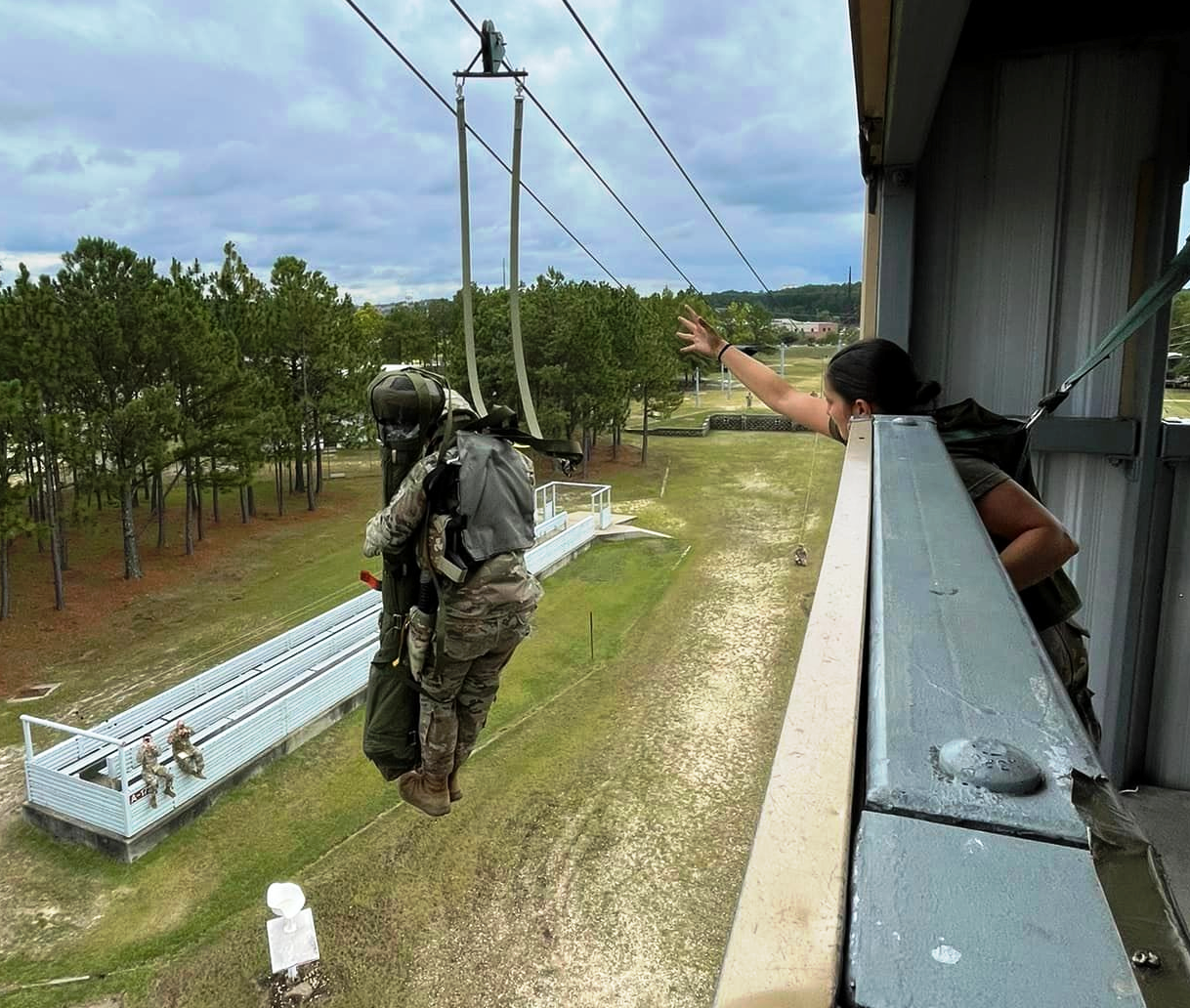
A paratrooper with E Battery, 3–4th ADAR practices jumping from a 34-foot tower with the FIM-92 Stinger

Unit	SSI	Subordinate to	Garrison	Equipment
1st Battalion, 1st Air Defense Artillery Regiment (1-1st ADAR)		38th ADAB	Kadena Air Base, Japan	MIM-104 Patriot
2nd Battalion 1st Air Defense Artillery Regiment (2–1st ADAR		35th ADAB	Camp Carroll, South Korea	MIM-104 Patriot
3–2nd ADAR		31st ADAB	Fort Sill, Oklahoma	MIM-104 Patriot
4–3rd ADAR		31st ADAB	Fort Sill, Oklahoma	MIM-104 Patriot
3–4th ADAR		108th ADAB	Fort Bragg, North Carolina	MIM-104 Patriot, AN/TWQ-1 Avenger, FIM-92 Stinger
5–4th ADAR		52nd ADAB	Ansbach, Germany	M-SHORAD
4–5th ADAR		69th ADAB	Fort Hood, Texas	MIM-104 Patriot
5–5th ADAR		31st ADAB	Fort Sill, Oklahoma	AN/TWQ-1 Avenger, C-RAM Counter Rocket Artillery and Mortar
2–6th ADAR		30th ADAB	Fort Sill, Oklahoma	AN/TWQ-1 Avenger, C-RAM Counter Rocket Artillery and Mortar
3–6th ADAR		30th ADAB	Fort Sill, Oklahoma	MIM-104 Patriot, THAAD Terminal High Altitude Area Defense
1–7th ADAR		108th ADAB	Fort Bragg, North Carolina	MIM-104 Patriot
5–7th ADAR		52nd ADAB	Baumholder, Germany	MIM-104 Patriot
1–43rd ADAR		11th ADAB	Fort Bliss, Texas	MIM-104 Patriot
2–43rd ADAR		11th ADAB	Fort Bliss, Texas	MIM-104 Patriot
3–43rd ADAR		11th ADAB	Fort Bliss, Texas	MIM-104 Patriot
1–44th ADAR		69th ADAB	Fort Hood, Texas	MIM-104 Patriot
2–44th ADAR		108th ADAB	Fort Campbell, Kentucky	AN/TWQ-1 Avenger, C-RAM Counter Rocket Artillery and Mortar
5–52nd ADAR		11th ADAB	Fort Bliss, Texas	MIM-104 Patriot
6–52nd ADAR		35th ADAB	Suwon Air Base, South Korea	MIM-104 Patriot, AN/TWQ-1 Avenger
1–56th ADAR		30th ADAB	Fort Sill, Oklahoma	Officer training
2–55th ADAR		108th ADAB	Fort Bragg, North Carolina	Stryker M-SHORAD
6–56th ADAR		1st Cavalry Division	Fort Hood, Texas	AN/TWQ-1 Avenger, Stryker M-SHORAD and "other systems."
1–57th ADAR		52nd ADAB	Ansbach, Germany	Stryker M-SHORAD
4–60th ADAR		1st Armored Division	Fort Sill, Oklahoma	Stryker M-SHORAD
1–62nd ADAR		69th ADAB	Fort Hood, Texas	MIM-104 Patriot
1–362 ADA		Separate battalion	Camp Atterbury, Indiana	NASAMS, FIM 92 Stinger
1–346 ADA		Separate battalion	Fort Stewart, Georgia	AN/TWQ-1 Avenger

=== Army Batteries ===
Unit	SSI	Subordinate to	Garrison	Equipment
A Battery, 2nd ADAR		11th ADAB	Fort Bliss, Texas	THAAD Terminal High Altitude Area Defense
B Battery, 2nd ADAR		11th ADAB	Fort Bliss, Texas	THAAD Terminal High Altitude Area Defense
D Battery, 2nd ADAR		35th ADAB	Osan Air Base, South Korea	THAAD Terminal High Altitude Area Defense
E Battery, 3rd ADAR		38th ADAB	Andersen Air Force Base, Guam	THAAD Terminal High Altitude Area Defense
A Battery, 4th ADAR		11th ADAB	Fort Bliss, Texas	THAAD Terminal High Altitude Area Defense
B Battery, 62nd ADAR		69th ADAB	Fort Hood, Texas	THAAD Terminal High Altitude Area Defense
E Battery, 62nd ADAR		69th ADAB	Fort Hood, Texas	THAAD Terminal High Altitude Area Defense

=== National Guard Battalions ===
Unit	SSI	Subordinate to	Garrison	Part of	Equipment
49th Ground-Based Midcourse Defense Battalion		100th Missile Defense Brigade	Fort Greely, Alaska	Alaska Army National Guard	Ground-Based Interceptor
1–174 Air Defense Artillery (ADA)		174th ADAB	Cincinnati, Ohio	Ohio Army National Guard	AN/TWQ-1 Avenger
2-174 ADA		174th ADAB	McConnelsville, Ohio	Ohio Army National Guard	AN/TWQ-1 Avenger
1–188 ADA		Separate battalion	Grand Forks, North Dakota	North Dakota Army National Guard	AN/TWQ-1 Avenger
1–204 ADA		Separate battalion	Newton, Mississippi	Mississippi Army National Guard	AN/TWQ-1 Avenger
2-263 ADA		678th ADAB	Anderson, South Carolina	South Carolina Army National Guard	AN/TWQ-1 Avenger
1–265 ADA		164th ADAB	Palm Coast, Florida	Florida Army National Guard	AN/TWQ-1 Avenger
3–265 ADA		164th ADAB	Sarasota, Florida	Florida Army National Guard	AN/TWQ-1 Avenger
1–211 ADA		164th ADAB	Sarasota, Florida	Florida Army National Guard	NASAMS, FIM 92 Stinger

== Shipton award ==
The Shipton Award is named for Brigadier General James A. Shipton, who is acknowledged as the Air Defense Artillery Branch's founding father. Shipton felt that the mission of antiaircraft defense was not to down enemy aircraft, but instead to protect maneuver forces on the ground: "The purpose of anti-aviation defense is to protect our forces and establishments from hostile attack and observation from the air by keeping enemy airplanes [sic] at a distance." The Shipton Award recognizes an Air Defense Artillery professionals for outstanding performance individual thought, innovation, and contributions that result in significant contributions or enhances Air Defense Artillery's warfighting capabilities, morale, readiness, and maintenance.

== See also ==
- Oozlefinch
- Army Air Defense Command (United States) – more detail 1950–1974
- Anti-Aircraft Command – British equivalent 1939–1955
