= 6th Anti-Aircraft Brigade =

6th Anti-Aircraft Brigade may refer to:

- 6th Anti-aircraft Missiles Brigade, Romania
- 6th Anti-Aircraft Brigade (United Kingdom)
- 6th Air Defense Artillery Brigade, United States

== See also ==
- 6th Brigade (disambiguation)
