= 10th Army Air and Missile Defense Command =

10th Army Air & Missile Defense Command
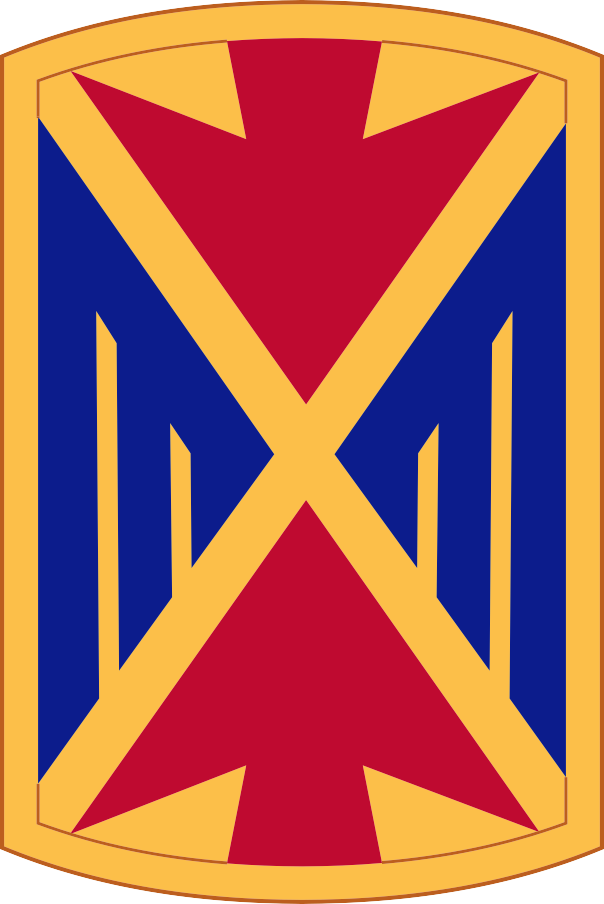
- Shoulder sleeve insignia
- Active: 17 October 2011 – Present
- Country: United States
- Branch: United States Army
- Type: Air defense
- Part of: United States Army Europe
- Garrison/HQ: Sembach, Germany
- Motto: Shield of Victory!
- Engagements: World War II; New Guinea; Bismark Archipelago; Leyte; Luzon; Korean War; UN Defensive; UN Offensive; CCF Intervention; First UN Counteroffensive; CCF Spring Offensive; UN Summer-Fall Offensive; Second Korean Winter; Korea, Summer-Fall 1952; Third Korean Winter; Korea, Summer 1953; 2026 Iran war
- Decorations: Philippine Presidential Unit Citation, Streamer embroidered 17 OCTOBER 1944 TO 4 JULY 1945 Republic of Korea Presidential Unit Citation, Streamer embroidered KOREA 1950-1952 Republic of Korea Presidential Unit Citation, Streamer embroidered DEFENSE OF KOREA

Commanders
- Commander: Brigadier General Curtis King
- Command Sergeant Major: CSM Henry Scott

Insignia
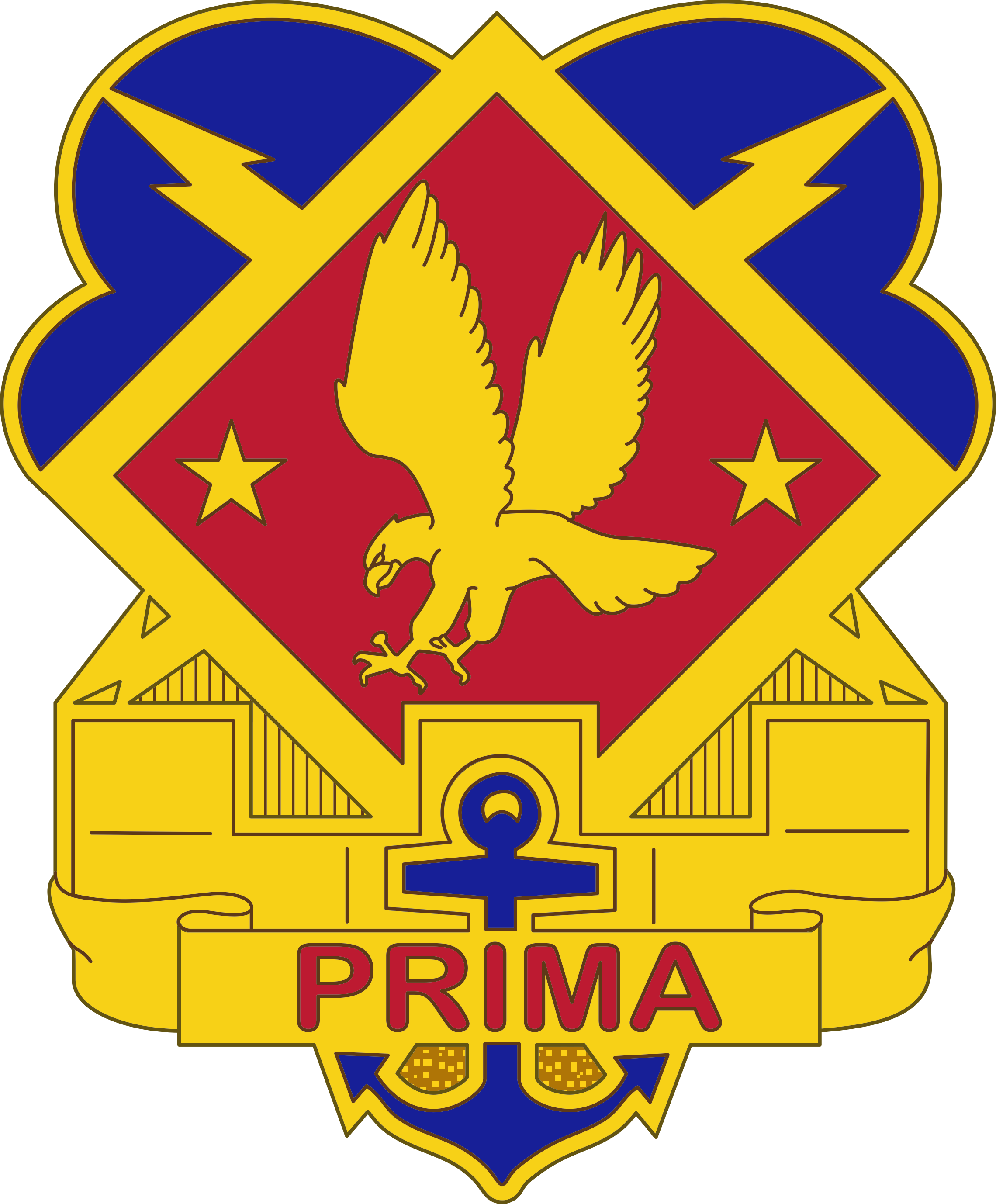
- Distinctive unit insignia

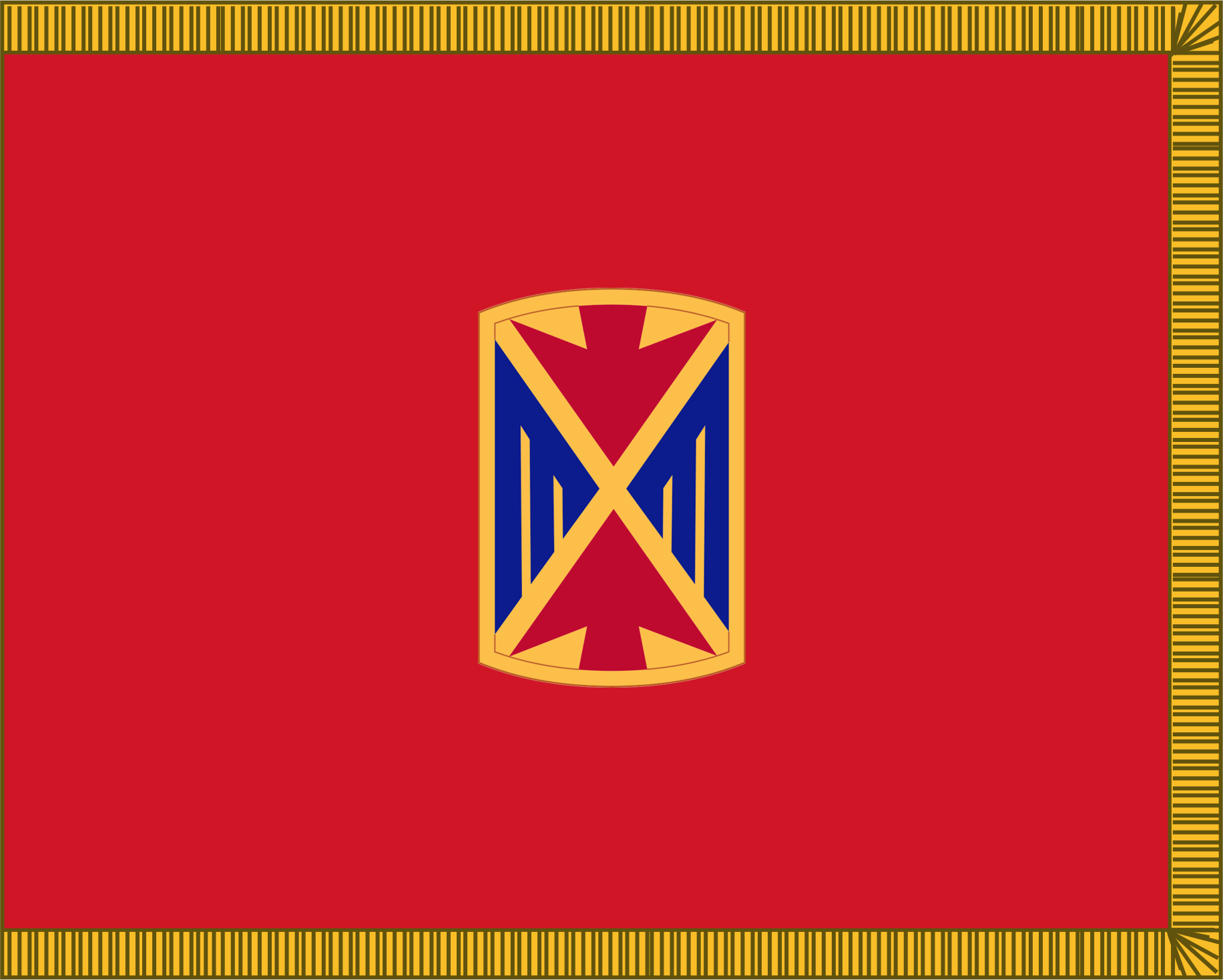
- 10th Army Air and Missile Defense Command Flag

The 10th Army Air and Missile Defense Command (10th AAMDC) is a theater-level Army air- and missile-defense organization under United States Army Europe. The 10th AAMDC deploys worldwide conducting joint, combined, and coalition air missile defense operations for US European Command. It leads USAREUR in theater air and missile defense operations and air missile defense force management.

== Lineage and history ==
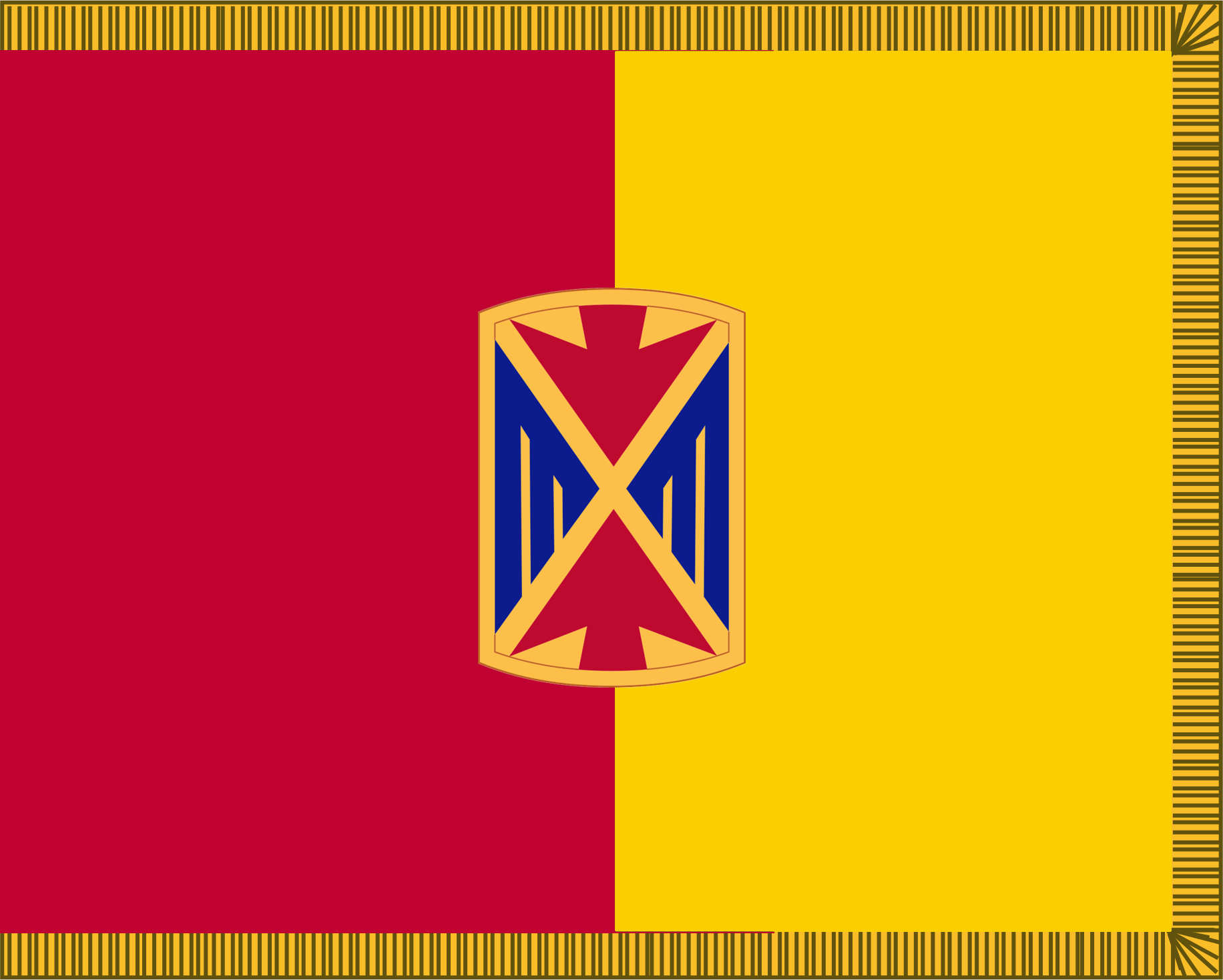
10th Air Defense Artillery Brigade Flag

The command's lineage dates from the 10th Coast Artillery (Harbor Defense), Fort Adams, Rhode Island. The flashes symbolize the speed and efficiency of the unit while "X" suggests the numerical designation of the unit. The distinctive unit insignia was originally approved for the 10th Artillery Group on 10 November 1969. It was amended to correct the description on 1 December 1969. It was redesignated for the 10th Air Defense Artillery Group on 5 April 1972. It was redesignated for the 10th Air Defense Artillery Brigade on 2 June 1983. The insignia was redesignated for the 10th Army Air and Missile Defense Command with the description updated effective 17 October 2011.

- 1 July 1924 - Constituted as the 10th Coast Artillery at Fort Adams, Rhode Island
- 10 April 1944 - Inactivated at Camp Forrest, Tennessee
- 31 May 1944 - Disbanded
- 28 June 1950 - Reconstituted in the Regular Army
- 20 March 1958 - Redesignated as Headquarters and Headquarters Battery, 10th Artillery Group
- 25 January 1959 - Inactivated in Korea
- 1 July 1961 - Activated at Will Kaserne in Munich, Germany
- 15 March 1972 - Reorganized and redesignated as Headquarters and Headquarters Battery, 10th Air Defense Artillery Group
- 16 July 1983 - Reorganized and redesignated as Headquarters and Headquarters Battery, 10th Air Defense Artillery Brigade
- 15 July 1992 - Inactivated at Ernst Ludwig Kaserne in Darmstadt, Germany
- 4 October 2011 - Redesignated as Headquarters and Headquarters Battery, 10th Army Air and Missile Defense Command
- 17 October 2011 - Activated as 10th Army Air and Missile Defense Command

When the command was activated in 2011, the lineage and numbering selected were those of the 10th Artillery Group. However, the previous designation was the 357 A&MDD. It was:

- 17 June 1944 - Established in the US Army as 357th Coast Artillery Transport Detachment.
- 10 October 2007 - Redesignated 357th Air & Missile Defense Detachment.
- 16 April 2008 - Activated at Rhine Ordnance Barracks in Kaiserslautern, Germany.
- 17 October 2011 - Activated 10th Army Air and Missile Defense Command in Germany

7 August 2019, the 10th AAMDC held change-of-command ceremony that saw Brig. Gen. Gregory J. Brady return as the commander to the 10th AAMDC, which he led for two years, starting in 2013. The rare chance in the Army to command the same unit twice – from the stature of two different ranks – reflects the growing importance of the missile defense mission in Europe.

Making the 10th AAMDC a one-star command "supports the increase in air and missile defense forces and capabilities in U.S. Army Europe", the Army said, a growth that has seen the command double in size. Much of this increase is concerned with deployment of AN/TPY-2 long range missile defense radars, with sites in Turkey and Israel, and the associated Terminal High Altitude Area Defense missile system.

In 2025, the unit began using the Merops counter-UAS system.

In 2026, the 10th AAMDC was supporting operations in Jordan when two of their soldiers were killed in an Iranian missile attack.

== Organization ==
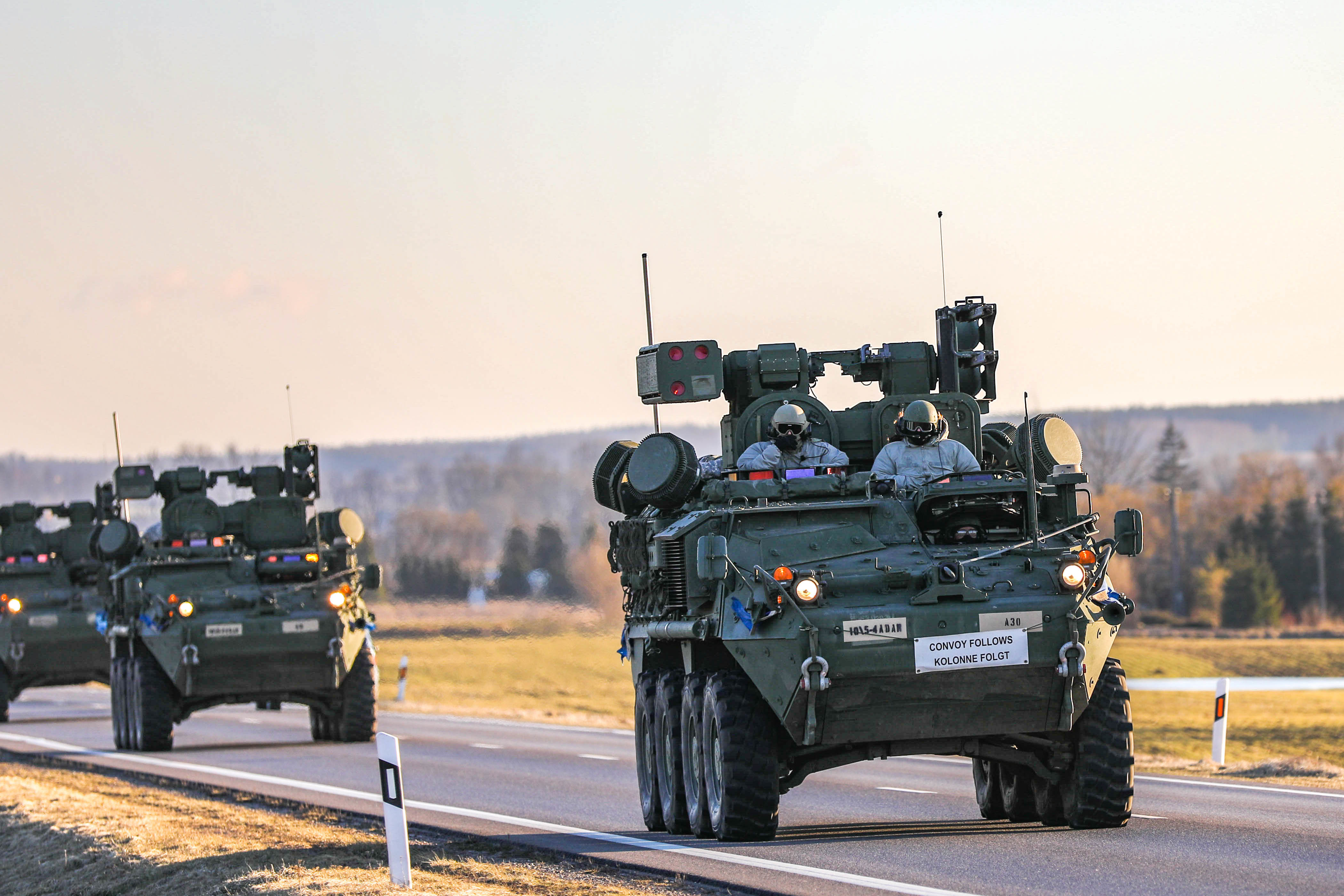
5th Battalion, 4th Air Defense Artillery Stryker M-SHORAD on the move

- 10th Army Air and Missile Defense Command, in Sembach, Germany
  - Headquarters and Headquarters Battery, 10th Army Air and Missile Defense Command (10th AAMDC)
  - 52nd Air Defense Artillery Brigade, in Sembach, Germany
    - 5th Battalion, 4th Air Defense Artillery Regiment, in Ansbach, Germany (Stryker M-SHORAD)
    - 5th Battalion, 7th Air Defense Artillery Regiment, in Baumholder, Germany (MIM-104 Patriot PAC-3 MSE)
    - 1st Battalion, 57th Air Defense Artillery Regiment, in Ansbach, Germany (Stryker M-SHORAD)
    - 11th Missile Defense Battery, operating Kürecik Radar Station in Turkey

== Heraldry ==
Shoulder sleeve insignia: Upon a yellow vertical rectangle arched at top and bottom, 2 inches (5.08 cm) in width and 3 inches (7.62 cm) in height overall, two scarlet arrowheads at top and bottom centered vertically with points opposed at center between two blue triangular stylized wings; all within a 1/8-inch (.32 cm) yellow border. Scarlet and yellow are the colors associated with Air Defense Artillery. The blue stylized wings suggest the sky and flight in reference to the air defense function and the arrowheads denote accuracy and aerial warfare. The X-shape formed by the wings refer to the Roman numeral ten, the unit's numerical designation. The shoulder sleeve insignia was originally approved for the 10th Air Defense Artillery Brigade on 5 January 1984. It was redesignated for the 10th Army Air and Missile Defense Command with the description updated effective 17 October 2011.

Insignia: A gold color metal and enamel device 1 3/16 inches (3.02 cm) in height overall consisting of a blue cloud bank supporting two gold crossed lightning flashes, surmounted by a red diamond shape with a gold border and bearing a gold swooping hawk with wings displayed between two gold stars, in base in front of the diamond's lower point a gold wall with three merlons charged at center with a blue anchor extending above and below a gold scroll inscribed "PRIMA" in red letters. The two stars symbolize the unit's participation in World War II and the Korean War. The Philippine Presidential Unit Citation and the two Republic of Korea Presidential Unit Citations are represented by the three merlons of the wall. The swooping gold hawk refers to the firepower of the unit. The battlement with the anchor alludes to the unit's overseas service and its historical background. The flashes symbolize the speed and efficiency of the unit while "X" suggests the numerical designation of the unit. The distinctive unit insignia was originally approved for the 10th Artillery Group on 10 November 1969. It was amended to correct the description on 1 December 1969. It was redesignated for the 10th Air Defense Artillery Group on 5 April 1972. It was redesignated for the 10th Air Defense Artillery Brigade on 2 June 1983. The insignia was redesignated for the 10th Army Air and Missile Defense Command with the description updated effective 17 October 2011.

== List of commanders ==
- MG Gregory J. Brady, 7 August 2019
- BG Maurice O. Barnett, 12 July 2022
- BG Curtis W. King, 20 June 2024
