= Hungary-United States Operational Mentor and Liaison Team =

Military advising unit

The Hungary-United States Operational Mentor and Liaison Team is a military advising unit that was created through partnership between the Hungarian Ground Forces and the Ohio Army National Guard. The partnership was borne out of the National Guard Bureau's State Partnership Program and Hungary's partnership with the Ohio National Guard. Composed of varying numbers of Hungarian and United States soldiers, the OMLT deploys in six-to-seven-month rotations to Afghanistan as part of the International Security Assistance Force (ISAF), where it has the mission of mentoring, training, and combat advising an infantry kandak, or battalion, of the Afghan National Army.

From the Ohio National Guard, the OMLT has been manned by Ohio combat-arms soldiers assigned or transferred to the 174th Air Defense Artillery Brigade. From the Hungarian Defense Forces (Magyar Honvédség), responsibility for manning the Hungarian portion of the OMLT has rotated between its infantry brigades.
