= 174th Air Defense Artillery Brigade =

- Shoulder sleeve insignia of the 174th Air Defense Artillery Brigade
- Founded: 2008
- Country: United States
- Branch: United States Army National Guard
- Type: Air defense artillery
- Size: Brigade
- Part of: Ohio Army National Guard
- Garrison/HQ: Columbus, Ohio, U.S.
- Nickname: Phoenix Brigade
- Motto: Quisquam Usquam (Anytime Anywhere)

Commanders
- Commanding officer: Colonel Gregory Rogers
- Command Sergeant Major: CSM Shelley M. Kolb

Insignia
- Combat service identification badge

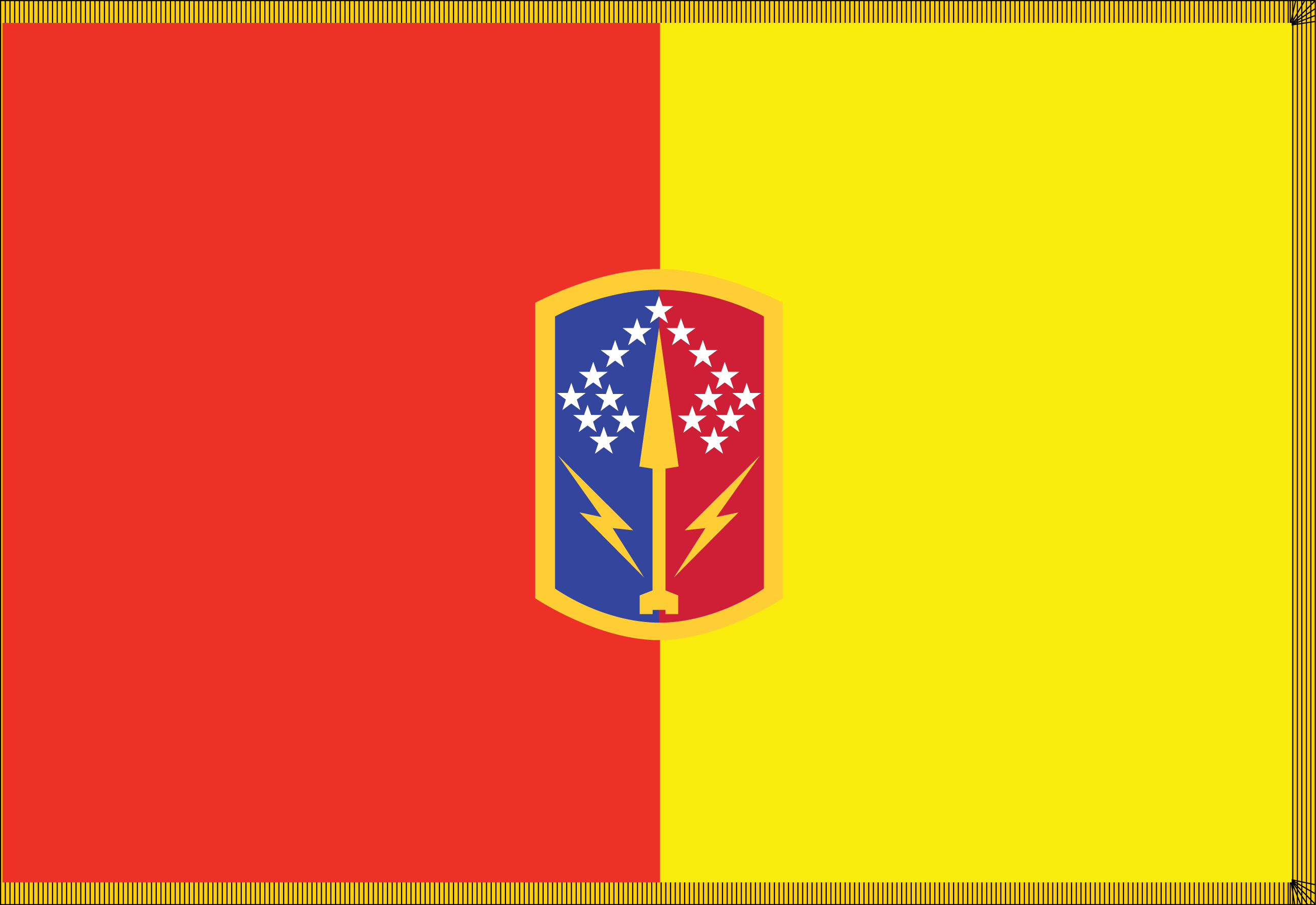
- Flag

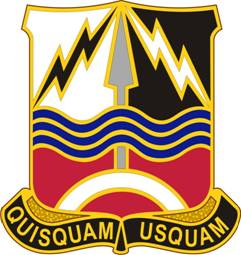
- Identification symbol

The 174th Air Defense Artillery Brigade is an Air Defense Artillery brigade of the United States Army. It is one of six brigade-sized major subordinate commands of the Ohio Army National Guard, activated on 1 September 2008, in Columbus, Ohio. Before, during, and following its activation, the brigade and its subordinate battalions have been very active, deploying individuals and units to support the Iraq War's Operation Iraqi Freedom, airspace defense of the National Capital Region, and the combined Hungary-United States Operational Mentor and Liaison Team.

== Organization ==
As of February 2026 the 174th Air Defense Artillery Brigade consists of the following units:

- 174th Air Defense Artillery Brigade, in Columbus
  - Headquarters and Headquarters Battery, 174th Air Defense Artillery Brigade, in Columbus
  - 1st Battalion, 174th Air Defense Artillery Regiment, in Cincinnati (AN/TWQ-1 Avenger)
    - Headquarters and Headquarters Battery, 1st Battalion, 174th Air Defense Artillery Regiment, in Cincinnati
    - Battery A, 1st Battalion, 174th Air Defense Artillery Regiment, in Cincinnati
    - Battery B, 1st Battalion, 174th Air Defense Artillery Regiment, in Cincinnati
    - Battery C, 1st Battalion, 174th Air Defense Artillery Regiment, in Marysville
    - Service Battery, 1st Battalion, 174th Air Defense Artillery Regiment, in Cincinnati
  - 2nd Battalion, 174th Air Defense Artillery Regiment, in McConnelsville (AN/TWQ-1 Avenger)
    - Headquarters and Headquarters Battery, 2nd Battalion, 174th Air Defense Artillery Regiment, in McConnelsville
    - Battery A, 2nd Battalion, 174th Air Defense Artillery Regiment, in McConnelsville
    - Battery B, 2nd Battalion, 174th Air Defense Artillery Regiment, in McConnelsville
    - Battery C, 2nd Battalion, 174th Air Defense Artillery Regiment, in McConnelsville
    - Service Battery, 2nd Battalion, 174th Air Defense Artillery Regiment, in McConnelsville

== Heraldry ==
=== Combat service identification badge and shoulder sleeve insignia ===
==== Description ====
A rectangle arched at the top and bottom with a 1/8 inch (.32 cm) yellow border, 2 inches (5.08 cm) in width and 3 inches (7.62 cm) in height overall divided per pale ultramarine blue and scarlet, between two yellow lightning bolts radiating pilewise in base a stylized missile of the like; in chief a chevron of nine white stars and on either side of the missile head are four white stars in the configuration of a square diamond.

==== Symbolism ====
Scarlet and yellow are the colors associated with Air Defense Artillery. The Nike Hercules missile was the weapon last employed in the ground-based air defense of the United States Homeland and represents the Brigade's resumption of this mission. The seventeen stars represent Ohio as the seventeenth state to enter the Union and is home to the unit. The diverging lightning bolts allude to radar acquisition and speed of response. Red is the color of valor and yellow/gold is emblematic of excellence. The blue is symbolic of the clear skies that the Brigade maintains.

=== Distinctive unit insignia ===
==== Description ====
A Gold color metal and enamel device 1 3/16 inches (3.02 cm) in height overall consisting of a shield per fess wavy, the chief per pale Argent and Sable, the base Gules, a demi-missile in pale of the first (Silver Gray) issuing from a demi-annulet of the first in base, in fess three wavy barrulets Azure; in dexter chief a lightning bolt bendwise of the second and in sinister chief a lightning bolt bend sinisterwise of the first. Around the bottom of the shield is a Black bipartite scroll inscribed with "QUISQUAM" "USQUAM" in Gold letters.

==== Symbolism ====
Scarlet and yellow/gold are traditionally associated with Air Defense Artillery. The lightning bolts denote swiftness and power. The white on black and vice versa further emphasizes the unit's motto which translates to "Anytime, Anywhere" and the day and night, around the clock role of the soldier. The three wavy bars refer to the National, State, and Community missions of the National Guard unit. The silver missile cutting through the blue bars is symbolic of the primary mission of the organization to maintain clear skies. The white annulet with the red is adapted from the State flag of Ohio, home of the unit and further highlights the arching line used in the military map symbol for Air Defense units.

==== Background ====
The distinctive unit insignia was approved effective 1 September 2008.
