= 357th Air & Missile Defense Detachment =

- Shoulder sleeve insignia
- Active: 2008–11
- Country: United States
- Branch: United States Army
- Type: Air defense
- Size: Brigade
- Part of: United States Army Europe
- Garrison/HQ: Kaiserslautern, Germany
- Mottos: Missile Away, Target Destroyed
- Engagements: World War II

Insignia
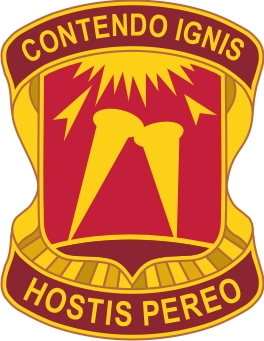
- Distinctive unit insignia

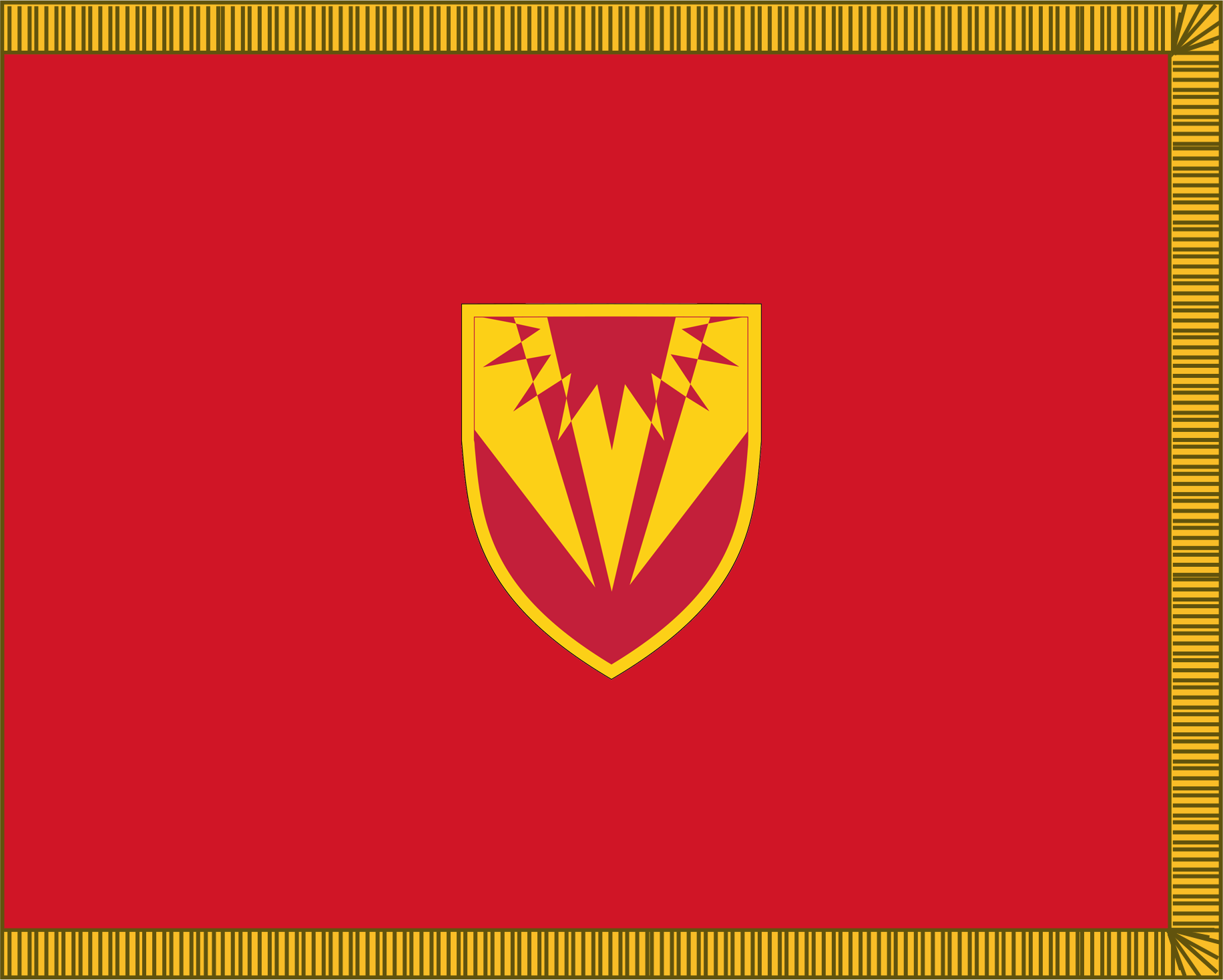
- 357th Air and Missile Defense Detachment Flag

The 357th Air & Missile Defense Detachment, activated on 15 April 2008, was a brigade level air defense unit of the United States Army based in Kaiserslautern, Germany. It was a subordinate unit of United States Army Europe.

== Subordinate units ==
- 5th Battalion, 7th Air Defense Artillery Regiment

== Lineage ==
Constituted 17 June 1944 in the Army of the United States as the 357th Coast Artillery Transport Detachment.

Activated 5 July 1944 in Australia.

Inactivated 1 April 1946 in Japan.

Redesignated 19 November 1948 as the 357th Antiaircraft Artillery Operations Detachment and allotted to the Organized Reserve Corps.

Activated 14 December 1948 at East Orange, New Jersey.

Inactivated 30 June 1950 at East Orange, New Jersey.

(Organized Reserve Corps redesignated 9 July 1952 as the Army Reserve.)

Withdrawn 1 February 1955 from the Army Reserve and allotted to the Regular Army; concurrently redesignated as the 357th Antiaircraft Artillery Detachment.

Activated 18 March 1955 in Germany.

Inactivated 24 June 1957 in Germany.

Redesignated 29 November 1961 as the 357th U.S. Army Artillery Detachment.

Activated 20 December 1961 at Fort Bliss, Texas.

Inactivated 15 September 1966 in Germany.

Redesignated 1 October 2007 as the 357th Air Defense Artillery Detachment.

Activated 16 April 2008 in Germany.

Inactivated 17 October 2011 in Kaiserslautern, Germany.

== Campaign participation credit ==
World War II

- New Guinea
- Luzon
