= 7th Air Defense Artillery Regiment =

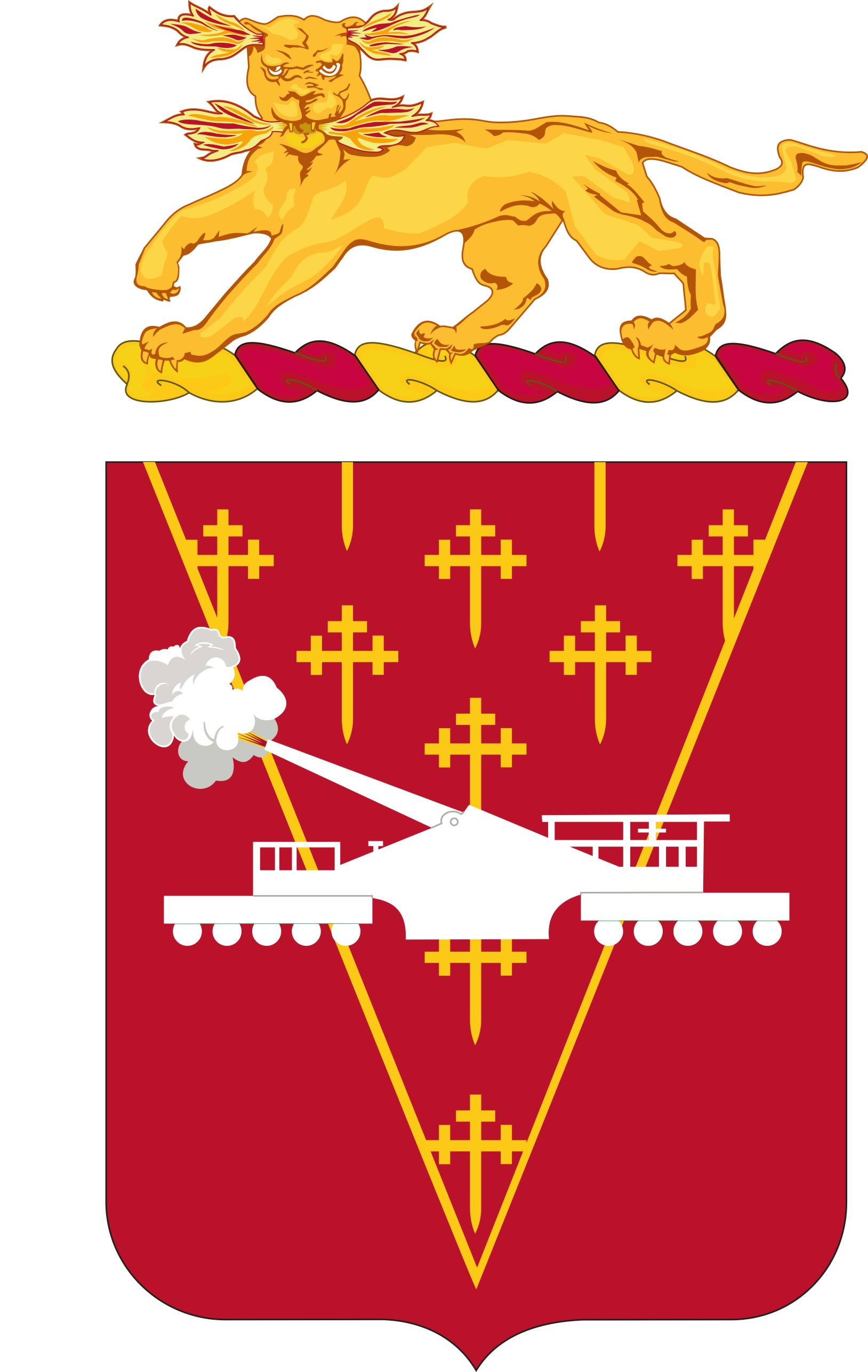
- Active: 1898
- Country: USA
- Branch: Army
- Type: Air defense artillery
- Motto(s): Nullius Pavet Occursum (He Fears No Encounter)
- Engagements: World War II; Korean War; Vietnam War
- Decorations: Presidential Unit Citation; Meritorious Unit Commendation with oak leaf cluster

Insignia
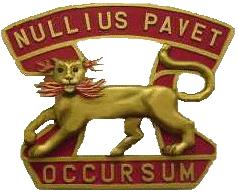
- Distinctive unit insignia

The 7th Air Defense Artillery Regiment is an air defense artillery regiment of the United States Army, first constituted in the Regular Army as the 7th Regiment of Artillery on 8 March 1898. The 6th and 7th U.S. Artillery Regiments were constituted on 8 March 1898, three weeks after the explosion of USS Maine in Havana, Cuba on 15 February 1898, as the United States' declaration of war on Spain and commencement of the Spanish–American War seemed imminent.

== History ==
Constituted 8 March 1898 in the Regular Army as the 7th Regiment of Artillery. Organized 29 March 1898 at Fort Slocum, New York under the command of Colonel William Sinclair.

Order of battle information shows that batteries of the regiment deployed outside the U.S. in the Spanish–American War of 1898. However, no battle honors for this war are on the regiment's official lineage and honors certificate. Batteries C and M deployed to Puerto Rico.

The regiment was broken up on 13 February 1901 and its elements reorganized and redesignated as separate numbered companies and batteries of the Artillery Corps.

The regiment was reconstituted in the Regular Army as the 7th Coast Artillery on 27 February 1924 and organized on 1 July 1924 by redesignating the 72nd, 73rd, 74th, 75th, 76th, 78th, 79th, & 81st companies of the Coast Artillery Corps (CAC) at Ft. Hancock. Batteries A, B, D, and F carried the lineage and designations of the corresponding batteries in the old 7th Artillery. Initially, only the regimental headquarters and headquarters battery (HHB), HHBs for 1st, 2nd, and 3rd Battalions, and Batteries A, B, D, & E active, HHB 3rd Battalion and Battery E being the caretaking battery for the Harbor Defenses of the Delaware (HD Delaware) at Fort DuPont, Delaware. All other elements remained inactive.

1st Battalion inactivated 7 April 1930, 2nd Battalion inactivated 28 February 1930. HHB 3rd Battalion demobilized 1 September 1935 at Fort DuPont, personnel to Battery E.

Regiment reduced to caretaking detachments in 1930; Batteries B & D inactivated. Battery A inactivated 31 March 1930. Sole remaining active elements, the regimental HHB and Battery E, provided caretaking detachments for HD Sandy Hook and HD Delaware, respectively. A 34-man band was authorized 1 July 1937.

Batteries A & B reactivated at Fort Hancock, New Jersey 7 July 1939. Battery E inactivated 1 February 1940, personnel reassigned to the 21st Coast Artillery Regiment (Harbor Defense) (HD) and battery transferred to Fort Hancock, less personnel and equipment. Battery C activated at Fort Hancock 1 August 1940. HHB 1st and 2nd Battalions activated at Fort Hancock 11 January 1941. Batteries D, E, and F reactivated at Fort Hancock 13 January 1941.

On 23 September 1942 the 1st Battalion transferred, less personnel and equipment, to Fort Tilden, New York to join the 2nd Battalion there. Personnel of the 1st Battalion were reassigned to the 3rd Battalion, 245th Coast Artillery Regiment (HD), and vice versa. This placed the 7th Coast Artillery at Fort Tilden and the 245th Coast Artillery at Fort Hancock.

In May (or August) 1943, the 7th Coast Artillery (less Batteries D & G and an AA platoon at Fort Tilden, and Battery F detached to Fort Totten) returned to Fort Hancock until 23 February 1944. At that time most regimental assets were absorbed by HD New York and the HHB was reassigned to XXII Corps, further transferring to Army Ground Forces on 13 March 1944. HHB and 1st Battalion moved to Fort Leonard Wood, Missouri and 2nd Battalion to Camp Chaffee, Arkansas, where these units were inactivated on 7 and 13 April 1944.

Headquarters and Headquarters Battery (HHB), 7th Coast Artillery, reconstituted 28 June 1950 in the Regular Army; concurrently consolidated with HHB, 7th Antiaircraft Artillery Group (see Annex 1), and consolidated unit designated as HHB, 7th Antiaircraft Artillery Group. Activated 20 January 1952 at Fort Stewart, Georgia. Inactivated 15 January 1953 at Fort Stewart, Georgia. Activated 1 May 1954 in Korea. Inactivated 20 January 1955 in Korea. Activated l July 1955 in Greenland. Redesignated 20 March 1958 as HHB, 7th Artillery Group. Inactivated 20 December 1965 at Fort Totten, New York.

1st Battalion, 7th Coast Artillery, reconstituted 28 June 1950 in the Regular Army; concurrently consolidated with the 126th Antiaircraft Artillery Gun Battalion (see Annex 2) and consolidated unit redesignated as the 7th Antiaircraft Artillery Battalion. Redesignated 13 December 1951 as the 7th Antiaircraft Artillery Automatic Weapons Battalion. Activated 20 December 1951 at Camp Edwards, Massachusetts. Redesignated 30 June 1955 as the 7th Antiaircraft Artillery Battalion. Inactivated 1 September 1958 in Germany.

2nd Battalion, 7th Coast Artillery, reconstituted 28 June 1950 in the Regular Army; concurrently consolidated with the 26th Antiaircraft Artillery Automatic Weapons Battalion (active) (see Annex 3) and consolidated unit designated as the 26th Antiaircraft Artillery Automatic Weapons Battalion, an element of the 24th Infantry Division. Redesignated 1 January 1953 as the 26th Antiaircraft Artillery Battalion. Inactivated 15 October 1957 in Korea. Relieved 5 June 1958 from assignment to the 24th Infantry Division.

Headquarters and Headquarters Battery, 7th Artillery Group; 7th and 26th Antiaircraft Artillery Battalions; and 7th Field Artillery Battalion (organized in 1916) consolidated, reorganized, and redesignated 20 December 1965 as the 7th Artillery, a parent regiment under the Combat Arms Regimental System.

7th Artillery (less former 7th Field Artillery Battalion) reorganized and redesignated 1 September 1971 as the 7th Air Defense Artillery, a parent regiment under the Combat Arms Regimental System (former 7th Field Artillery Battalion concurrently reorganized and redesignated as the 7th Field Artillery – hereafter separate lineage). Withdrawn 16 December 1988 from the Combat Arms Regimental System and reorganized under the United States Army Regimental System with headquarters at Fort Bliss, Texas.

1st Battalion, 7th Air Defense Artillery was activated on 13 September 1972 at Fort Bliss, Texas and was inactivated there on 16 June 1987. The battalion was reactivated on 16 December 1988 in Germany.

On 21 December 1998, Headquarters United States Army Europe (USAREUR) announced plans to realign its air defense artillery units to comply with the Army's Patriot Standardization Plan. As a result of the plan, USAREUR realigned its 3 Patriot missile battalions with their 12 missile batteries, 2 maintenance companies and one maintenance team into 2 battalions with 5 batteries and one maintenance company each. The 1-7th Air Defense Artillery, with its Headquarters and Headquarters Battery and B and C Batteries subsequently moved from Rhine Ordnance Barracks, Kaiserslautern, Germany, to Fort Bliss, Texas. There it joined the 108th Air Defense Artillery Brigade.

A Battery, 1st Battalion, 7th ADA was assigned to the 5th Battalion, 7th ADA in Hanau, Germany and moved from the Rhine Ordnance Barracks near Kaiserslautern to Babenhausen, Germany. F Battery, 6th Battalion, 52nd ADA, located at Ansbach, was also assigned to the 5–7th ADA and moved to Babenhausen. These units were re-flagged as D Battery and E Battery, 5th Bn, 7th ADA. Now the battalion was stationed in Kaiserslautern, Germany, subordinate to the 10th Army Air & Missile Defense Command with five batteries and a maintenance company.

In June 2006, the Headquarters and Headquarters Battery, 108th Air Defense Artillery Brigade and 1-7th Air Defense Artillery moved to Fort Bragg, North Carolina.

On 1 October 2015, the 5th Battalion, 7th Air Defense Artillery officially completed a unit move from Rhine Ordnance Barracks to Baumholder, Germany. The move started in March 2015 and relocated all six units within the battalion to Smith Barracks in Baumholder.

=== Annex 1 (7th AAA Group) ===
Constituted 5 August 1942 in the Army of the United States as Headquarters and Headquarters Battery, 7th Antiaircraft Artillery Automatic Weapons Group (or 7th Coast Artillery Group (AA)). Activated 1 September 1942 at Camp Haan, California. Redesignated 26 May 1943 as Headquarters and Headquarters Battery, 7th Antiaircraft Artillery Group.

Departed the United States 21 October 1943, arrived in England 3 November 1943; landed in France 27 July 1944. Attached to 38th AAA Brigade and defended Nancy, France until 25 January 1945. Crossed into Luxembourg 19 March 1945 and entered Germany 29 March 1945. Located in Augsburg, Germany in August 1945.

Returned to New York port of embarkation 16 February 1946 and inactivated 17 February 1946 at Camp Kilmer, New Jersey.

=== Annex 2 (126th AAA Gun Battalion) ===
Constituted 25 February 1943 in the Army of the United States as the 126th Coast Artillery Battalion (AA-Gun). Activated 10 May 1943 at Camp Haan, California. Redesignated 28 June 1943 as the 126th Antiaircraft Artillery Gun Battalion.

Departed Boston Port of Embarkation 1 July 1944; arrived in England 8 July 1944. Moved to France and the European Theater of Operations 28 September 1944.

Returned to Hampton Roads port of embarkation 3 January 1946; inactivated same day at Camp Patrick Henry, Virginia.

=== Annex 3 (784th AAA Auto-Wpns Bn, 26th AAA-AW Bn) ===
Constituted 25 February 1943 in the Army of the United States as the 784th Coast Artillery Battalion (AA-Auto Wpns). Activated 10 April 1943 at Fort Bliss, Texas. Redesignated 30 April 1943 as the 784th Antiaircraft Artillery Automatic Weapons Battalion.

Departed Boston port of embarkation 7 April 1944; arrived in England 10 April 1944. Moved to France and the European Theater of Operations 14 July 1944. Located in Handorf, Germany in August 1945. Inactivated 31 December 1945 in Germany.

Redesignated 13 October 1948 as the 26th Antiaircraft Artillery Automatic Weapons Battalion and allotted to the Regular Army. Assigned 20 March 1949 to the 24th Infantry Division and activated in Japan.

== Current units ==
- 1st Battalion 7th Air Defense Artillery Regiment (1-7th ADAR)
- 5th Battalion 7th Air Defense Artillery Regiment (5-7th ADAR)

== Honors ==
=== Campaign participation credit ===
World War II: Normandy; Northern France; Rhineland; Ardennes-Alsace; Central Europe; England 1944

Korea: UN Defensive; UN Offensive; CCF Intervention; First UN Counteroffensive; CCF Spring Offensive; UN Summer-Fall Offensive; Second Korean Winter; and Korea, Summer 1953

Vietnam: Defense; Counteroffensive; Counteroffensive, Phase II; Counteroffensive, Phase III; Tet Counteroffensive; Counteroffensive, Phase IV; Counteroffensive, Phase V; Counteroffensive, Phase VI; Tet 69/Counteroffensive; Summer-Fall 1969; Winter-Spring 1970

=== Decorations ===
- Presidential Unit Citation (Army), streamer embroidered Defense of Korea (24th Infantry Division, 1950).
- Meritorious Unit Commendation, streamer embroidered VIETNAM 1966–1967 (1st Battalion, 7th Artillery, 1968).
- Meritorious Unit Commendation, streamer embroidered VIETNAM 1967–1968 (1st Battalion, 7th Artillery, 1969).

== Coat of arms ==
=== Blazon ===
- Shield

Gules, a pile voided Or crusilly fitchy of the like over all a Railway Gun in the act of firing Argent, flame Proper.

- Crest

On a wreath of the colors Or and Gules a panther passant guardant, incensed Or, flames Proper. Motto NULLIS PAVET OCCURSUM (He Fears No Encounter).

=== Symbolism ===
- Shield

The shield is scarlet for Artillery. The cross crosslets fitchy, from the arms of the Lords of Commercy, refer to the baptism of fire of a battery of the regiment at Royanmoix, near Commercy, World War I. The pile is from the coat of arms of the 53rd Artillery C.A.C., elements of which were later amalgamated into the 7th Coast Artillery. The railway gun commemorates the unique distinctive of Battery "E", 42nd Artillery C.A.C. (later Headquarters Battery, 7th Coast Artillery) of firing the first shot in World War I by a Coast Artillery organization.

- Crest

The panther is taken from the coat of arms of the Coast Defenses of Sandy Hook, where the regiment was organized on 1 July 1924.

=== Background ===
The coat of arms was originally approved for the 7th Coast Artillery Regiment on 28 July 1924. It was redesignated for the 7th Antiaircraft Artillery Automatic Weapons Battalion on 10 June 1952. The insignia was cancelled on 20 April 1960. It was restored and authorized effective 1 September 1971, for the 7th Air Defense Artillery Regiment.

== Distinctive unit insignia ==
- Description

A gold metal and enamel device 1 1/8 inches (2.9 cm) in height consisting of a panther in a walking position facing forward, with fire issuing horizontally from its mouth and ears, all gold; all within and surmounting a continuous red scroll inscribed "NULLIUS PAVET" above and "OCCURSUM" below in gold letters. The insignia is worn in pairs.

- Symbolism

The panther is taken from the coat of arms of the Coast Defenses of Sandy Hook, where the regiment was organized on 1 July 1924. The motto translates to "He Fears No Encounter".

- Background

The distinctive unit insignia was originally approved for the 7th Coast Artillery Regiment on 31 July 1924. It was redesignated for the 7th Antiaircraft Artillery Automatic Weapons Battalion on 10 June 1952. The insignia was cancelled on 20 April 1960. It was restored and authorized effective 1 September 1971, for the 7th Air Defense Artillery Regiment.

== See also ==
- 2nd Battalion 7th Air Defense Artillery Regiment (2-7th ADAR)
- 3rd Battalion 7th Air Defense Artillery Regiment (3-7th ADAR)
- 4th Battalion 7th Air Defense Artillery Regiment (4-7th ADAR)
- Field Artillery Branch (United States)
- Air Defense Artillery Branch (United States)
- U.S. Army Coast Artillery Corps
