= United States Army Air Defense Artillery School =

U.S. Army school for training in anti-aircraft warfare

- Active: 1942–present
- Country: United States
- Branch: United States Army
- Type: Air Defense Artillery
- Role: Training
- Size: Brigade
- Part of: Fires Center of Excellence
- Garrison/HQ: Fort Sill, Oklahoma
- Motto: "Always on Target"
- Website: https://sill-www.army.mil/30ada/

Commanders
- Current commander: COL John W. Brock II
- Command Sergeant Major: CSM Ronald A. Wasson

Insignia
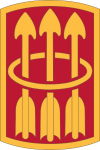
- 30th ADA Brigade SSI

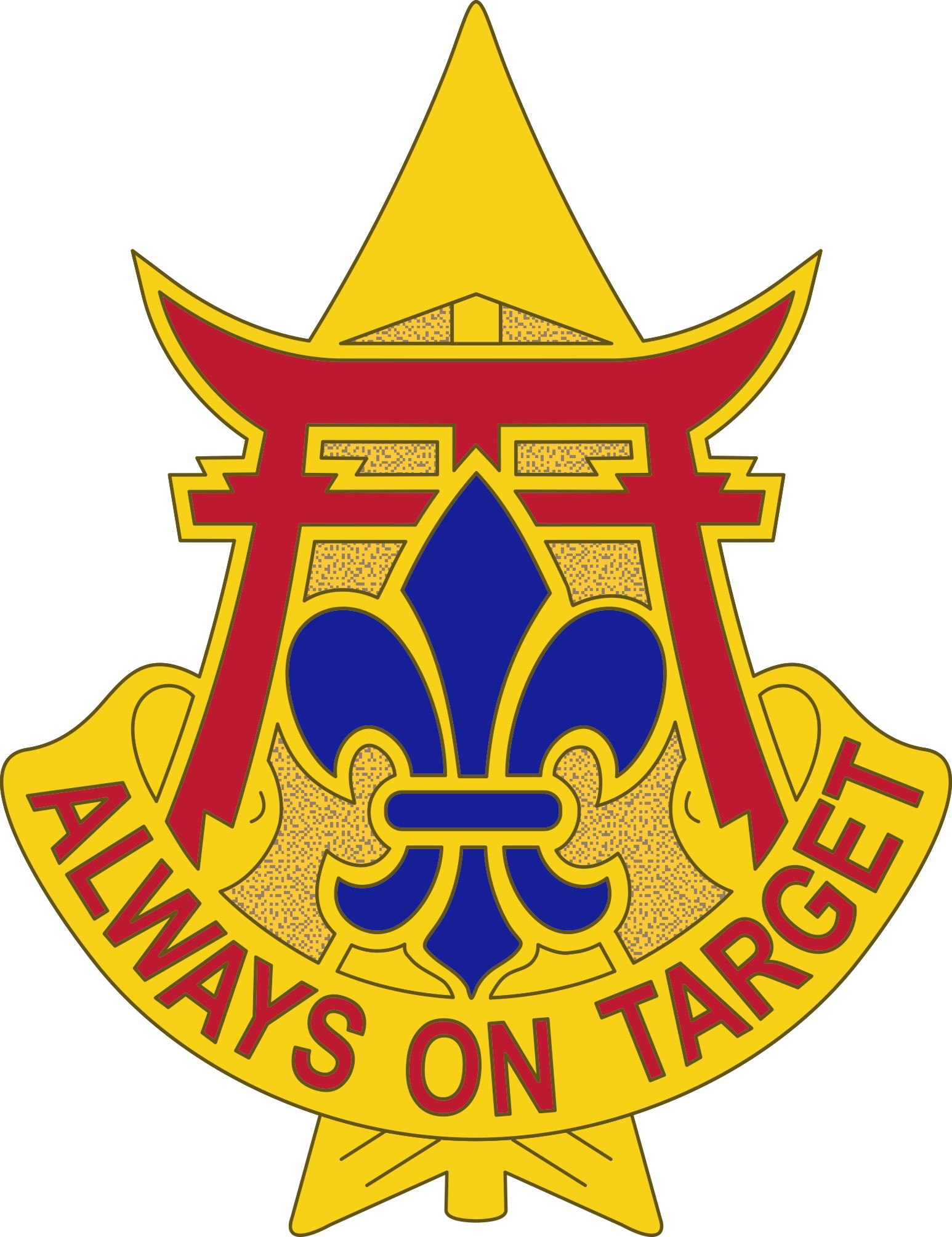
- 30th ADA Brigade DUI

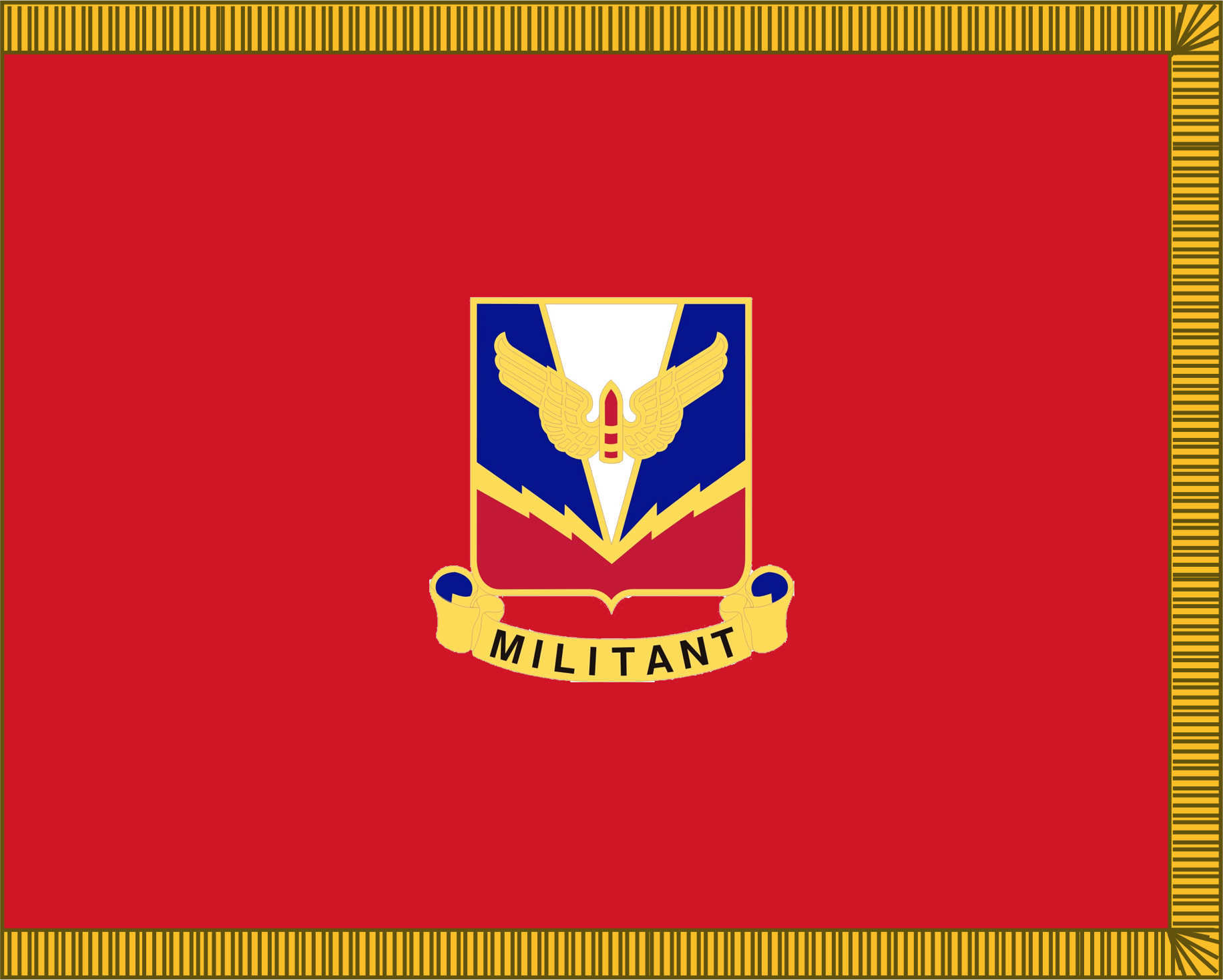
- Air Defense Artillery Center and School Flag

The Air Defense Artillery School is the professional school of the Air Defense Artillery Branch of the US Army. It is at Fort Sill, Oklahoma. The school was organized as the 6th ADA Brigade until 18 May 2012, when it was redesignated as the 30th Air Defense Artillery Brigade. The decision to redesignate the 6th ADA to 30th ADA was made after Col. Bill Stacey, the then-6th ADA commander, discovered that the 6th ADA had no official ADA colors.

== Current status ==
In June 2009, the Army Air Defense Artillery School and the 6th ADA Brigade relocated from Fort Bliss to Fort Sill. This move was a result of the 2005 BRAC moves. The motor transport operator (88M) course has moved to Fort Leonard Wood. There is a new Army policy replacing drill sergeants at AIT with regular noncommissioned officers from front line units. This is to free up drill sergeants for basic training. However, starting in 2018 Drill Sergeants made a comeback, somewhat due to 'disciplinary' issues amongst trainees.

The Brigade has two battalions in its current configuration.

- 2nd Battalion, 6th ADA Regiment, with C-RAM, Sentinel, Stinger/Avenger
- 3rd Battalion, 6th ADA Regiment, with MIM-104 Patriot, THAAD

== Former Brigade Commanders ==
- COL Donald G. Fryc
- COL William M. Stacey
- COL James P. Payne
- COL David R. Baxter
- COL Maurice O. Barnett
- COL William M. Parker
- COL Tony L Dedmond Jr.

== Former Command Sergeants Major ==
- CSM Bryan A. Pinkney
- CSM David C. Cowan
- CSM Timothy D. Hockenberry
- CSM Thomas L. Egan
- CSM John L. Young
- CSM Randy B. Gray
- CSM Melissa A. Calvo

== See also ==
- Camp Davis
