= 30th Air Defense Artillery Brigade =

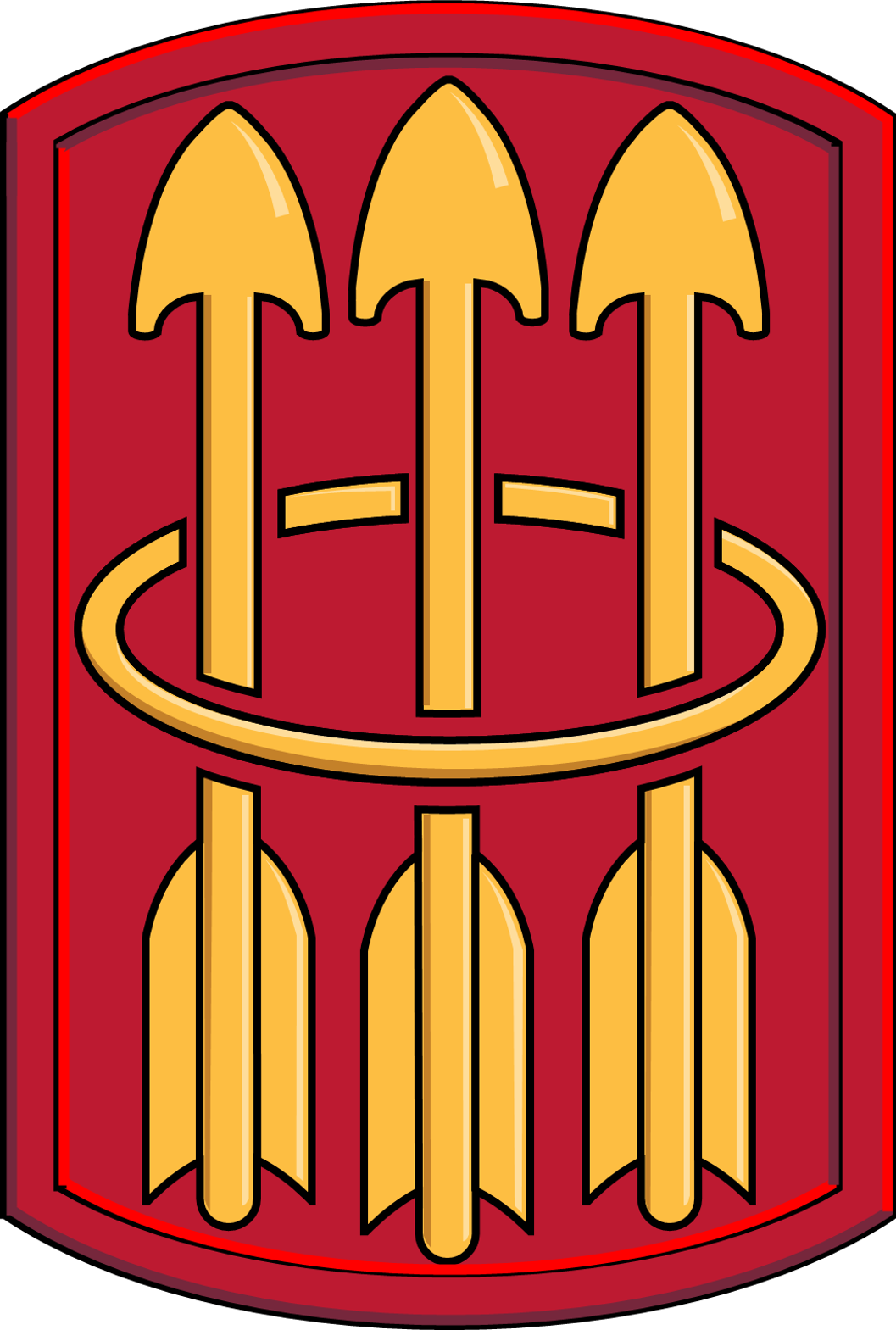
- Active: 1917 - 1921; 1949 - 1973; 2012 - present
- Country: United States
- Branch: United States Army
- Role: Air Defense ArtilleryTraining
- Size: Brigade
- Part of: United States Army Air Defense Artillery School
- Garrison/HQ: Fort Sill, Oklahoma
- Motto: Always On Target
- Website: https://www.army.mil/fcoe#org-air-defense-artillery

Commanders
- Current commander: Col. Robert Ferryman
- Command Sergeant Major: CSM Chris L. Cooper

Insignia
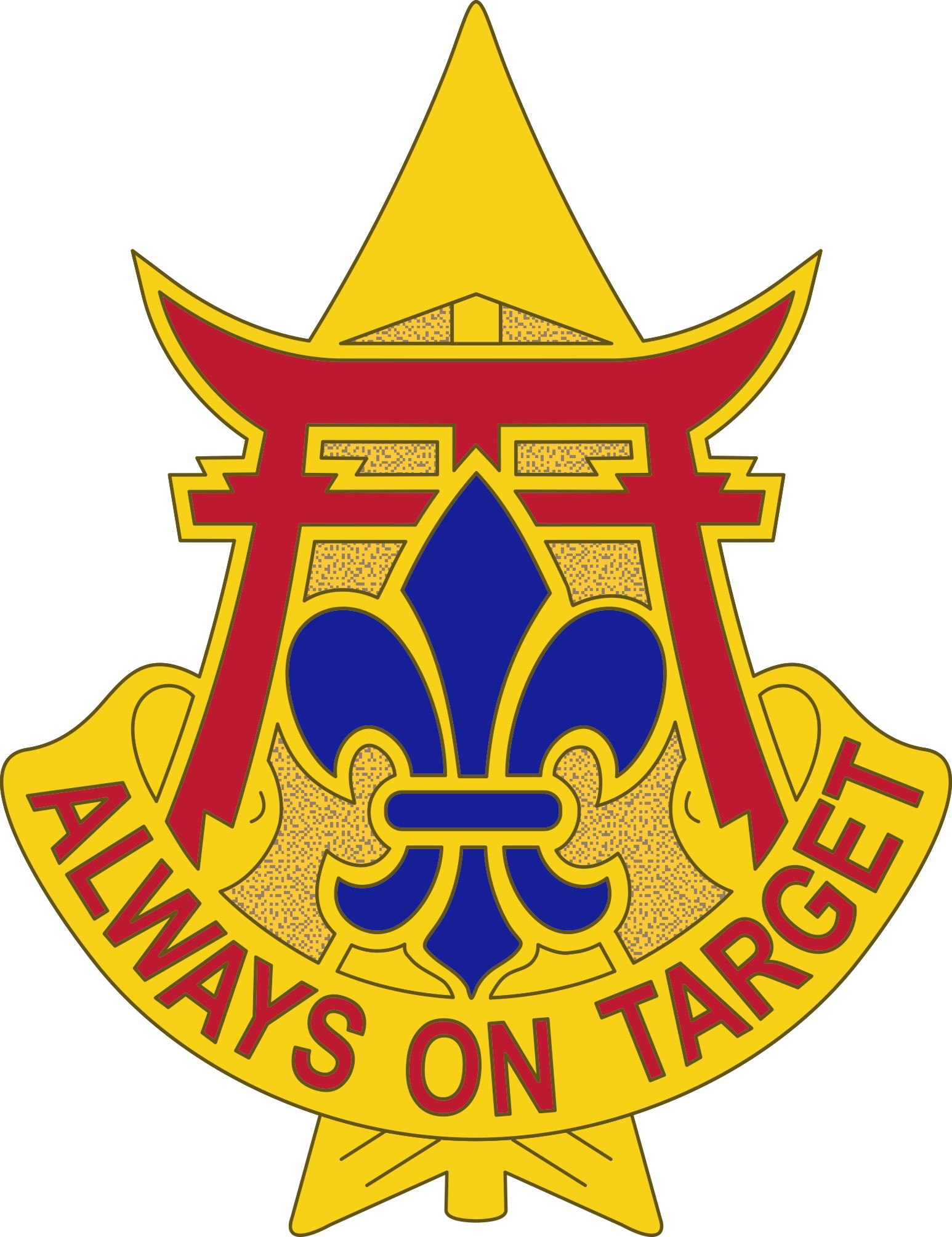
- 30TH AIR DEFENSE ARTILLERY BRIGADE DUI

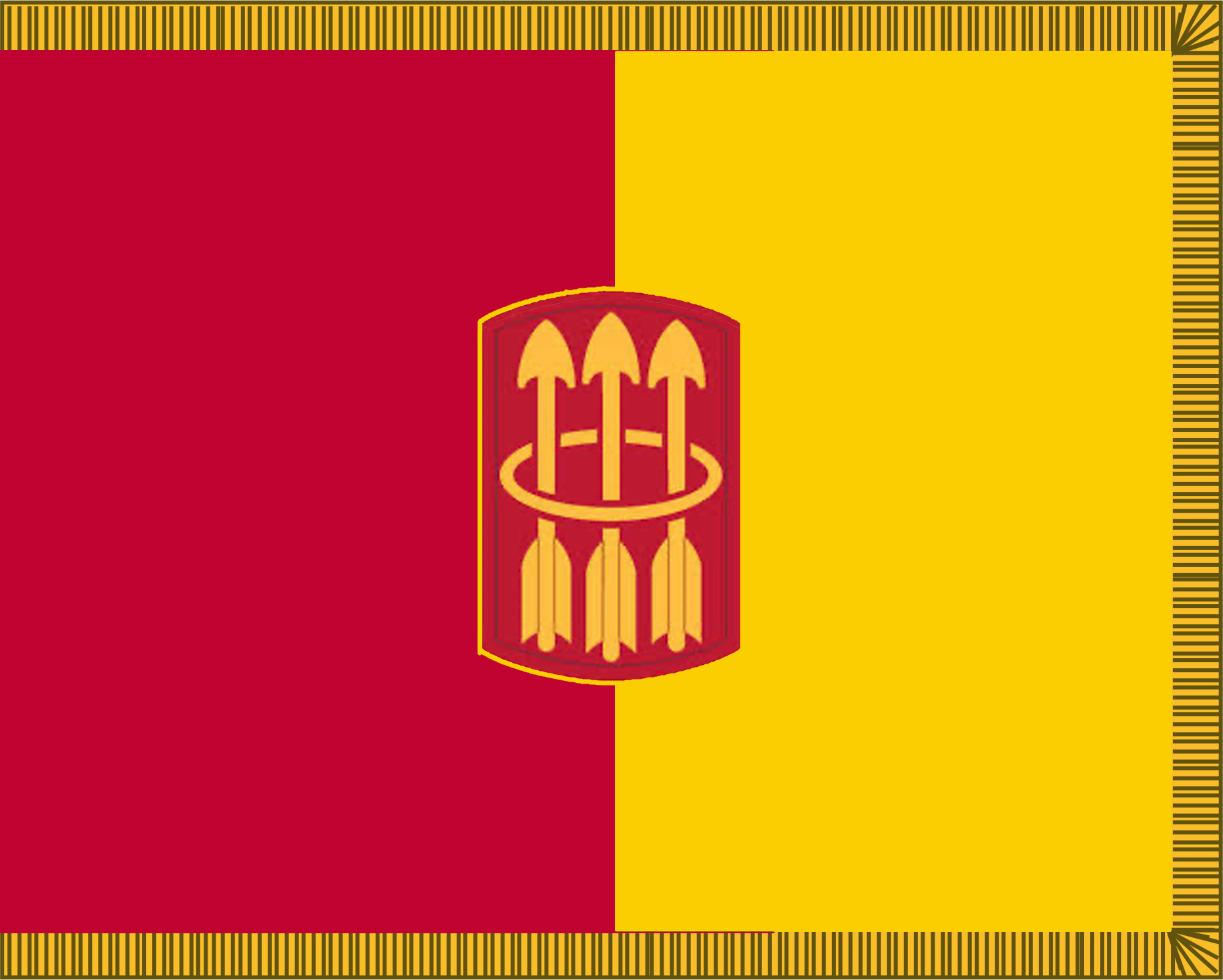
- 30th Air Defense Artillery Brigade Flag

The 30th Air Defense Artillery Brigade is a training brigade under the U.S. Fires Center of Excellence at Fort Sill, Oklahoma responsible for ADA Advanced Individual Training (AIT), Officer Education and Warrant Officer Education.

== History ==
The brigade began in the regular army as the First Expeditionary Brigade of the Coast Artillery Corps at Fort Adams on July 24, 1917. In 1918 it was redesignated as the 30th Artillery Brigade. The brigade was sent to France as a heavy railway gun unit where they earned campaign streamers for the Saint-Mihiel and Meuse-Argonne offensives. The brigade was deactivated at Camp Eustis in 1921.

The brigade was reactivated in 1949 as an anti-aircraft artillery unit in Okinawa, Japan. In 1959, they transitioned from traditional AA guns to Nike-Hercules air defense missiles and were redesignated in 1960 as an Air Defense Artillery Brigade. Elements of the brigade were sent to Vietnam between 1967 and 1972. The brigade was deactivated in 1973.

In May 2012 the brigade was again activated, this time as an ADA training brigade under TRADOC at Fort Sill.

== Heraldry ==
The unit patch (SSI) is a red shield with three upward pointing gold arrows in a circle. The arrows represent the Ryukyu Islands which were once the home of the brigade.

The DUI is a blue fleur-de-lis in front of a red Torii gate which represent the units WWI and post-WWII service. Behind the gate is a gold arrow facing up. And at the bottom of the pin is a gold scroll with the motto "Always On Target" in red.
