= 5th Battalion, 7th Air Defense Artillery Regiment =

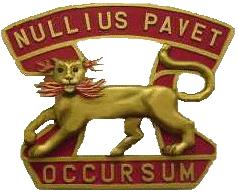
- 5–7 ADA distinctive unit insignia
- Active: 1898–1940, 1941–44, 1949–57, 1958–68, 1988 – present
- Country: United States
- Branch: United States Army
- Type: Air defense
- Role: Surface-to-air missile
- Size: Battalion
- Part of: 10th Army Air & Missile Defense Command
- Garrison/HQ: USAG Rheinland-Pfalz
- Nickname(s): "No Fear" Battalion
- Motto(s): Nullius Pavet Occursum, "He Fears No Encounter"
- Engagements: World War II; Korean War

The 5th Battalion, 7th Air Defense Artillery Regiment (5-7 ADA) is a Patriot air defense battalion of the United States Army. It is currently a subordinate unit of the 10th Army Air & Missile Defense Command (AAMDC) and comprises six subordinate units: a headquarters and headquarters battery, four Patriot fire batteries, and a maintenance company. 5-7 ADA is headquartered at Smith Barracks in Baumholder, Germany.

== History ==
The 5th Battalion, 7th Air Defense Artillery was originally constituted on 8 March 1898 in the Regular Army as Battery E, 7th Regiment of Artillery. It organized on 31 March 1898 at Fort Slocum, NY. It was reorganized and redesignated on 13 February 1901 as the 75th Company, Coast Artillery, Artillery Corps.

The unit was later re-designated on 2 February 1907 as the 75th Company, Coast Artillery Corps; on 18 July 1916 as the 2nd Company, Fort Kamehameha Hawaii; on 31 August 1917 as the 2nd Company, Coast Defenses of Oahu; in February 1921 as the 2nd Company, Coast Defenses of Pearl Harbor; and on 30 June 1922 as the 75th Company, Coast Artillery Corps.

It was reorganized and re-designated on 1 July 1924 as Battery E, 7th Coast Artillery. It inactivated on 1 February 1940 at Fort Dupont, DE. It reactivated on 13 February 1941 at Fort Hancock, New Jersey, and inactivated on 13 April 1944 at Camp Chaffee, AR. It was disbanded on 14 June 1944. The unit was reconstituted on 28 June 1950 in the Regular Army; and concurrently consolidated with Battery A, 26th Antiaircraft Artillery Automatic Weapons Battalion (active) which itself was originally constituted on 25 February 1943 in the Army of the United States as Battery A, 784th Coast Artillery Battalion, and activated on 10 April 1943 at Fort Bliss, Texas. That unit was later re-designated on 30 April 1943 as Battery A, 784th Antiaircraft Artillery Automatic Weapons Battalion and inactivated on 31 December 1945 in Germany.

It was re-designated on 13 October 1948 as Battery A, 26th Anti-aircraft Artillery Automatic Weapons Battalion, and allotted to the Regular Army, and activated on 20 March 1949 in Japan as an element of the 24th Infantry Division. The consolidated unit was designated as Battery A, 26th Anti-aircraft Artillery Automatic Weapons Battalion, an element of the 24th Infantry Division. It was re-designated on 1 January 1953 as Battery A, 26th Anti-aircraft Artillery Battalion and inactivated on 15 October 1957 in Korea. The 26th Antiaircraft Artillery Battalion meanwhile was relieved on 5 June 1958 from assignment to the 24th Infantry Division.

The unit was consolidated on 12 August 1958 with Battery E, 7th Field Artillery (organized in 1916), and the consolidated unit was re-designated as Headquarters and Headquarters Battery, 5th Missile Battalion, 7th Artillery (its organic elements were concurrently constituted). The battalion was activated on 1 September 1958 at Tappan, NY. It was re-designated on 20 December 1965 as the 5th Battalion, 7th Artillery. It inactivated on 30 November 1968 at Tappan, NY.

It was re-designated (less former Battery E, 7th Field Artillery) on 1 September 1971 as the 5th Battalion, 7th Air Defense Artillery (former Battery E, 7th Field Artillery, concurrently re-designated as the 5th Battalion, 7th Field Artillery – hereafter separate lineage). It reactivated on 17 December 1988 at Fort Bliss, TX.

On 21 December 1998 Headquarters U.S. Army Europe announced plans to realign its air defense artillery units to comply with the Army's Patriot Standardization Plan. As a result of the plan, USAREUR realigned its three Patriot missile battalions with their twelve missile batteries, two maintenance companies and one maintenance team into two battalions with five batteries and one maintenance company each. A Battery, 1st Battalion, 7th ADA was assigned to the 5th Battalion, 7th ADA in Hanau and moved from Rhine Ordnance Barracks to Babenhausen, Germany. F Battery, 6th Battalion, 52nd ADA, located at Ansbach, was also assigned to the 5–7th ADA after reflagging to D Battery, and moved to back to Rhine Ordnance Barracks in Kaiserslautern in January 2008 as the receiving Battery for the rest of the Battalion from Hanau and Babenhausen, under the 357th Air and Missile Defense Detachment, (AMD-D). Now the battalion is stationed in Kaiserslautern, Germany subordinate to the 10th Army Air & Missile Defense Command with five batteries and a maintenance company.

On 1 October 2015, the 5th Battalion, 7th Air Defense Artillery officially completed a unit move from Rhine Ordnance Barracks to Baumholder, Germany. The move started in March 2015 and relocated all 6 units within the battalion to Smith Barracks.

== See also ==
- Air Defense Artillery Branch (United States)
- U.S. Army Coast Artillery Corps
