= 52nd Air Defense Artillery Brigade =

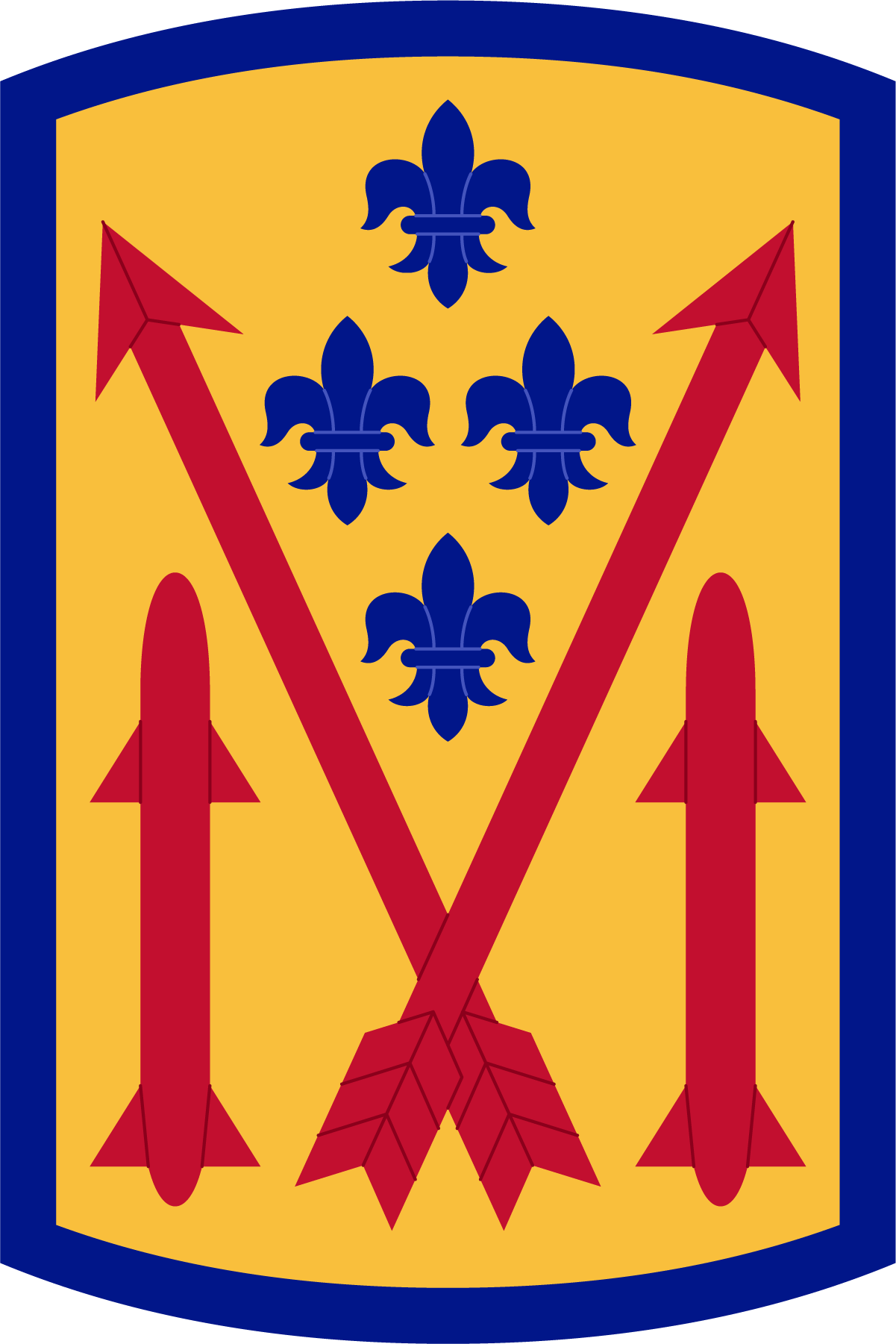
- Active: 2022-present
- Country: United States
- Branch: United States Army
- Type: Air Defense Artillery
- Size: Brigade
- Part of: 10th Army Air and Missile Defense Command
- Garrison/HQ: Sembach, Germany
- Mottos: Vigilant and Ready
- Engagements: World War II -Normandy -Northern France -Rhineland -Ardennes-Alsace; 2026 Iran war -2026 Iranian strikes on Jordan
- Decorations: Belgian Fourrage (1940)
- Website: https://www.10thaamdc.army.mil/Units-of-10th-AAMDC/52nd-Air-Defense-Artillery-Brigade/

Commanders
- Current commander: Col. Steven Rachamim
- Command Sergeant Major: CSM Kenneth Paul
- First Commander: Col. Bruce Bredlow

Insignia
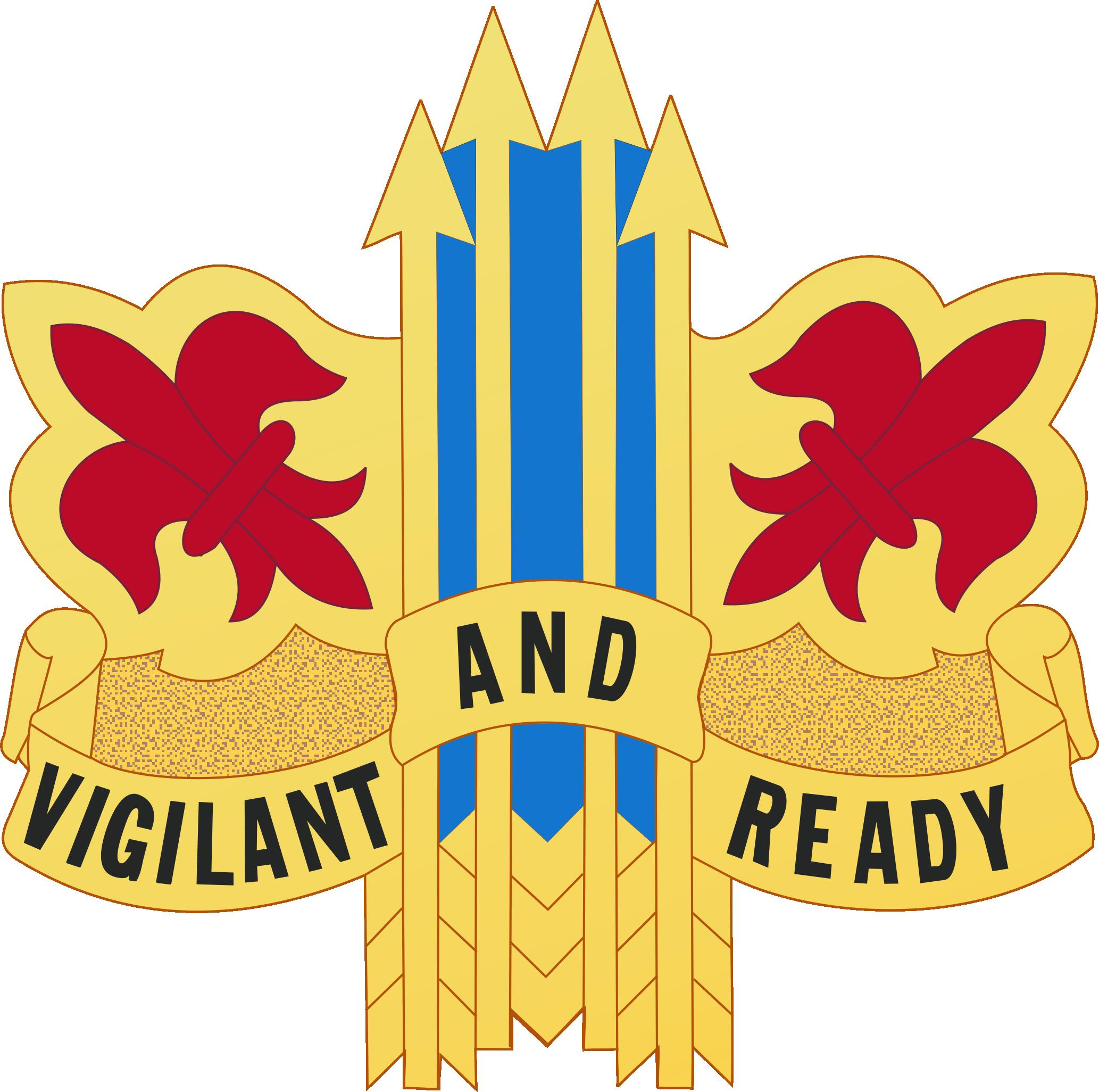
- 52nd Air Defense Artillery Brigade DUI

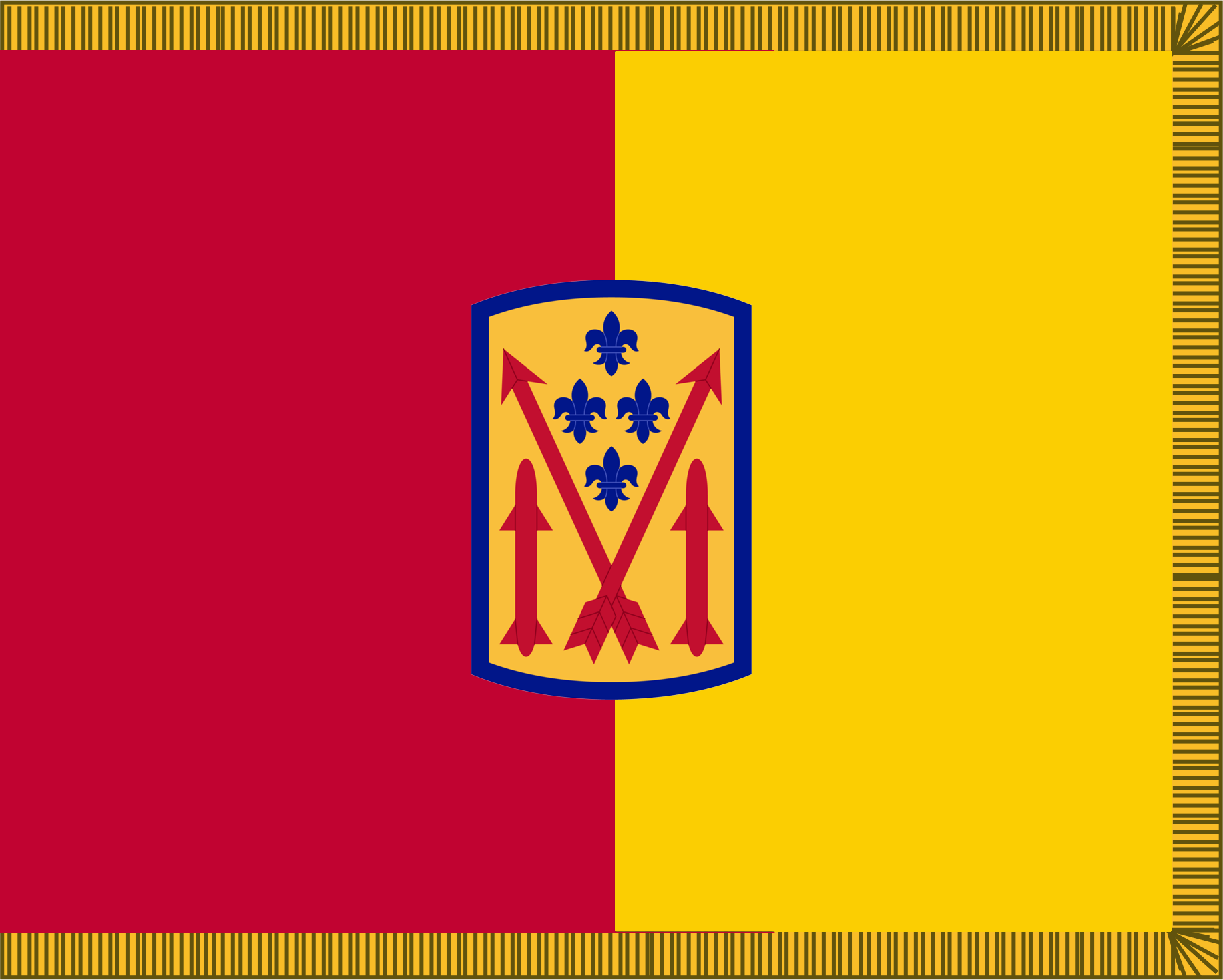
- 52nd Air Defense Artillery Brigade Flag

The 52nd Air Defense Artillery Brigade (52D ADA BDE) is a unit of the US Army in Sembach, Germany that was reactivated in October 2022. The Brigade's mission is to support the European Command with short and long range air defense systems.

== History ==
The 52D ADA BDE was originally organized as HHB, 52nd Coast Artillery Brigade in September 1942 and activated at Camp Edwards, Massachusetts. It was redesignated in May as the HHB, 52nd Antiaircraft Artillery Brigade and inactivated in November 1945. It was reorganized as the 52nd Artillery Brigade (Air Defense) in March 1958 and redesignated as HHB, 52nd Air Defense Artillery Brigade in March 1972. It was inactivated June 1973.

== Subordinate Units ==
- 5th Battalion, 4th Air Defense Artillery Regiment at Shipton Kaserne, Ansbach, Germany
- 1st Battalion, 57th Air Defense Artillery Regiment at Ansbach, Germany
- 5th Battalion, 7th Air Defense Artillery Regiment at Baumholder, Germany
- 11th Missile Defense Battery Site K Joint NATO Base at Turkey
