= Fort Duvall =

Former United States Military Fort in Hull, Massachusetts

- Part of Harbor Defenses of Boston
- Spinnaker Island (formerly Hog Island), Hull, Massachusetts
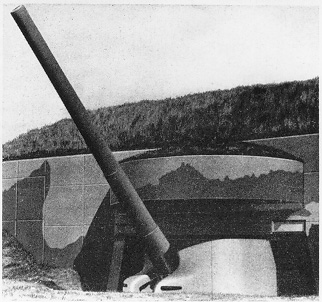
- A 16-inch casemated gun, similar to those at Fort Duvall

Site information
- Type: Coastal Defense
- Owner: Spinnaker Island and Yacht Club
- Controlled by: private/Town of Hull
- Open to the public: no

Location
- Location in Massachusetts
- Coordinates: 42°18′0.36″N 70°53′45.17″W

Site history
- Built: 1920-1927
- Built by: United States Army
- In use: 1927-1948
- Battles/wars: World War II

Fort Duvall was a Coast Artillery fort, part of the Harbor Defenses of Boston, in Massachusetts. What was then called Hog Island in Hull, Massachusetts was acquired by the U.S. government in 1917, and the fort was constructed in the early 1920s. It had only one gun battery, Battery Long, but it mounted the largest caliber weapons in the entire harbor defense system: a pair of 16-inch guns. These were the 16-inch gun M1919, of which only seven were deployed; 16-inch weapons deployed later were supplied by the Navy.

Circa 1920 the Brewster Islands Military Reservation and the Calf Island Military Reservation were considered for a 16-inch battery; at that time a twin naval-type turret was envisioned. However, Fort Duvall was built instead.

In 1922 the fort was named for Major General William Penn Duvall (1847-1920). A graduate of West Point, Duvall was born in Maryland, was a principal assistant to the Army Chief of Artillery, and served two tours of duty in the Philippines (the second as commander of all Army troops there), where he distinguished himself by his even-handed administration of the islands.

The long-range guns of Fort Duvall could cover an arc running roughly from Gloucester in the north down to Plymouth in the south, and extending well out to sea. Hidden behind the bluff at Point Allerton, the fort could not be observed from the sea. Fire for the guns was directed and observed from the tall fire control tower at Point Allerton, which survives to the present (2016) under private ownership.

Fort Duvall's guns were initially in open mounts, but were casemated in 1942 to protect against air attack. At the time of Battery Long's construction, the next largest guns were the barbette-mounted 12-inch guns of Battery Gardner at Fort Ruckman in Nahant, MA. Later, two more 16-inch guns were added in Nahant at Battery Murphy. A third pair of 16-inch guns was planned for Fort Dawes on Deer Island, but after the emplacements were constructed at the outset of WW2, the tubes for this battery were never delivered. Due to the emplacement of 16-inch guns, in the early 1940s many of the longer-range 10-inch and 12-inch batteries of the harbor defenses (including the batteries at Fort Revere in Hull, just north across the water from Fort Duvall), plus all of their 12-inch coast defense mortars, were decommissioned and scrapped.

In 1948 Fort Duvall's guns were scrapped and the island was retained by the Army. From 1952 to 1955 a battery of four 90 mm antiaircraft guns was on the island. From 1956 to 1974 the fort was used as a Nike missile control center (B-36 C), with the launch site (B-36 L) at Webb Memorial State Park in Weymouth. In 1974 the island was turned over to the Commonwealth of Massachusetts, and was used to store school textbooks until sold to private interests for development as a gated community.

== Gallery ==
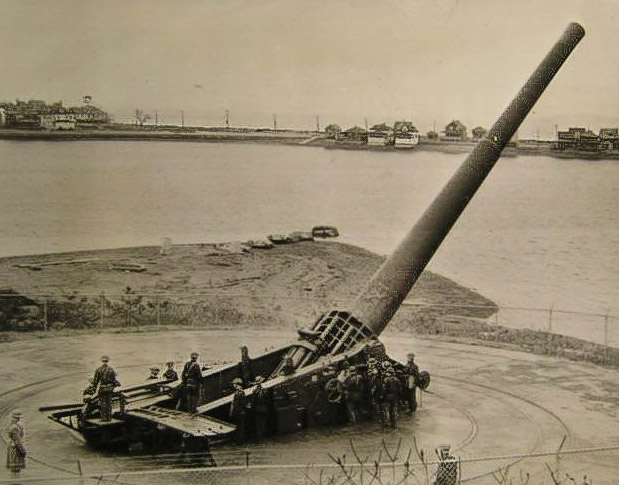
16-inch gun M1919 at Fort Duvall.

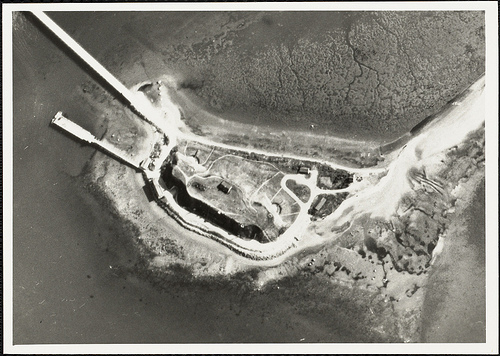
Fort Duvall after casemating in World War II.

A 2010 view, looking westward at Hog Island, the site of Fort Duvall. Later the site was purchased, covered with condominiums, and renamed it Spinnaker Island. The arrow points to the casemate of Gun 2 of Battery Long, which is now a parking garage.

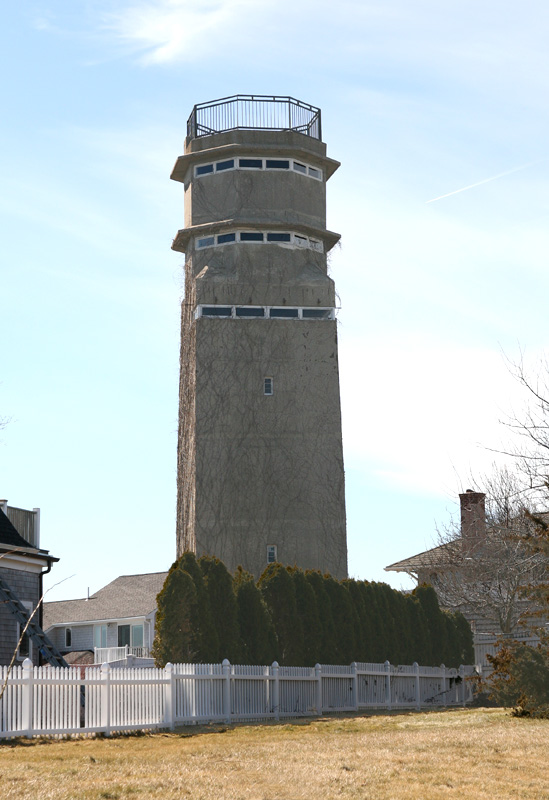
A 2010 photo of the fire control tower in Hull built for Fort Duvall.

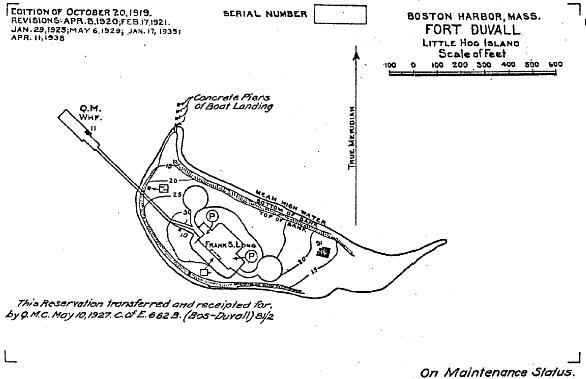
A 1938 map of Fort Duvall, with Battery Long, indicated. Gun 2 is on the left. At that time, Hog Island was not connected to Hull.

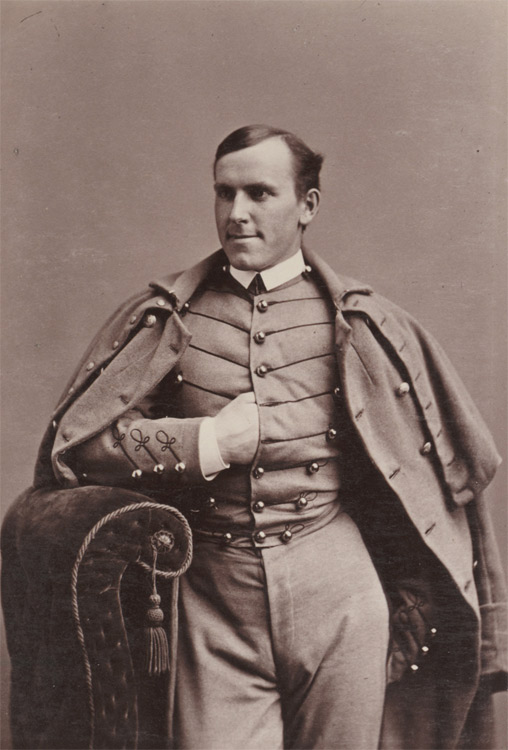
William Penn Duvall, as a West Point cadet, Class of 1869

== See also ==
- 9th Coast Artillery (United States)
- 241st Coast Artillery (United States)
- Seacoast defense in the United States
- United States Army Coast Artillery Corps
- List of military installations in Massachusetts
