= Harbor Defenses of Boston =

Coordinates: 42°23′03″N 70°58′49″W

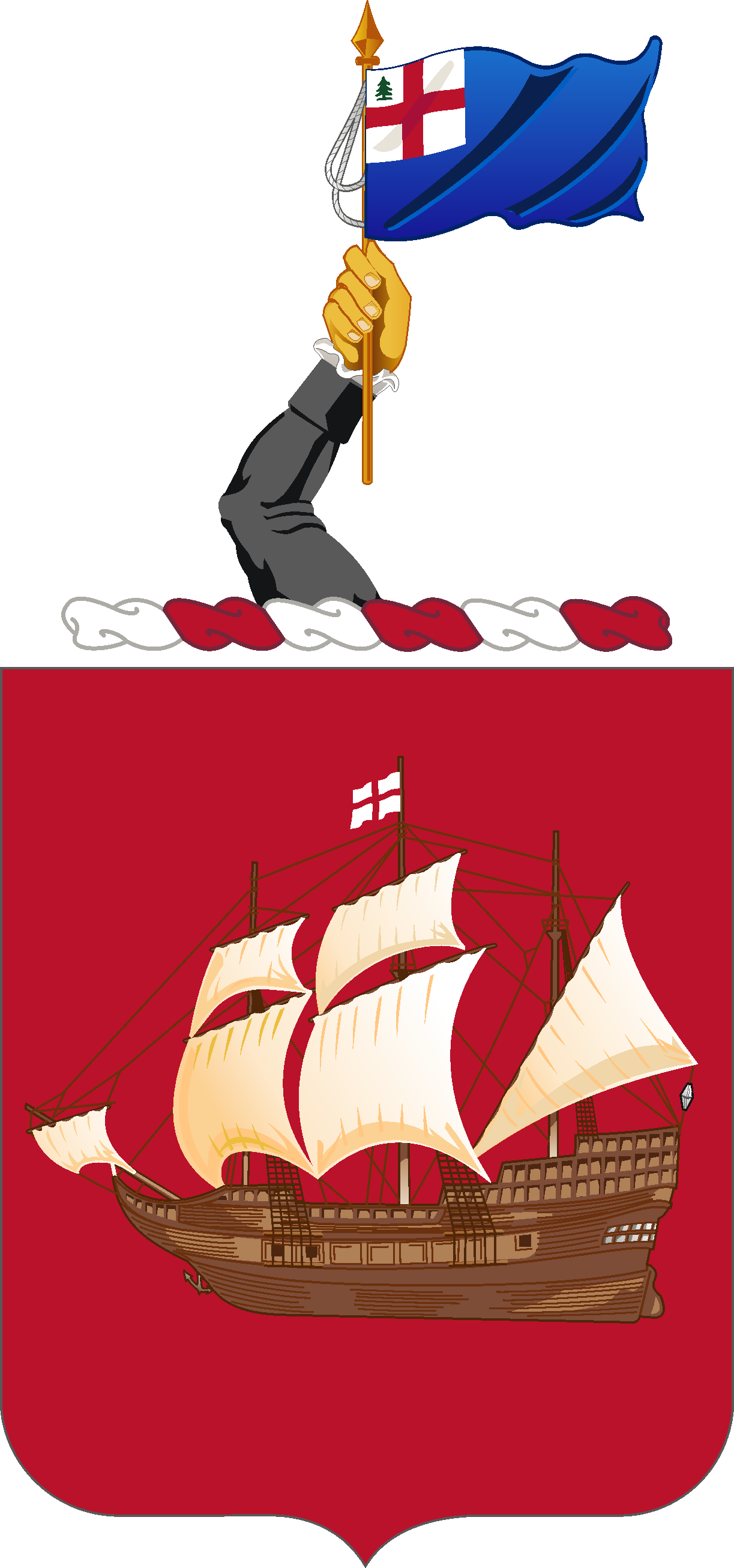
- Coat of arms
- Active: 1895-1950
- Country: United States
- Branch: United States Army Coast Artillery Corps
- Type: Coast artillery
- Role: Harbor Defense Command
- Part of: First Army 1933–1941; Eastern Defense Command 1941–1945
- Garrison/HQ: Fort Banks, Winthrop, MA
- Motto: "Prima Libertatis Acie" (In the First Line of Battle for Liberty)
- Mascot: Oozlefinch

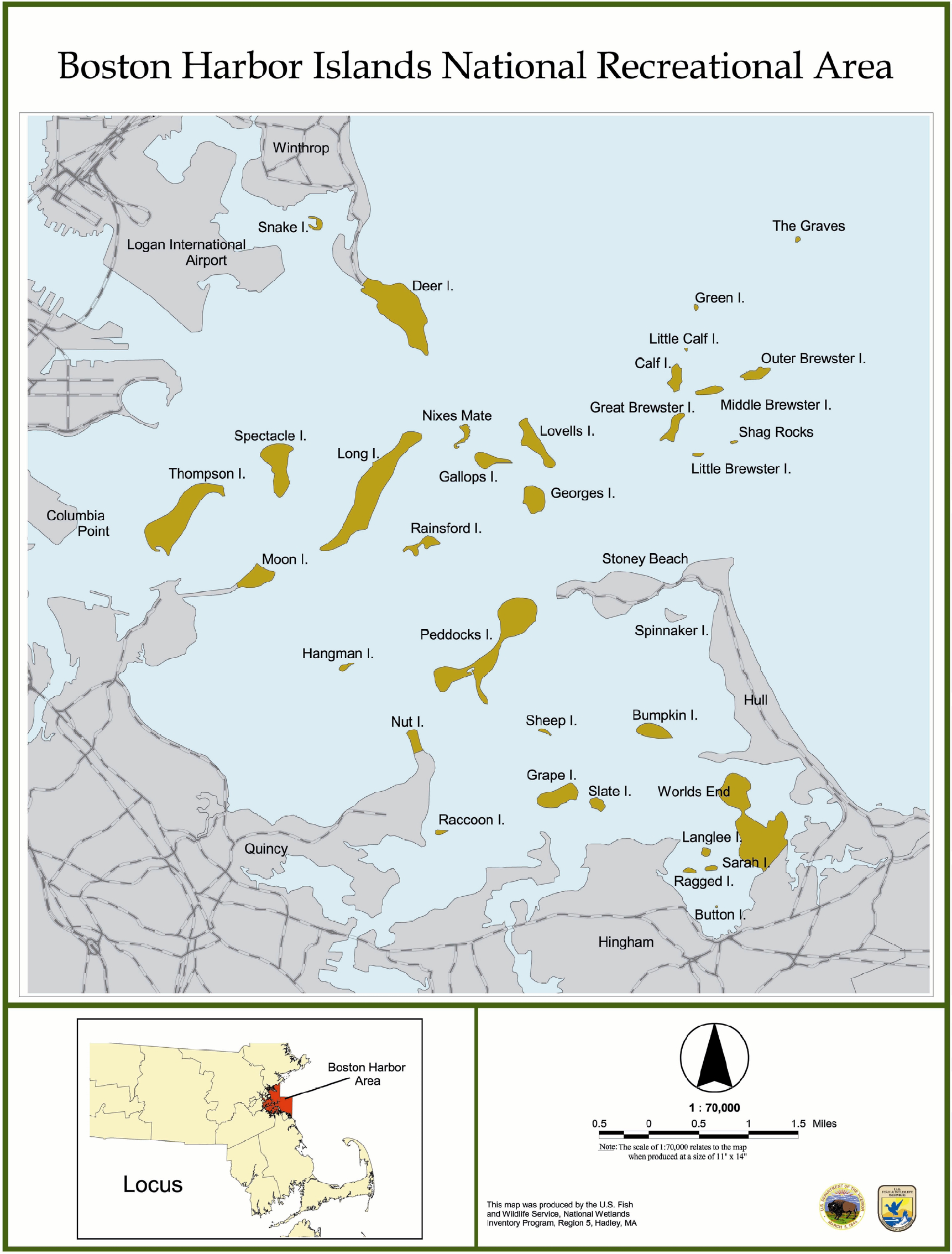
Map of the Boston Harbor islands. Not shown to the north is the Nahant peninsula, site of Fort Ruckman and the East Point Military Reservation.

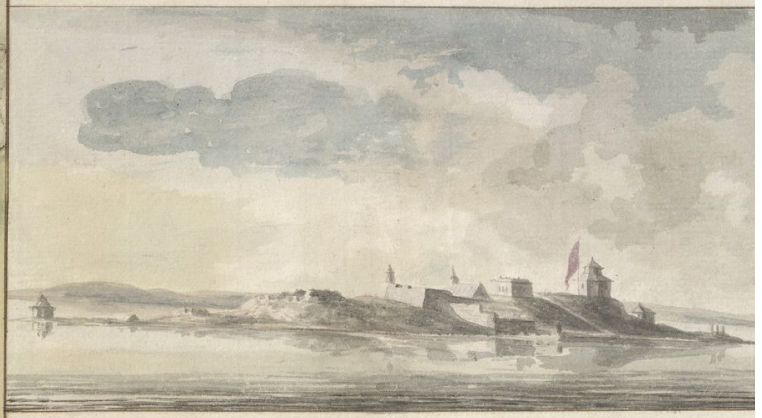
Castle William in 1773, by William Pierie.

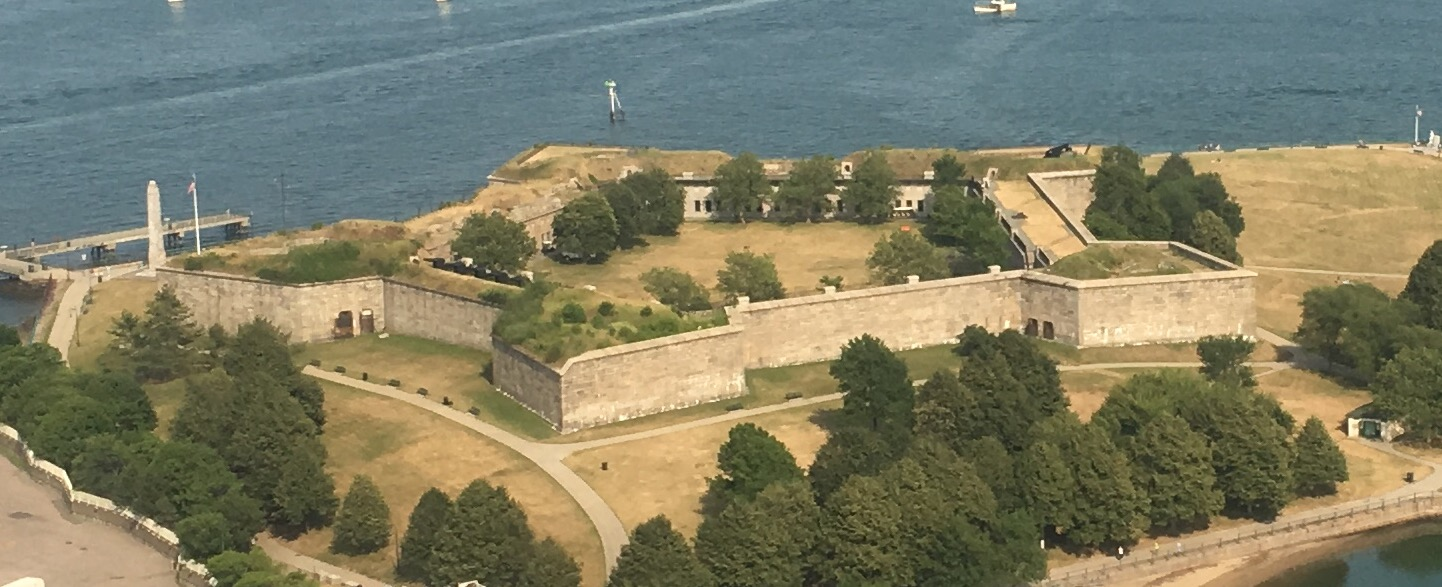
Fort Independence as rebuilt in the mid-19th century.

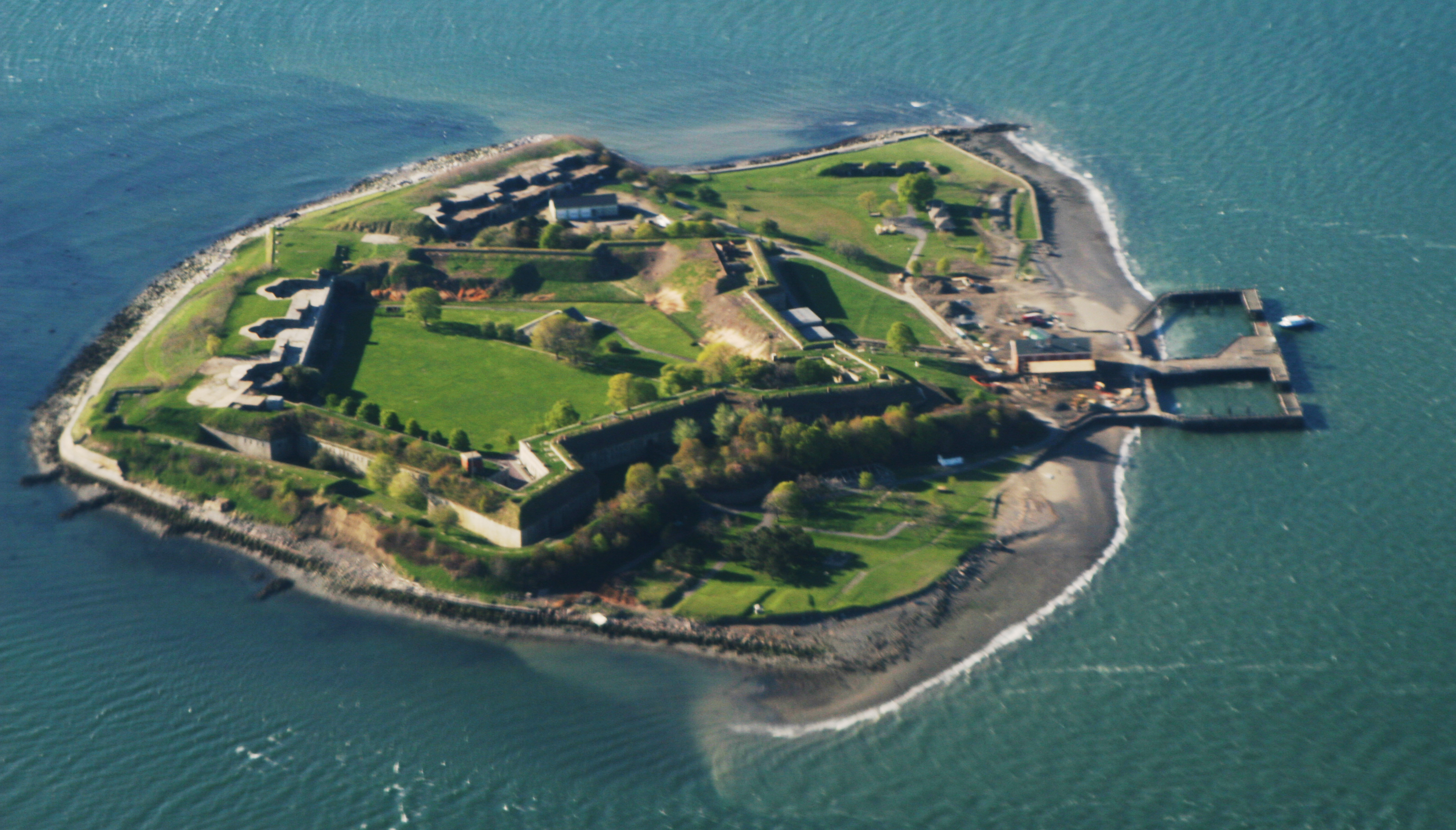
Aerial view of Fort Warren.

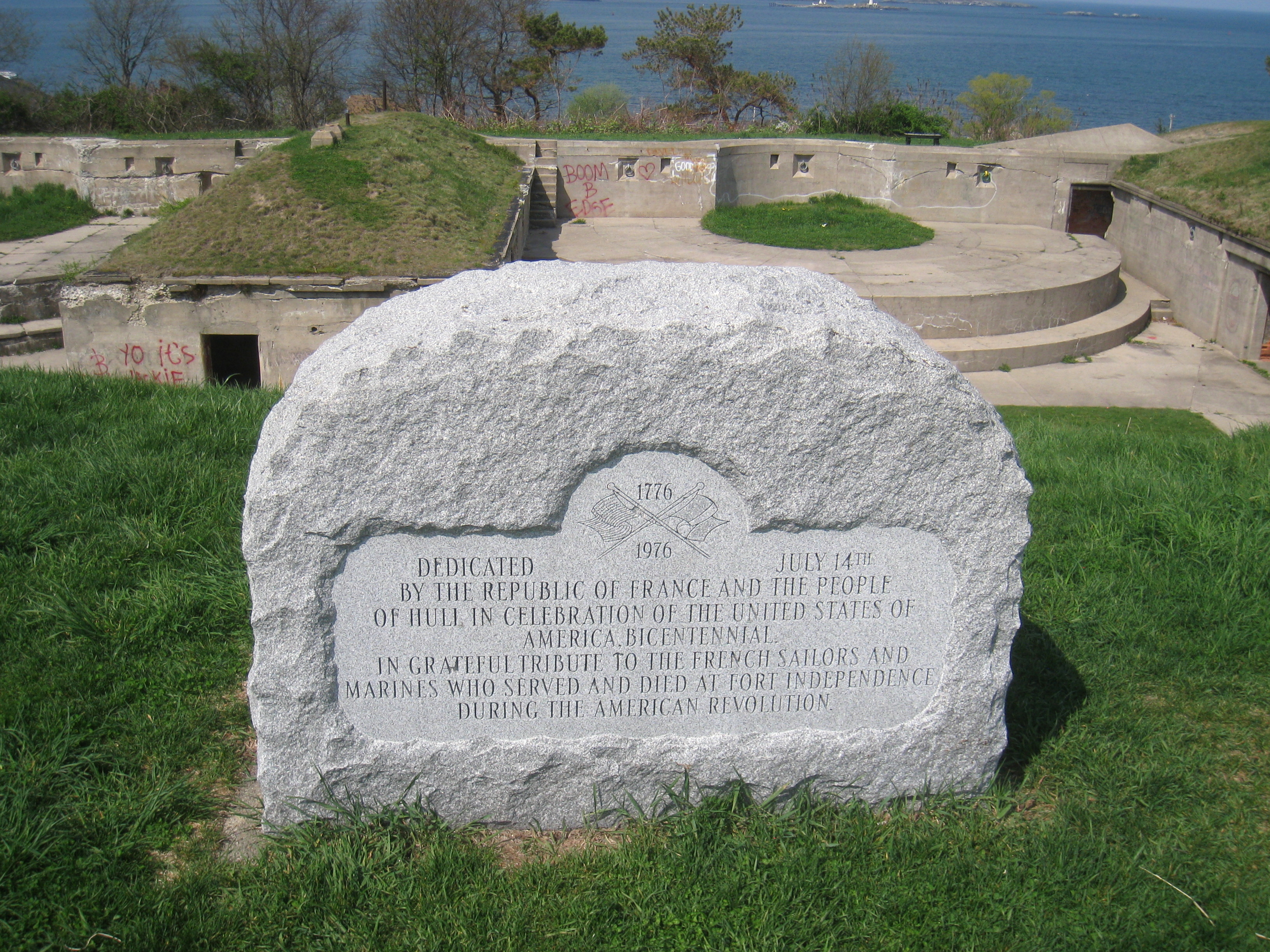
Bicentennial memorial to the first Fort Independence, 6-inch disappearing emplacements at Fort Revere in background.

The Harbor Defenses of Boston was a United States Army Coast Artillery Corps harbor defense command. It coordinated the coast defenses of Boston, Massachusetts from 1895 to 1950, beginning with the Endicott program. These included both coast artillery forts and underwater minefields. The command originated circa 1895 as the Boston Artillery District, was renamed Coast Defenses of Boston in 1913, and again renamed Harbor Defenses of Boston in 1925.

== History ==
=== Early Boston forts ===
==== Colonial period ====
Boston Harbor's principal coastal fort of the colonial era was Castle William, whose site was first fortified in 1634 and called "the Castle" until 1692, when it was renamed for William III, the King of England at the time. It is one of the oldest continuously fortified sites in the northeastern United States; however, the site of Fort William and Mary near Portsmouth, New Hampshire was fortified at least two years previously. The fort was rebuilt and expanded many times (six times prior to the American Revolution, once during it, and twice afterward), and in 1797 was named Fort Independence. The fort is on Castle Island, which was connected to the mainland by a causeway in 1928.

==== Revolutionary War ====
The major event in the Boston area in the first year of the American Revolution was the Siege of Boston from 19 April 1775 to 17 March 1776. The Continental Army under George Washington besieged British forces in the city. The British built several forts as a result, notably on Governor's Island and Noddle's Island. In January 1776 artillery captured at Fort Ticonderoga in upstate New York was brought to the Boston area under Henry Knox, providing the Patriot forces with more and larger cannon than they previously had. In the first week of March these weapons were used to engage the enemy. The turning point was the capture and fortification of Dorchester Heights on 5 March, allowing the Continental Army to bombard the British fleet in the harbor. The British evacuated Boston on 17 March under a truce, taking the ships carrying their army to Halifax, Nova Scotia. However, they damaged and destroyed Castle William and its ordnance as best they could, to deny its use to the Patriots.

Patriot forces occupied and rebuilt the British forts in the area to the best of their abilities, including Castle William (also called Fort Adams) and the forts on Governor's and Noddle's Islands. A new fort was built in 1776 on Telegraph Hill in Hull and named Fort Independence. In 1778-1780 a force of French Marines from D'Estaing's fleet greatly expanded the fort (probably assisted by Patriot forces), supervised by Chief Engineer du Portail, a French military engineer officer assisting the Continental Army at General Washington's direction.

==== 1783-War of 1812 ====
In 1794 Castle William/Fort Adams was repaired to some extent. In 1797 or 1799 (references vary) President John Adams visited the fort. At that time it was renamed Fort Independence and a complete rebuilding was projected. The fort in Hull lost the name and was called either the Allerton Battery or "the French fort" afterwards. The name "Fort Adams" went to a fort in Newport, Rhode Island completed in 1799. The newly christened Fort Independence was rebuilt 1801-1803 under the first system of US fortifications and was designed by French-born engineer officer Jean Foncin. It had 42 guns in the fort, with two outer batteries for six guns each, and could house two companies of about 100 men each, with an external wooden barracks for six additional companies. In 1808-1812 Fort Warren (renamed Fort Winthrop in 1834) was built on Governor's Island under the second system of US fortifications, with 12 guns in the fort and 20 guns in two water batteries. After the outbreak of the War of 1812 the fort on Noddle's Island was rebuilt with state resources as Fort Strong, named for Governor Caleb Strong.

==== 1816-1890 ====
Major new defenses for Boston were built under the third system of US fortifications. In 1833 work was to begin on a rebuilding and expansion of Fort Independence as a granite fort, but commencement was delayed until 1836 due to funding problems cause by an inflation spike. The rebuilt fort was substantially complete by 1848, although repairs and other work continued until 1861. Another large granite fort was begun in 1833 on George's Island and named Fort Warren; the previous fort of that name on Governor's Island was renamed Fort Winthrop. The new Fort Warren, designed for 300 guns, was completed in 1861. A large central citadel with 16 guns was added to Fort Winthrop and its water batteries were rebuilt for seven guns each. The supervising builder of Forts Independence, Warren, and Winthrop was Sylvanus Thayer, best known as Superintendent of West Point although he spent most of his career building the Boston forts.

Boston Harbor was not attacked in the Civil War; however, the forts served as mobilization centers and Fort Warren was a POW camp. Rearmament of the forts with the new Rodman guns, primarily 15-inch and 10-inch caliber, began during the war, most likely along with some 100-, 200-, and 300-pounder Parrott rifles.

The Civil War showed that masonry forts were vulnerable to rifled cannon; the classic example was the siege of Fort Pulaski near Savannah, Georgia in 1862. Also, Parrott rifles had shown an alarming tendency to burst when fired. In the 1870s a major rebuilding of coast defenses was projected. These were centered on earth-protected batteries of Rodman guns along with some Parrott rifles. However, all funding for new fortifications was cut off in 1879 before much had been accomplished in the Boston area. The existing forts were at least partially rearmed with Rodman guns. The external batteries of Fort Winthrop were rebuilt for Rodman guns, and the southeast bastion of Fort Warren was roofed over with massive brick arches. A plaque at the fort states that it was a prototype casemated battery for 15-inch Rodmans, certainly rare in the US and possibly unique. In 1879 Fort Independence was placed in caretaker status and was not further used as a fort, although it was re-occupied as a torpedo and mine depot in the Spanish–American War. Fort Winthrop also went into caretaker status about the same time, also with some re-use in that war.

=== Endicott period ===
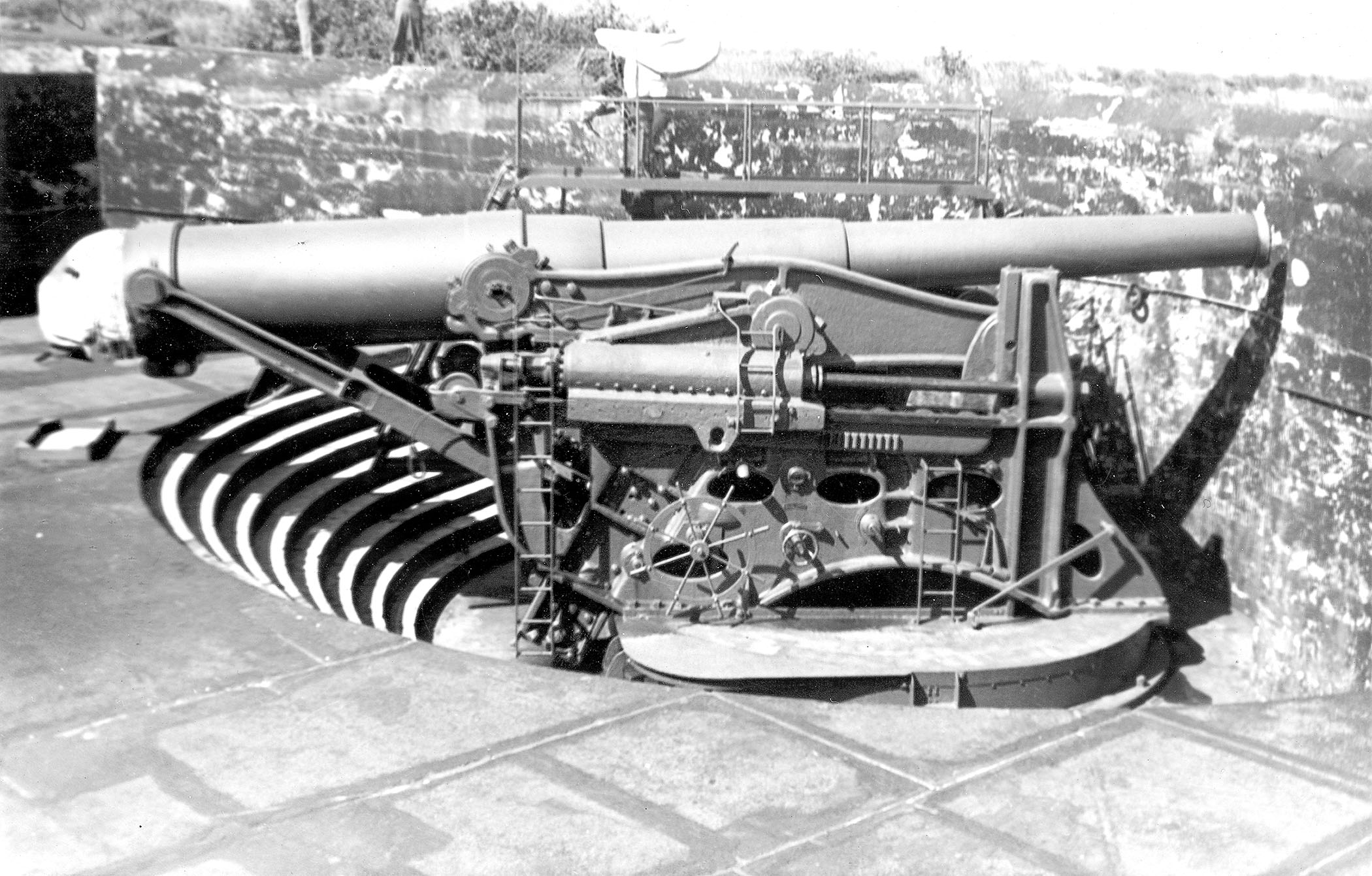
12-inch gun M1895 on disappearing carriage M1896, similar to installations at Fort Warren and Fort Heath.

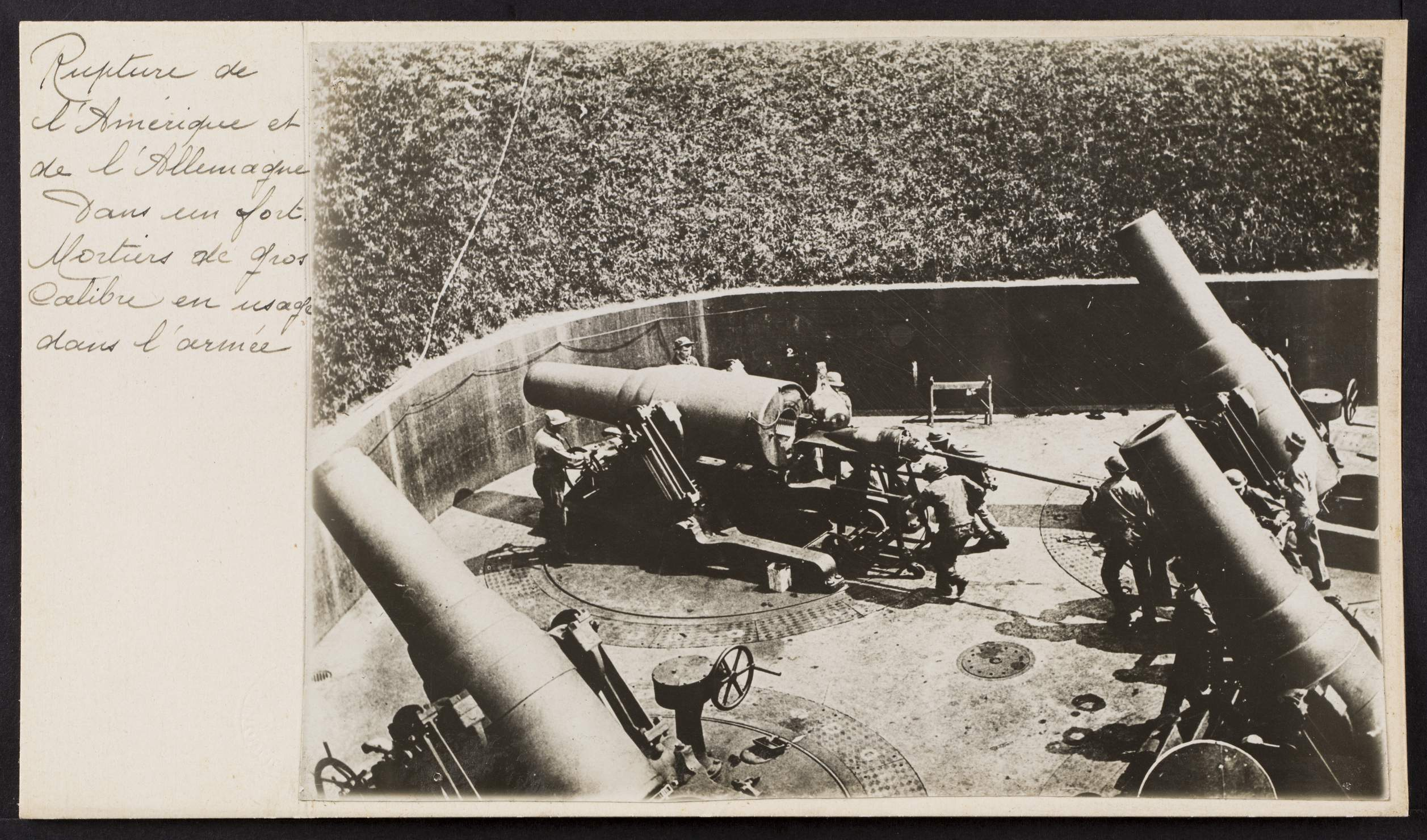
12-inch mortar pit, similar to installations at Fort Banks and Fort Andrews.

The Board of Fortifications was convened in 1885 under Secretary of War William Crowninshield Endicott to develop recommendations for a full replacement of existing coast defenses. Most of its recommendations were adopted, and construction began in 1892 on new forts to defend the Boston area. Two underwater minefields also guarded the harbor. Construction continued during the command of John L. Tiernon; most of the forts were completed by the end of 1904, and the last was completed in 1907. The complex geography of the harbor area required seven forts to defend it, including the rebuilding of parts of Fort Warren on George's Island. The six new forts were Fort Banks and Fort Heath in Winthrop, Fort Strong on Long Island, Fort Andrews on Peddocks Island, Fort Revere on Point Allerton in Hull (on the site of the Revolutionary War's Fort Independence), and Fort Standish on Lovells Island. The heavy weapons were as follows: Fort Banks had sixteen 12-inch (305 mm) mortars in the "Abbot Quad" configuration (four pits in a square with four mortars per pit) to concentrate their fire; it was the first mortar battery of the Endicott program completed. Nearby Fort Heath had three 12-inch guns on disappearing carriages. Fort Strong had five 10-inch (254 mm) disappearing guns while Fort Andrews had sixteen 12-inch mortars with the pits in an open-back line to improve reloading. Fort Warren was rebuilt with two 12-inch and five 10-inch disappearing guns, Fort Revere had two 12-inch guns on barbette carriages, and Fort Standish had four 10-inch guns. Medium-caliber weapons included two 4.72-inch (120 mm) Armstrong guns at Fort Strong, two 6-inch (152 mm) guns and two 5-inch (127 mm) guns at Fort Andrews, six 6-inch guns and two 5-inch guns at Fort Revere, and five 6-inch guns at Fort Standish. Smaller weapons were also provided to defend the minefields against minesweepers; these were primarily several models of 3-inch (76 mm) guns with an odd pair of 4-inch (102 mm) guns at Fort Warren.

As the new forts entered service, by 1908 Forts Independence and Winthrop (which had a magazine explosion in 1902) were removed from use.

The battery of two 4.72-inch (120 mm) Armstrong guns at Fort Strong was among many hastily added following the outbreak of the Spanish–American War in 1898. Most of the Endicott batteries were years from completion, and it was feared the Spanish fleet would bombard the US east coast. In 1917, during World War I, these guns were transferred to Sachuest Point in Middletown, Rhode Island and removed from service in 1919, shortly after the war ended. One is preserved as a memorial in Ansonia, Connecticut.

In 1909 a vast landward defense system was proposed for the Boston area, 70 miles long with its ends at Lynn and Hingham, but none of it was built.

In 1910 four M1890 12-inch (305 mm) mortars were removed from Fort Andrews and sent to the Philippines; two of these survive at Battery Geary, Fort Mills, Corregidor. These weapons saw action in the Japanese invasion in 1941-42. At Fort Andrews they were replaced by M1908 mortars in 1913.

In 1911-12 eight of Fort Banks' sixteen M1886 12-inch (305 mm) mortars were replaced with M1890 mortars; the remainder were replaced in 1915. Also, in 1912-13 the fort's structure was largely replaced due to inferior concrete, and the magazines were expanded.

In 1914 a one-gun 10-inch (254 mm) battery at Fort Warren was disarmed and abandoned due to inferior concrete; this was Battery Jack Adams inside the stone fort.

=== World War I ===
The American entry into World War I brought many changes to the Coast Artillery and the Coast Defenses of Boston (CD Boston). Numerous temporary buildings were constructed at the forts to accommodate the wartime mobilization. As the only component of the Army with heavy artillery experience and significant manpower, the Coast Artillery was chosen to operate almost all US-manned heavy and railway artillery in that war. Stateside garrisons were drawn down to provide experienced gun crews on the Western Front. Some weapons were removed from forts with the intent of getting US-made artillery into the fight. 8-inch, 10-inch, and 12-inch guns and 12-inch mortars were converted to railway artillery, while 5-inch and 6-inch guns became field guns on wheeled carriages. 12-inch mortars were also removed to improve reload times by reducing the number of mortars in a pit from four to two. Few railway artillery pieces were mounted and few or none saw action before the Armistice. The remounted 5-inch and 6-inch guns were sent to France, but their units did not complete training in time to see action. The 5-inch guns were removed from service in 1920, but the 6-inch guns were stored and many returned to service in World War II.

It appears that four mortars from Fort Banks and six from Fort Andrews were removed for potential service as railway artillery and not returned to the forts. All four of Fort Warren's 10-inch guns were removed for the same reason; these were replaced with different 10-inch guns in 1919. One of Fort Strong's 10-inch guns was removed and not replaced. Three of Fort Revere's 6-inch guns and all four of Fort Revere's and Fort Andrews' 5-inch guns were removed and not replaced (Fort Andrews' 5-inch guns went to Fort Story, Virginia). Two of Fort Standish's 6-inch guns were removed, but were remounted in 1919. Other weapons were earmarked for transfer, and some of these were dismounted, but were remounted after the war.

During and after World War I two- and three-gun antiaircraft batteries armed with M1917 3-inch (76 mm) guns on fixed mounts were built at some forts. Some of these weapons remained in service through early World War II, others were replaced by towed 3-inch guns in the 1930s.

References indicate the authorized strength of CD Boston in World War I was 32 companies, including 12 from the Massachusetts National Guard and five from the Rhode Island National Guard. Eight of these companies (four Massachusetts National Guard, one Rhode Island National Guard, and the rest regular army) were transferred to the 55th Artillery (Coast Artillery Corps), which served in France in World War I.

=== Interwar ===
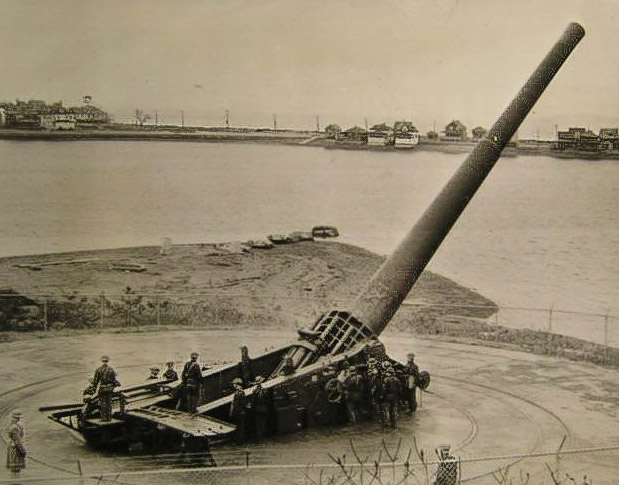
One of Fort Duvall's 16-inch M1919 guns.

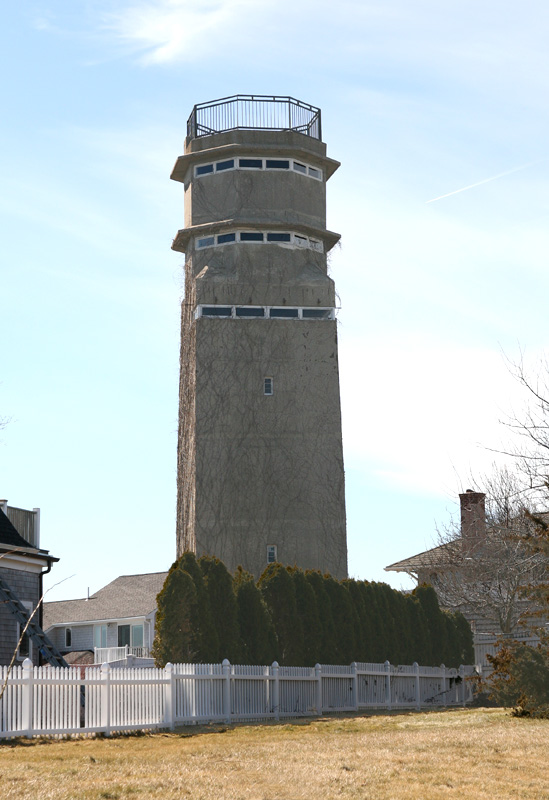
Fire control tower near Fort Duvall.

In 1920 a number of weapons deployed in limited quantities, plus the 3-inch gun M1898, were declared obsolete and removed from the forts. These included all Army 5-inch guns, the 4.72-inch Armstrong guns, the pair of 4-inch guns at Fort Warren, and many of the 3-inch guns throughout CD Boston, leading to some redeployments of 3-inch weapons.

On 1 July 1924 the harbor defense garrisons completed the transition from a company-based organization to a regimental one, and on 9 June 1925 the commands were renamed from "Coast Defenses..." to "Harbor Defenses...". The 9th Coast Artillery was the Regular Army component of HD Boston from 1 July 1924 through 23 February 1944, when it was disbanded. The 241st Coast Artillery was the Massachusetts National Guard component of HD Boston from 30 April 1924 through inactivation on 7 October 1944.

A major change in Boston Harbor between the wars required a new fort: the opening of a new ship channel in the northern part of the harbor. To cover this approach Fort Ruckman was built in Nahant from 1918 to 1924, with two 12-inch (305 mm) guns on M1917 long-range barbette carriages that increased the guns' range from 18,400 yards (16,800 m) to 29,300 yards (26,800 m). This type of weapon was developed in response to the progressive improvement of dreadnought battleships with better guns and armor. Although the end of World War I meant a general drawdown in US coast defenses, the Boston area was also chosen for one of the first 16-inch (406 mm) gun batteries built by the United States. This was Fort Duvall on Hog Island (now Spinnaker Island), south of the Hull peninsula and thus not visible from the ship channel, built 1919-1927. The fort had two M1919 16-inch (406 mm) guns on a new high-angle barbette carriage that allowed an elevation of 65 degrees and a range of 49,100 yards (44,900 m). This increased the opportunity for plunging fire against the decks of enemy warships as they approached. An alternate proposal in 1920 was to build a naval-type turret with two 16-inch guns on Great Brewster Island, but this was not implemented. Calf Island Military Reservation was also considered, but the battery was finally built (without a turret) as Fort Duvall.

=== World War II ===
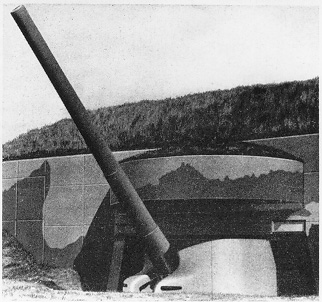
A casemated 16-inch gun.

Early in World War II numerous temporary buildings were again constructed to accommodate the rapid mobilization of men and equipment. The 241st Coast Artillery was activated on 16 September 1940, while three battalions of the 9th Coast Artillery were activated in February and June 1941. The long-abandoned Fort Winthrop was demolished in mid-1941 due to an expansion of Logan Airport. After the Fall of France in 1940 the Army decided to replace all existing heavy coast defense guns with 16-inch guns, but retained long-range 12-inch batteries including Fort Ruckman. Fort Ruckman and Fort Duvall were casemated during World War II for protection against air attack, as were the new 16-inch batteries. In 1942 construction began on the East Point Military Reservation in Nahant, including Battery Murphy (also called Battery 104) with two 16-inch (406 mm) guns; this battery entered service in June 1944, extending Fort Ruckman's coverage of the northern approaches to the harbor. Another 16-inch battery, Battery 105 at Fort Dawes on Deer Island in the middle of the harbor, was also built but not armed. An additional 16-inch battery, Battery 106, was proposed for the Fourth Cliff Military Reservation in Scituate but was not built.

The 16-inch batteries were supplemented by new 6-inch (152 mm) batteries. These included heavy earth-covered concrete bunkers for ammunition and fire control, with the guns protected by open-back shields. The guns for these batteries were mostly the 6-inch guns removed in World War I for field service and stored since that war; a new 6-inch gun M1 of similar characteristics was developed when this supply of guns began to run out. Four of these batteries were built in the Boston area, of which three were armed. These were Battery 206 at the East Point Military Reservation, Battery 207 at Fort Dawes (not armed), Battery Jewell (a.k.a. Battery 209) on Outer Brewster Island in the Brewster Islands Military Reservation, and Battery 208 at the Fourth Cliff Military Reservation.

Two two-gun 155 mm (6.1 inch) batteries were emplaced in 1942 to quickly provide some defense at key points. These had towed guns on "Panama mounts", circular concrete platforms to support the guns. These were at the East Point Military Reservation in Nahant and the Sagamore Hill Military Reservation, in Sagamore Beach, Massachusetts at the northern entrance of the Cape Cod Canal. Another four-gun 155 mm battery was at the Salisbury Beach Military Reservation, in Salisbury, Massachusetts. The site was transferred to the Harbor Defenses of Portsmouth with the addition of a fire control structure for those defenses.

Additional 155 mm batteries in field positions were at Gloucester, Marblehead Neck, Red Rock in Lynn, Fort Heath, Fort Dawes, Fort Andrews, Rocky Point in Plymouth, and Race Point in Provincetown.

Four 90 mm gun Anti-Motor Torpedo Boat (AMTB) batteries were built in the Boston area. These had 90 mm dual-purpose (anti-surface and anti-aircraft) guns. Each battery was authorized two 90 mm guns on fixed mounts, two on towed mounts, and two single 40 mm Bofors guns, although the weapons on hand may have varied. These batteries were completed in 1943 at Fort Heath, Fort Standish, Fort Revere, and Great Brewster Island in the Brewster Islands Military Reservation.

As new defenses were built, and with little threat to the east coast from enemy air or surface raiders, the heavy weapons at Boston's Endicott-era forts were scrapped in 1942-43. Fort Warren's and Fort Heath's 12-inch guns were the last heavy Endicott weapons to be scrapped, in 1945. Of the 6-inch guns, only the two pairs of pedestal-mounted guns at Fort Andrews and Fort Standish were retained through the end of the war. The removal of most weapons and an Army-wide shift from a regimental to a battalion-based system meant organizational changes in the Boston area. On 23 February 1944 the 9th Coast Artillery was effectively disestablished, and on 7 October 1944 the 241st Coast Artillery was redesignated as the 187th and 241st Coast Artillery Battalions, which themselves were disestablished on 1 April 1945. Personnel from these units were absorbed by HD Boston.

Some of the Boston-area forts served as POW camps during World War II, notably Fort Andrews.

The US Navy also participated in defending the Massachusetts Bay area with net defenses and submarine-detecting indicator loops, including stations in Nahant (Station 1D), Gloucester (Station 1E), Scituate (Station 1C), and Provincetown.

Following mobilization in 1940 HD Boston was subordinate to First Army. On 24 December 1941 the Eastern Theater of Operations (renamed the Eastern Defense Command three months later) was established, with all east coast harbor defense commands subordinate to it, along with antiaircraft and fighter assets. This command was disestablished in 1946.

=== Post World War II ===
Following the war, it was soon determined that gun defenses were obsolete, and they were scrapped by the end of 1948, with remaining harbor defense functions turned over to the Navy. In 1950 the Coast Artillery Corps and all Army harbor defense commands were dissolved. Today the Air Defense Artillery carries the lineage of some Coast Artillery units. In the late 1940s antiaircraft gun sites were established in the US, first with 90 mm guns and later with 120 mm guns. In the Boston area some of these sites were at or near former Coast Artillery forts. Similarly, the Nike missile systems deployed in the 1950s and early 1960s used some former coastal forts as launch or radar sites, notably the East Point Military Reservation and Fort Strong.

== Present ==
As of 2016, the Boston-area forts run the gamut from good preservation to total demolition. Fort Independence is the most accessible and among the best-preserved, and is a public park with guided tours in the summer. It's one of the few well-preserved forts in the area with road access. The former East Point Military Reservation in Nahant is now the Marine Science Center of Northeastern University and is publicly accessible by road. The 16-inch battery in particular can be seen easily, thanks to a berm in front of it that was part of the later Nike missile site. Also in Nahant, Fort Ruckman is partly buried but still visible. Fort Banks in Winthrop is partly buried, but is sometimes open for events such as a Halloween haunted fort. Fort Heath in Winthrop is totally demolished and buried. Almost all of the forts on the harbor islands are part of the Boston Harbor Islands National Recreation Area, with a ferry system that provides access to most of the islands, except in winter. Fort Warren on George's Island is very well-preserved with guided tours that allow access to most of the fort. It's a rare example of an older fort with Endicott batteries added to it. Fort Standish on Lovells Island and Fort Andrews on Peddocks Island are also accessible by ferry. Fort Strong is not accessible; the bridge to Long Island was demolished in 2014 due to safety concerns, and as of 2016 there are no public activities on the island. Fort Revere in Hull (on the mainland) is preserved as Fort Revere Park; the 6-inch batteries are well-preserved but only traces remain of the Revolutionary War fort and the other Endicott Batteries were buried in the 1970s. Fort Duvall on Spinnaker Island has been partly built on as part of a gated community, probably with no public access; one 16-inch emplacement is still visible. Fort Dawes was completely demolished to make room for the Deer Island Waste Water Treatment Plant. The former Fourth Cliff Military Reservation in Scituate is now an Air Force recreation area with some public access; the World War II 6-inch battery and some fire control towers remain. There are numerous other fire control towers in the Boston area, mostly privately owned, with a few at Cape Ann as well.

== Coat of arms ==
- Blazon
  - Shield: Gules, the ship Mayflower under full sail Proper.
  - Crest: On a wreath Argent and Gules, a dexter arm embowed habited gray with white ruff grasping a staff with the flag of Bunker Hill attached all Proper.
  - Motto: PRIMA LIBERTATIS ACIE (In the First Line of Battle for Liberty).
- Symbolism: The shield is red for the Artillery. The Mayflower, the crest and the motto all tell of the historic background of the Boston district.
- Background: The coat of arms was initially approved in 1919 for the Coast Defenses of Boston. It was later approved for the 9th Coast Artillery Regiment on 6 May 1924. It was redesignated for the 9th Antiaircraft Artillery Gun Battalion on 6 December 1950.

== See also ==
- Seacoast defense in the United States
- Harbor Defense Command
- List of coastal fortifications of the United States
- List of military installations in Massachusetts
