= 9th Coast Artillery (United States) =

9th Coast Artillery Regiment
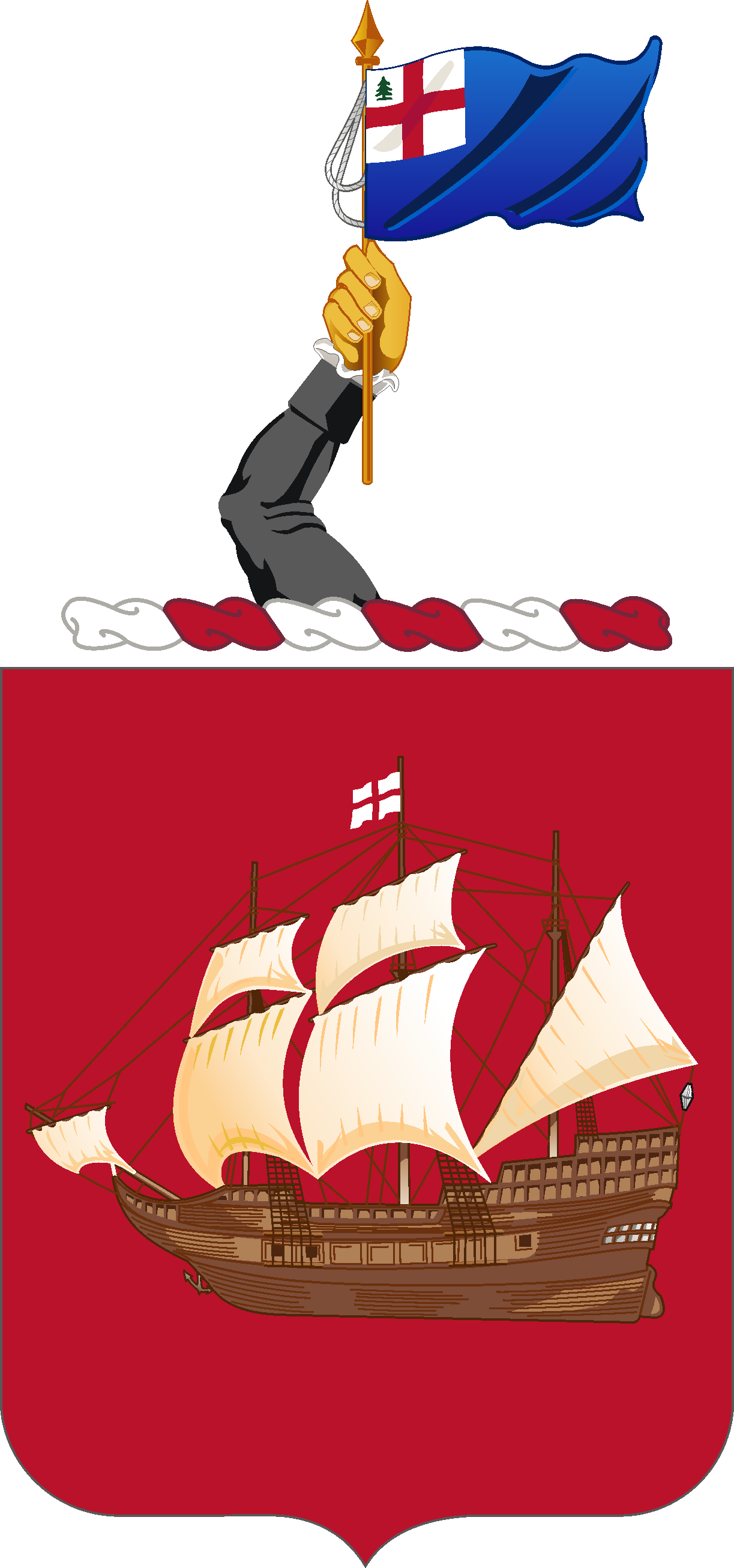
- Coat of arms
- Active: 1924 - 1944
- Country: United States
- Branch: Army
- Type: Coast artillery
- Role: Harbor defense
- Size: Regiment
- Part of: Harbor Defenses of Boston
- Motto(s): "Prima Libertatis Acie" (In the First Line of Battle for Liberty)
- Mascot(s): Oozlefinch

The 9th Coast Artillery Regiment was a Coast Artillery regiment in the United States Army.

== History ==
The 9th Coast Artillery was constituted 27 February 1924 and organized 1 July 1924 as the Regular Army component of the Harbor Defenses of Boston (HD Boston), Massachusetts until early 1944; the 241st Coast Artillery was the Massachusetts National Guard component of those defenses. On 23 February 1944 the 9th was relieved of this duty and soon deactivated as part of an Army-wide reorganization.

== Lineage ==
Constituted 27 February 1924 in the Regular Army as the 9th Coast Artillery (Harbor Defense) (HD) and organized as a Type B regiment at Fort Banks in HD Boston on 1 July 1924 from the following companies of the Coast Artillery Corps: 172nd, 59th, 113th, 120th, 136th, 137th, 177th, 178th, and 9th Coast Artillery band; only regimental headquarters and headquarters battery (HHB) and Batteries A and C activated.

- Batteries A and C inactivated 20 February 1930; HHB reduced to caretaking detachment.
- Battery A reactivated 1 July 1939 at Fort Banks and assigned to Fort Strong.
- Battery B activated 1 July 1940 at Fort Banks.
- HHBs of 1st and 2nd Battalions activated 10 February 1941 at Fort Warren and Fort Strong.
- Battery C activated at Fort Banks on 1 July 1940, assigned to Great Brewster Island on 19 July 1943.
- Batteries D and E activated at Fort Warren 1 July 1940. (Battery D assigned to Fort Dawes until redesignated Battery F and moved to Fort Warren on 2 October 1941, then redesignated HHB 3rd Battalion on 1 July 1942 and reassigned to Fort Ruckman).
- Battery F activated at Fort Strong 1 July 1940. On 2 October 1941 reassigned to a 155 mm battery at Salisbury Beach; redesignated Battery C 10 October 1941.
- On 1 June 1941 the regiment was reorganized as Type A and 3rd Battalion was activated as follows:
  - HHB 3rd Battalion activated 1 June 1941 at Fort Heath until 27 August 1941.
  - Batteries G and I activated at Fort Andrews 1 June 1941.
  - Battery H activated at Fort Banks 1 June 1941.
  - Battery K (searchlight) activated 1 June 1941, and assigned to various posts around Boston Harbor; on 8 March 1943 redesignated as an AA searchlight battalion and seacoast searchlights operated by regimental HHB.
- On 10 October 1941:
  - HHB 2nd Battalion redesignated HHB 1st Battalion on 10 October 1941
  - HHB regimental redesignated HHB 2nd Battalion
  - Battery C redesignated Battery D.
  - Battery D redesignated Battery F.
  - Battery F redesignated Battery C.
- On 8 March 1943 HHB 3rd Battalion and Batteries H, I, and K transferred to Fort Ruckman; also Battery G to East Point Military Reservation, Nahant, MA.
- On 23 February 1944 regimental assets absorbed by HD Boston and HHB reassigned to XXIII Corps at Fort Hood, Texas; departed 14 March 1944.
- disbanded 26 June 1944; personnel reassigned to five field artillery battalions.

== Distinctive unit insignia ==
- Description

A Gold color metal and enamel device 1 inch (2.54 cm) in height overall consisting of a shield blazoned: Gules bordered Or, the ship Mayflower, under full sail Proper.

- Symbolism

The shield is red for the Artillery. The Mayflower tells of the historic background of the Boston district.

- Background

The distinctive unit insignia was originally approved for the 9th Coast Artillery Regiment on 14 May 1924. It was redesignated for the 9th Antiaircraft Artillery Gun Battalion on 6 December 1950.

== Coat of arms ==
- Blazon
  - Shield: Gules, the ship Mayflower under full sail Proper.
  - Crest: On a wreath Argent and Gules, a dexter arm embowed habited gray with white ruff grasping a staff with the flag of Bunker Hill attached all Proper.
  - Motto: PRIMA LIBERTATIS ACIE (In the First Line of Battle for Liberty).
- Symbolism: The shield is red for the Artillery. The Mayflower, the crest and the motto all tell of the historic background of the Boston district.
- Background: The coat of arms was originally approved for the 9th Coast Artillery Regiment on 6 May 1924. It was redesignated for the 9th Antiaircraft Artillery Gun Battalion on 6 December 1950.

== Campaign streamers ==
none

== Decorations ==
none

== See also ==
- Seacoast defense in the United States
- United States Army Coast Artillery Corps
- Harbor Defense Command
- Distinctive unit insignia (U.S. Army)
