= John L. Tiernon =

U.S. Army brigadier general

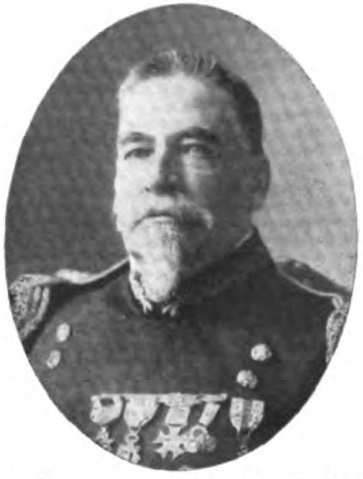
- From Volume VIII (1908) of The Union Army: A History of Military Affairs in the Loyal States 1861–65
- Born: January 18, 1841; Madison, Indiana, U.S.
- Died: March 30, 1910 (aged 69); Buffalo, New York, U.S.
- Burial place: Arlington National Cemetery
- Alma mater: St. Mary's Seminary (Perryville, Missouri)
- Spouse: Harriet Virginia Pickett (m. 1865–1910)
- Children: 2
- Relatives: Charles L. Phillips (son in law)
- Military career
- Allegiance: Union; United States
- Service: Union Army; United States Army
- Service years: 1862–1865 (Union); 1865–1903 (United States)
- Rank: Brigadier General
- Units: U.S. Field Artillery Branch; U.S. Army Coast Artillery Corps
- Commands: Battery B, 3rd Artillery Regiment; 1st Battalion, 3rd Artillery Regiment; Light Artillery Battalion, Manila; Manila Police; Fort Banks; Fort Winthrop; Boston Artillery District
- Wars: American Civil War; Spanish–American War; Philippine–American War
- Other work: Speaker of the Dakota Territory House of Representatives; Member of the Dakota Territory House of Representatives

John L. Tiernon (January 18, 1841 – March 30, 1910) was a career officer in the United States Army. A veteran of the American Civil War, Spanish–American War, and Philippine–American War, he was a Field Artillery officer who later specialized in Coast Artillery. Tiernon served from 1862 to 1903, and attained the rank of brigadier general.

== Early life ==
John Luke Tiernon (Note: Tiernon's name is often spelled in newspapers and documents as "Tiernan".) was born in Madison, Indiana on January 18, 1841, the son of Anthony Tiernon and Katherine (Sendelbach) Tiernon. He was raised and educated in St. Louis, Missouri, and graduated from St. Mary's Seminary in Perryville, Missouri.

In 1861, Tiernon moved to Fort Randall in the recently organized Dakota Territory. He won election to the House of Representatives in the first territorial legislature, and was the body's youngest member. When the Speaker of the House, George M. Pinney, resigned in early 1862, Tiernon was elected to complete his term.

As a supporter of the Union during the American Civil War, in the summer of 1862 Tiernon joined the Union Army. He was commissioned as a second lieutenant of Field Artillery, with a date of rank of February 19, and assigned to the 3rd Artillery Regiment.

== Start of career ==
During the Civil War, Tiernon served primarily in the western United States. He was provost marshal at Governors Island, New York. He was subsequently assigned as provost marshal for California and Nevada. When the army established Fort Reynolds on Angel Island, California in September 1863, it was garrisoned by Battery B, 3rd Artillery Regiment. As the battery's commander, Tiernon named the post in honor of John F. Reynolds, a Union Army general who had been killed at the Battle of Gettysburg. As the war neared its conclusion, Tiernon was reassigned to provost marshal duties in New Mexico Territory.

After the war, Tiernon remained in the service and served as assistant commissary of subsistence for the 3rd Heavy Artillery Regiment at Fort Independence, Massachusetts. In 1868, he was assigned as Ordnance officer on the staff of the newly organized U.S. Army Artillery School at Fort Monroe, Virginia. He was also enrolled as a student, and he graduated in April 1869. From 1874 to 1881, Tiernon served with the 3rd Artillery at Fort Porter and Fort Niagara, New York.

== Continued career ==
In 1881, he commanded Battery B, 3rd Artillery Regiment when it was assigned to Mount Vernon Barracks, Alabama, and he remained in command when the unit was posted to Fort Barrancas, Florida. From June to November 1883 and September to December 1884, Tiernon commanded the 3rd Artillery's Battery B and two other batteries during a training encampment at the maintenance shops of the East Tennessee, Virginia and Georgia Railway near Atlanta. In the late 1880s, Tiernon served with the 3rd Artillery when it was assigned to Newport Barracks, Kentucky. In the early to mid 1890s, he performed staff duty at the Fort Monroe garrison headquarters.

In 1894, Tiernon was in command of 1st Battalion, 3rd Artillery Regiment at Fort Monroe. During the Spanish–American War, Tiernon was posted to the New Jersey National Guard encampment at Sea Girt, New Jersey, where he served as mustering in officer for United States Volunteers during the army's wartime expansion. In April 1899, Tiernon was appointed to command the Light Artillery Battalion of Manila during the Philippine–American War. He was subsequently appointed as chief of the Manila police, and he served until returning to the United States in late 1901.

After his service in the Philippines, Tiernon was assigned to command Fort Banks and Fort Winthrop, Massachusetts and the Boston Artillery District. On August 12, 1903, he was promoted to brigadier general. He retired the following day.

== Effective dates of promotion ==
Tiernon's effective date of promotion were:

- Second Lieutenant, February 19, 1862
- First Lieutenant, February 19, 1864
- Captain, July 2, 1877
- Major, September 1, 1896
- Lieutenant Colonel, July 15, 1900
- Colonel, August 22, 1901
- Brigadier General, August 11, 1903
- Brigadier General (Retired), August 12, 1903

== Retirement and death ==
In retirement, Tiernon resided in Buffalo, New York. He belonged to several Union Army fraternal organizations, including the Military Order of the Loyal Legion of the United States and Grand Army of the Republic. In addition, he was a member of several Spanish–American War organizations, including the Army and Navy Union of the United States of America, Military Order of Foreign Wars, United Spanish War Veterans, and Society of the Eighth Army Corps. Tiernon was also Freemason, and was a member of the Buffalo Club.

Tiernon died in Buffalo on March 30, 1910. He was buried at Arlington National Cemetery.

== Family ==
Tiernon married Harriet Virginia Pickett (1846–1912) on February 1, 1865. They were the parents of two children, daughter Katherine (1869–1926) and son John L. Tiernon Jr. (1872–1945). Katherine Tiernon was the second wife of Brigadier General Charles L. Phillips. John Tiernon was a Buffalo-area attorney and insurance company executive.
