= Fourth Cliff Military Reservation =

- Part of Harbor Defenses of Boston
- Scituate, Massachusetts
- 6-inch gun at Fort Columbia State Park, Washington state, similar to Battery 208.

Site information
- Type: Coastal Defense
- Owner: Hanscom AFB, Massachusetts
- Controlled by: United States Air Force

Location
- Location in Massachusetts
- Coordinates: 42°09′35.34″N 70°42′20.05″W

Site history
- Built: 1942
- Built by: United States Army
- In use: 1942-Present
- Battles/wars: World War II

Garrison information
- Current commander: Hanscom Air Force Base
- Garrison: Scituate, Massachusetts

Fourth Cliff Military Reservation was a World War II coastal defense site located near Scituate, Massachusetts, USA. It is now a recreation area for Hanscom Air Force Base.

== History ==
The Fourth Cliff Military Reservation was built on private land during World War II, and was organizationally part of the Harbor Defenses of Boston. It consisted of an early radar, fire control towers, and artillery batteries and today, a combination of three one- and two-bedroom recreational lodging facilities. One battery of two 6-inch guns was built here, on shielded barbette carriages with a magazine and fire control bunker between them. It was known as Battery 208 and was completed in November 1944. A 16-inch gun battery, Battery 106, was planned for the Flowers Hill area but was never built. The guns were scrapped and the fort abandoned as a coast defense installation in 1948.

=== The site today ===
It is a 56-acre (230,000 m^{2}) seaside recreation area located in Humarock (near Scituate) on Massachusetts' South Shore. Fourth Cliff is in a superb location, sitting high on a cliff at the end of a peninsula, overlooking the Atlantic Ocean on one side and the scenic North River on the other. The site today consists of various buildings, a bunker, two fire control towers, a recreation hall, four 3-bedroom cottages, eleven 2-bedroom chalets, two townhouses, four efficiency units, eleven RV sites, a pavilion and spaces for tent camping. It is now operated by Hanscom Air Force Base as a military recreation area. The site is open only to service members, their families, guests, and Department of Defense civilians.

== See also ==
- Seacoast defense in the United States
- United States Army Coast Artillery Corps
- List of military installations in Massachusetts
