= East Point Military Reservation =

US military installation (1917–1962)

- Part of Harbor Defenses of Boston
- Nahant, Massachusetts

Site information
- Type: Coastal Defense
- Owner: Massachusetts
- Controlled by: United States Army

Location
- Location in Massachusetts
- Coordinates: 42°25′11.98″N 70°54′35.85″W

Site history
- Built: 1917
- Built by: United States Army
- In use: 1917–62
- Battles/wars: World War I World War II; Cold War

Garrison information
- Garrison: Nahant, Massachusetts

East Point Military Reservation was a World War I and World War II coastal defense site located in Nahant, Massachusetts. In 1955–62 it was a Nike missile launch site. In 1967 the site was converted into the Marine Science Center of Northeastern University.

== History ==
The East Point Military Reservation was originally acquired by the US Army from the Lodge family in 1917. It originally consisted of a searchlight and an observation post. The site was planned to be named Fort Henry Cabot Lodge for the prominent senator on whose land part of the facility was built, but this was never acted upon.

=== The site today ===
The site today consists of towers, the foundations of buildings, and bunkers formerly for guns and ammunition.

== East Point Batteries ==
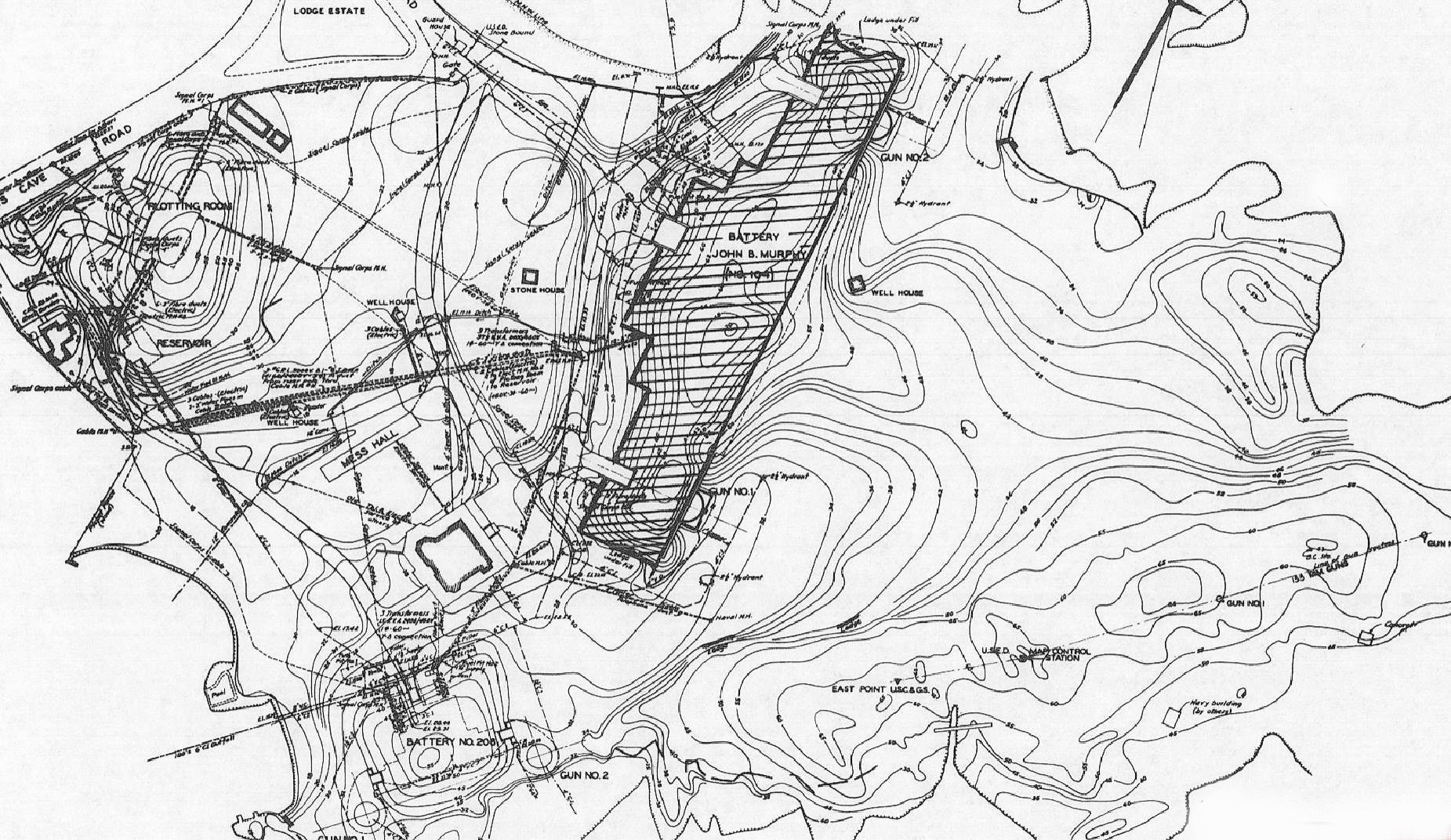
A 1945 map of the East Point gun batteries.

The East Point Batteries, located in Nahant, Massachusetts, were part of the Harbor Defenses of Boston during World War II. Three separate gun batteries were built: Battery Murphy (two 16-inch guns), Battery 206 (two 6-inch guns), and a temporary 2-gun battery of 155 mm artillery. Along with these guns were three related fire control towers: two on Swallow Cave Rd. and one on Nahant Rd., plus a large underground plotting room behind Battery Murphy that served that battery's two big guns. In addition, to the north were fire control towers at 291 Ocean Avenue in Marblehead and Smiths Point in Manchester. Also, the northern series of Navy-operated magnetic loop cables, emplaced to detect enemy vessels (particularly U-boats) approaching Boston Harbor, terminated on the shore just southeast of the two 155 mm gun positions. This was indicator loop Station 1D. All of these facilities were located in the area called East Point, at the extreme southeast end of the Nahant tombolo, as shown in the map at right. After 1943, these guns, together with the two 12-inch guns of Battery Gardner at Fort Ruckman, made Nahant the most heavily armed portion of Boston's coast defenses.

=== The Guns ===
Battery Murphy was one of a series of 16-inch gun emplacements that were installed near U.S. harbors before and during World War II. Construction on this battery commenced on 23 January 1942 and was completed just under two years later, on 18 December 1943. The guns were 16-inch Navy MkIIMI guns on M4 barbette carriages with a range of 45,150 yards (41,290 m). The guns were housed in casemates, part of a large bunker for magazines and fire control equipment.

Battery 206 was a 6-inch gun battery of a type designed to complement the World War II 16-inch batteries. The battery was built in 1942–43, concurrently with Battery Murphy. It consisted of two 6-inch M1903 guns on long-range shielded barbette carriages, with a range of 27,100 yards (24,800 m). A large bunker between the guns housed magazines and fire control equipment.

The battery of two 155mm guns was made up of 155 mm M1918 towed guns emplaced on so-called "Panama mounts", 10-foot diameter concrete pads surrounded by circular steel rails 40 feet in diameter that carried the trails of the guns.

The platform for 155 mm Gun 1 as it looked in 2010.

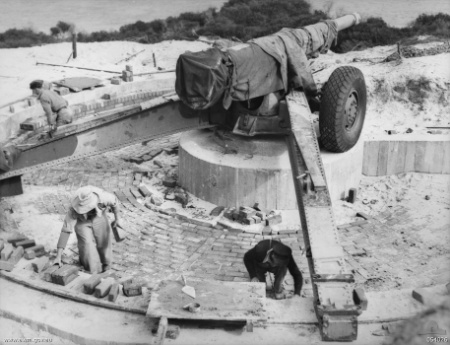
A 155 mm gun like those at Nahant being emplaced.

This battery was a stopgap measure, put in place quickly between March and May 1942, as an emergency defense against enemy ships and submarines while the batteries of larger guns and their related fire control towers were being built. From the extreme southeast end of East Point, these guns, with their 12-mile maximum range, could command the entire ocean front of Boston Harbor and could reach all the way south to Hingham, Massachusetts.

The guns, which could be fired rapidly, were mounted roughly 250 feet apart, and a small, wooden Battery Commander's station, containing a depression position finder and a coincidence range finder was built between them. (See the image gallery below for plans and dimensions of this battery.) This 155 mm gun battery is believed to have been the only one of its type in the Boston Harbor defenses, and the surviving platform of Gun 1 is thought to be relatively rare in New England.

=== Fire Control Structures ===
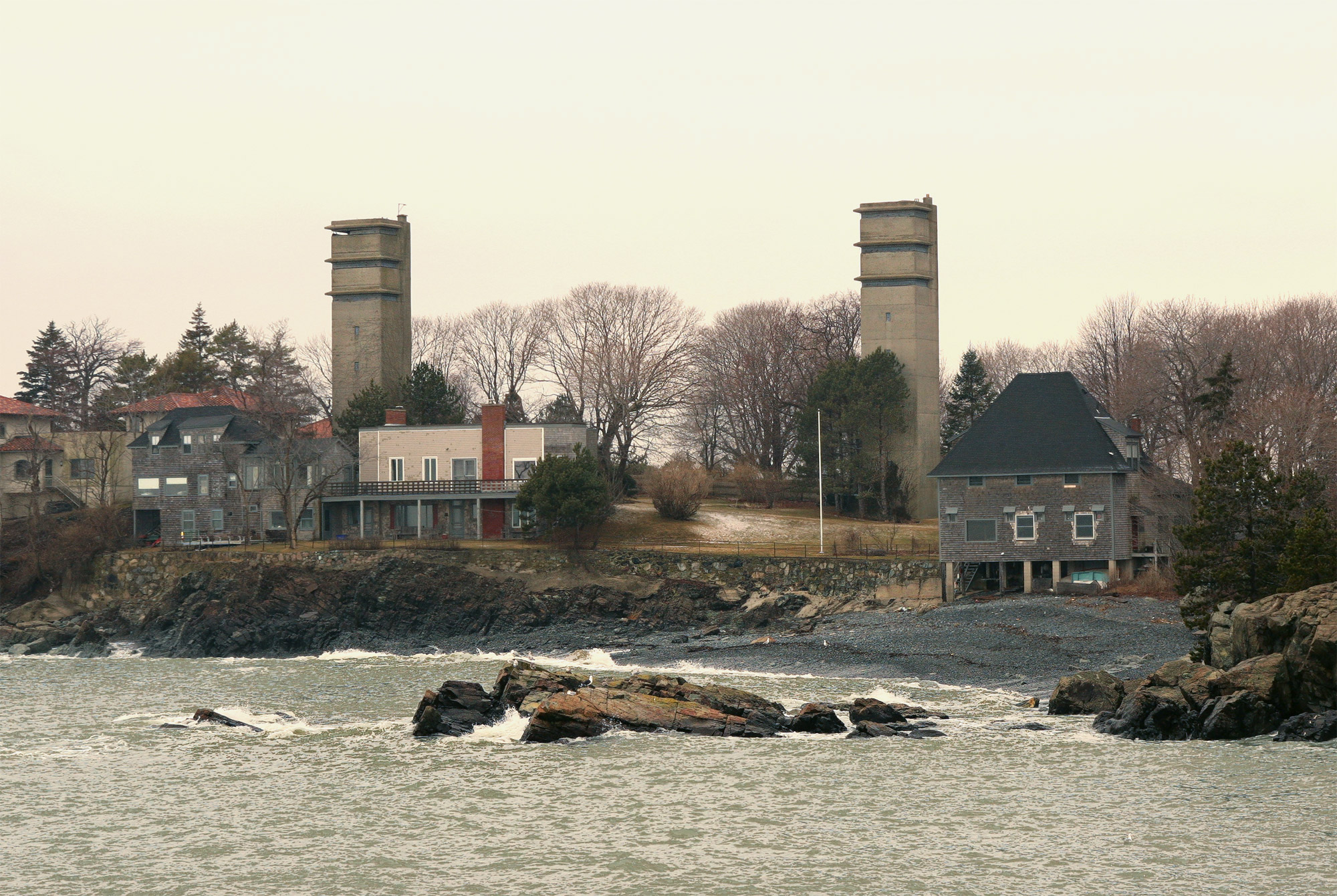
The twin fire control towers on Swallow Cave Road.

In addition to having one of the largest concentrations of coast artillery in New England, East Point featured the largest concentration of fire control towers, used to direct and correct the fire of these guns.

== Postwar use ==
In 1948 the guns were removed and the site ceased to be a coast defense installation. In 1952–56 a four-gun 90 mm anti-aircraft battery was at the site. In 1955–62 the site was Nike missile site B-17L or B-17C. Northeastern University acquired the property in 1967.

East Point Reservation served as a filming location for the 2010 film Shutter Island.

=== Gallery of Additional Images ===
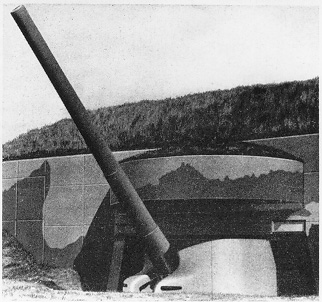
16-inch casemated gun, similar to Battery Murphy.

6-inch gun at Fort Columbia State Park, Washington state, similar to Battery 206.

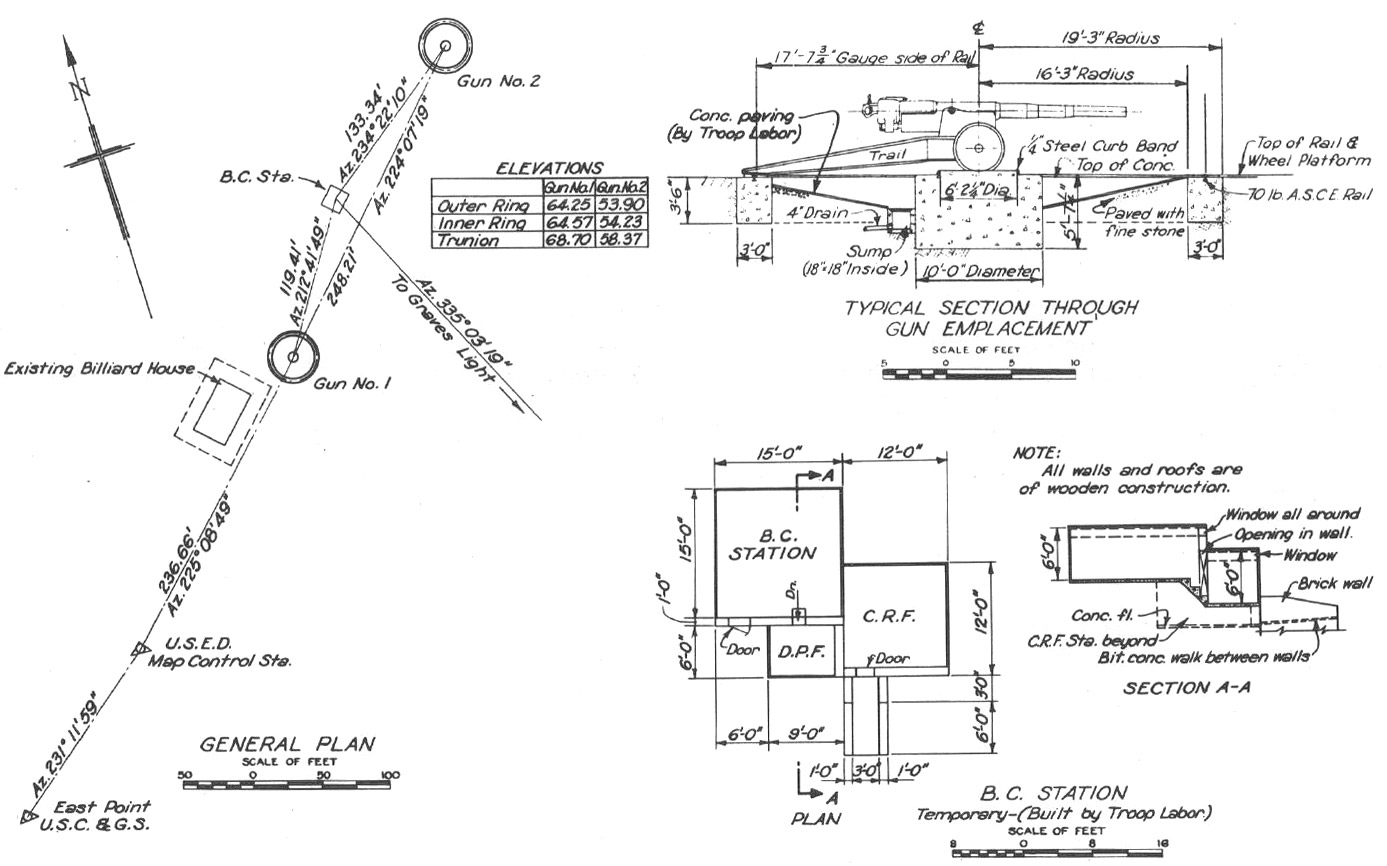
1942 plans relating to the 155mm guns.

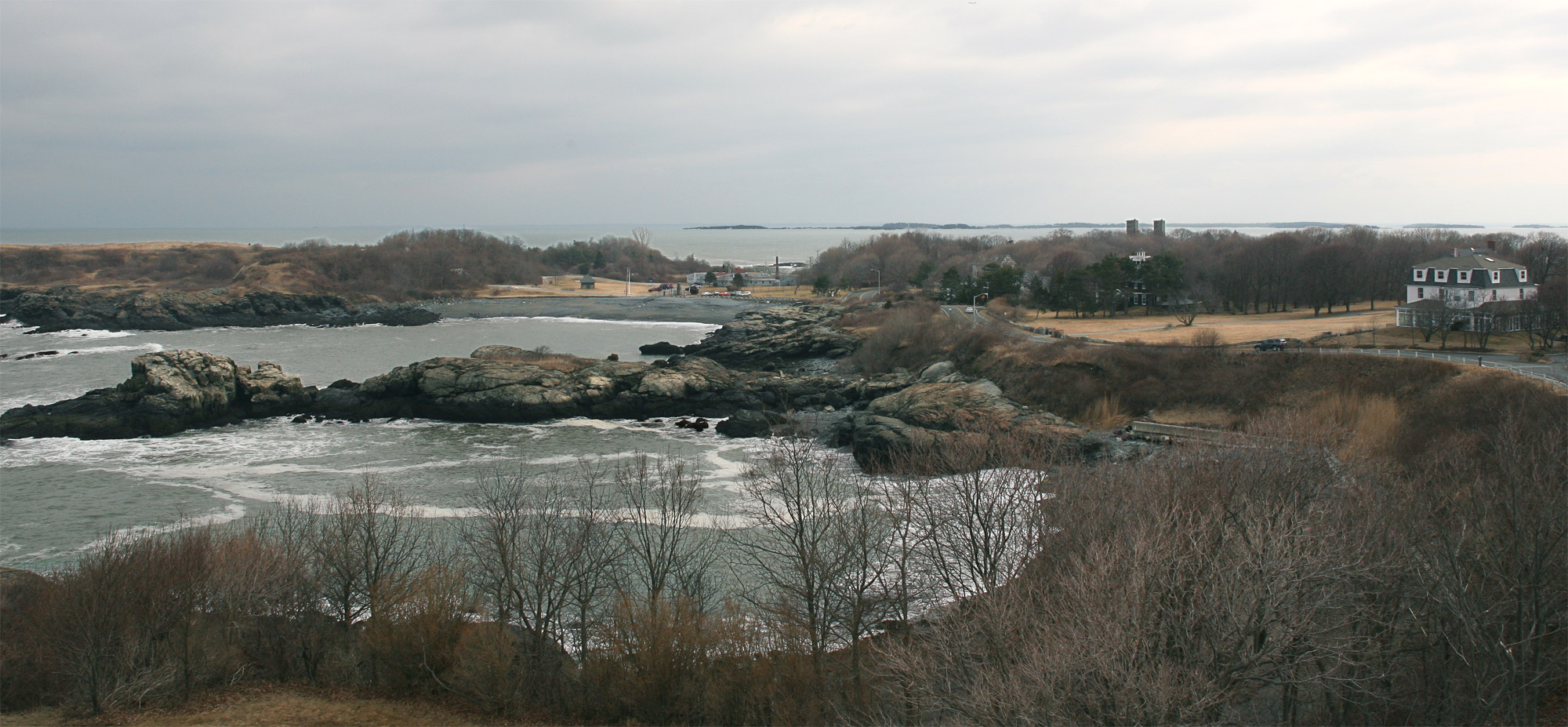
The view south from the fire control tower on Nahant Road.

== See also ==
- 9th Coast Artillery (United States)
- 241st Coast Artillery (United States)
- Seacoast defense in the United States
- United States Army Coast Artillery Corps
- List of military installations in Massachusetts
