= Fort Dawes =

- Part of Harbor Defenses of Boston
- Deer Island, Boston, Massachusetts

Site information
- Type: Coastal Defense
- Owner: Massachusetts
- Controlled by: Deer Island Waste Water Treatment Plant
- Open to the public: no

Location
- Location in Massachusetts
- Coordinates: 42°20′56.02″N 70°57′23.36″W

Site history
- Built: 1942
- Built by: United States Army
- In use: 1942-1946
- Demolished: ca 1991
- Battles/wars: World War II

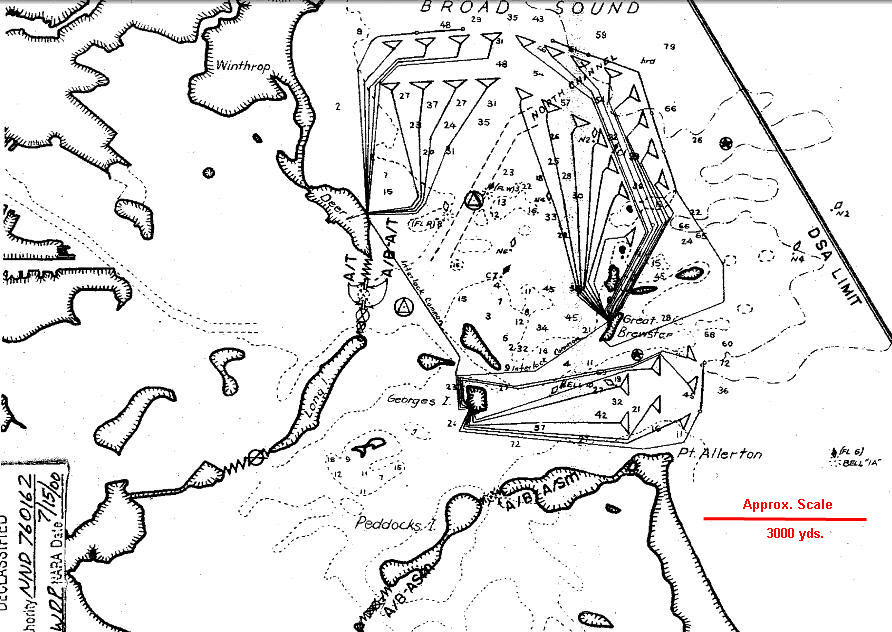
A 1945 map of the mine fields protecting Boston Harbor during World War II. Fort Dawes is on Deer Island in the upper center.

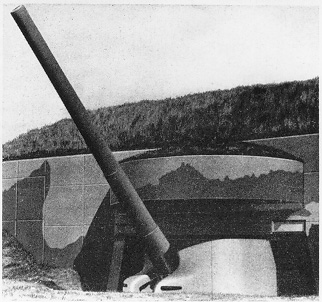
16-inch casemated gun, similar to Battery 105.

6-inch gun at Fort Columbia State Park, Washington state, similar to Battery 207.

Fort Dawes was a World War II Coast Artillery fort located on Deer Island in Winthrop/Boston, Massachusetts. It was part of the Harbor Defenses of Boston.

== History ==
The site's military history began in 1906 as the Deer Island Military Reservation, acquired for fire control and mine field control as part of the Taft program.

During World War II, Fort Dawes was initially the site of a target detection radar for the harbor defenses and Battery Taylor (two 3-inch M1902 guns moved from nearby Fort Strong), both completed by late 1942. Also in 1942, construction began on Anti-Motor Torpedo Boat Battery (AMTB) 944, with two fixed and two towed 90 mm guns, along with the Harbor Entrance Control Post (HECP) for Boston Harbor--the installation that kept track of all vessels entering and leaving the harbor. AMTB 944 replaced Battery Taylor in October 1943, whose guns were placed in storage at that time. By 1945 Fort Dawes had a mine casemate controlling some of the mines guarding the northern approach to Boston Harbor.

Fort Dawes can also lay claim to the largest collection of "artillery that never was" in the harbor defenses of Boston. Battery 105 and Battery 207 began construction in 1942. Battery 105 was completed as a large bunker housing magazines and fire control for two 16-inch guns, like those at Battery Murphy in Nahant and generally similar to the guns of Battery Long at Fort Duvall. By the time the emplacements had been finished, however, WW2 was being won, and the need for the battery was deemed to have passed, so it was never armed. The nearby battery of two 6-inch guns, Battery 207, was also never equipped with guns, for the same reason.

In 1946 AMTB 944 was disarmed, and within a few years the site was abandoned.

However, in the summer of 1956 or perhaps a bit longer, the airfield was used to run flights testing the new ideas of air traffic control. A small radar was installed there and used to track flights to determine if an airplane could be directed to follow a predetermined path. Prof. Eugenio Calabi was advisor on the project.

In the early 1990s all of the military facilities on Deer Island were demolished and the earth stripped away for the construction of the Deer Island Waste Water Treatment Plant. All vestiges of Fort Dawes were destroyed.

== See also ==
- 9th Coast Artillery (United States)
- Seacoast defense in the United States
- United States Army Coast Artillery Corps
- List of military installations in Massachusetts
