= Calf Island Military Reservation =

World War II coastal defense site in Massachusetts, US

- Part of Harbor Defenses of Boston
- Hull, Massachusetts
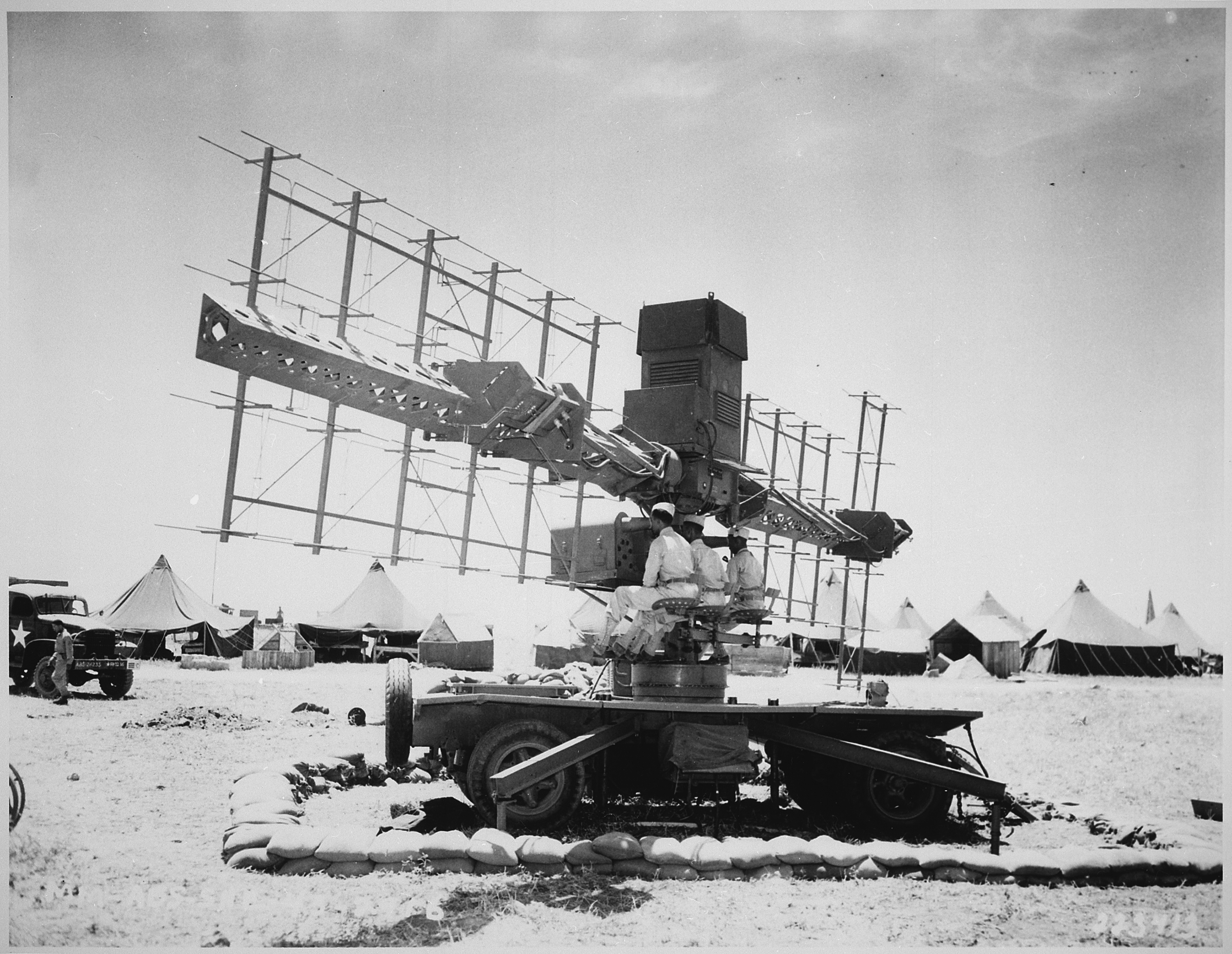
- SCR-268 radar in Casablanca, Morocco in WWII

Site information
- Type: Coastal Defense
- Owner: Massachusetts
- Controlled by: Boston Harbor Islands National Recreation Area

Location
- Location in Massachusetts
- Coordinates: 42°20′23.80″N 70°53′46.17″W

Site history
- Built: 1941
- Built by: United States Army
- In use: 1941–1946
- Battles/wars: World War II

Calf Island Military Reservation was a World War II coastal defense site located on Calf Island in Hull, Massachusetts.

== History ==
In 1920 there was a proposal to build a naval-type turret with two 16-inch guns on Great Brewster Island, but this was not implemented. Calf Island was also considered, but the battery was finally built (without a turret) as Fort Duvall.

The Calf Island Military Reservation was built in 1941 on state land. It consisted of an early SCR-268 radar, searchlight station, and an observation post. It was returned to the state in 1946.

=== The site today ===
The site today consists of the foundation of the observation tower.

== See also ==
- Seacoast defense in the United States
- United States Army Coast Artillery Corps
- List of military installations in Massachusetts
