= Brewster Islands Military Reservation =

Coastal defense site in Boston Harbor, Massachusetts, USA

- Part of Harbor Defenses of Boston
- Boston Harbor, Massachusetts
- 6-inch gun at Fort Columbia State Park, Washington state, similar to Battery Jewell

Site information
- Type: Coastal Defense
- Owner: Massachusetts
- Controlled by: Boston Harbor Islands National Recreation Area

Location
- Location in Massachusetts
- Coordinates: 42°20′30.41″N 70°52′39.65″W

Site history
- Built: 1941
- Built by: United States Army
- In use: 1941–1947
- Battles/wars: World War II

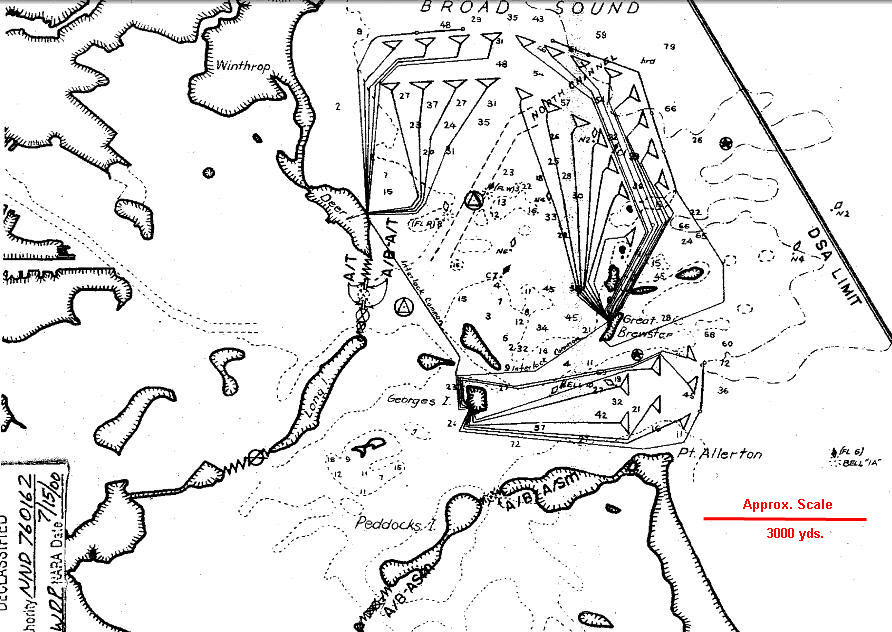
A 1945 map of the mine fields protecting Boston Harbor during World War II

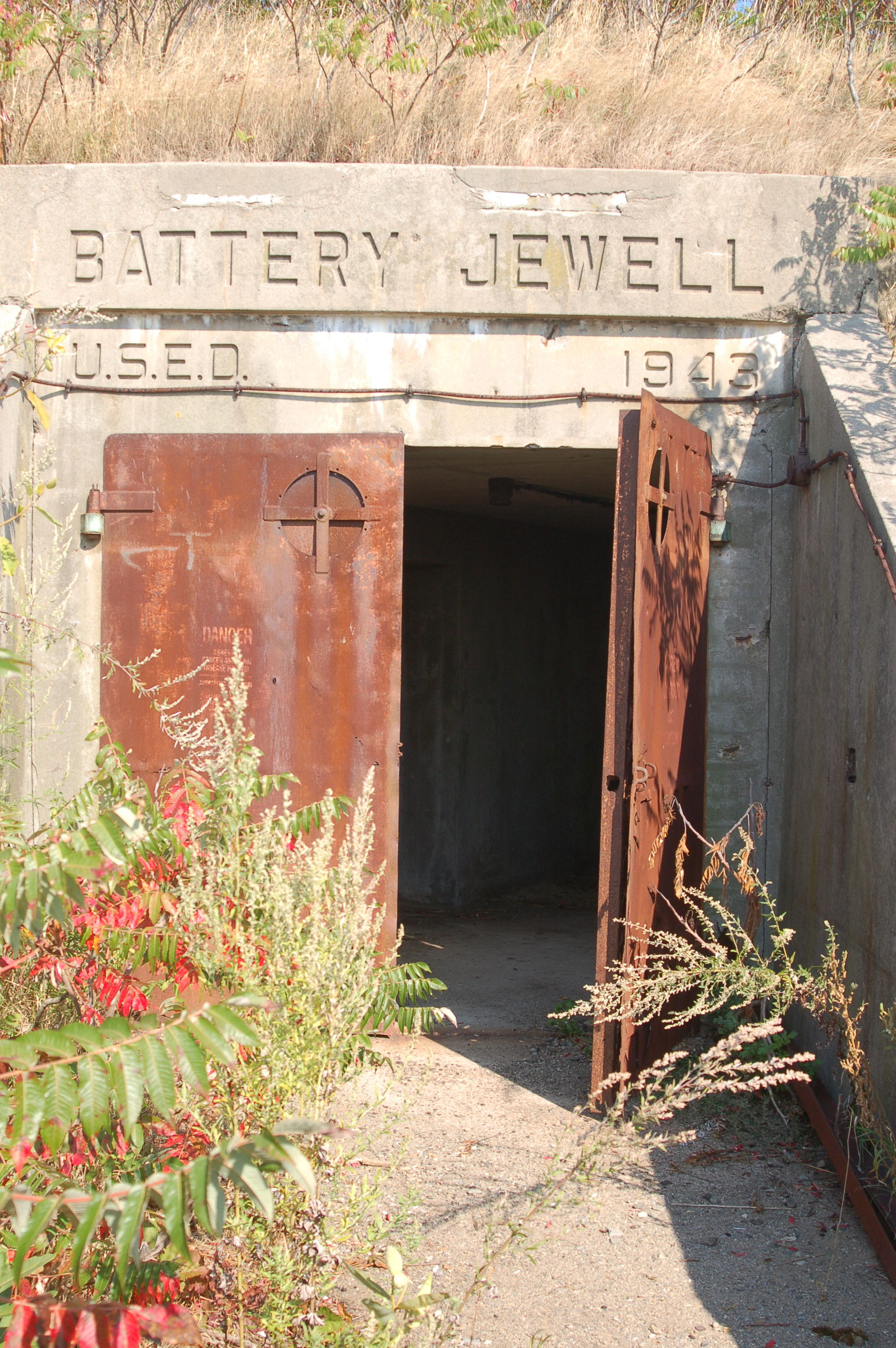
Battery Jewell's bunker, constructed during WWII

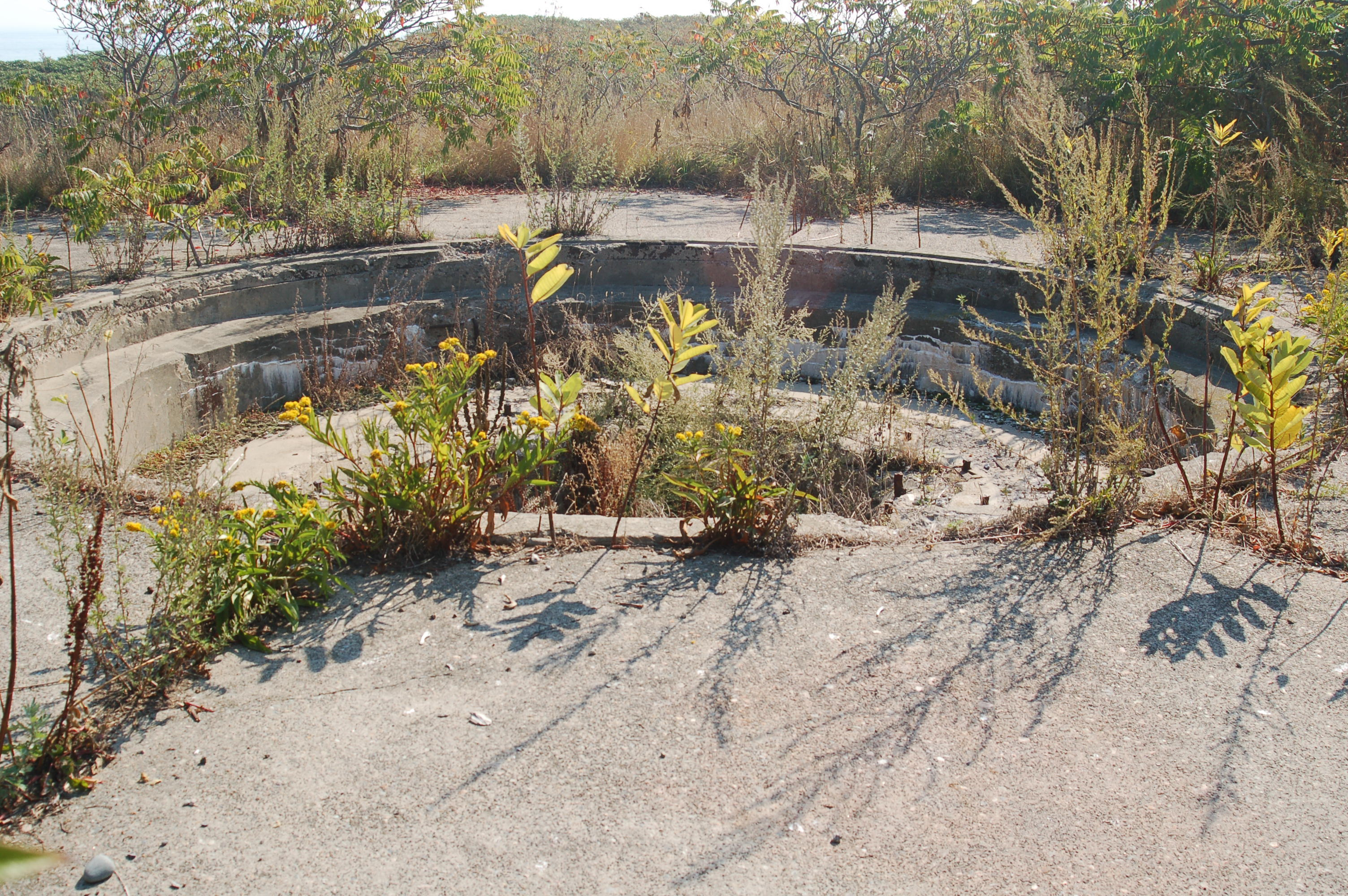
Battery Jewell's #2 gun emplacement

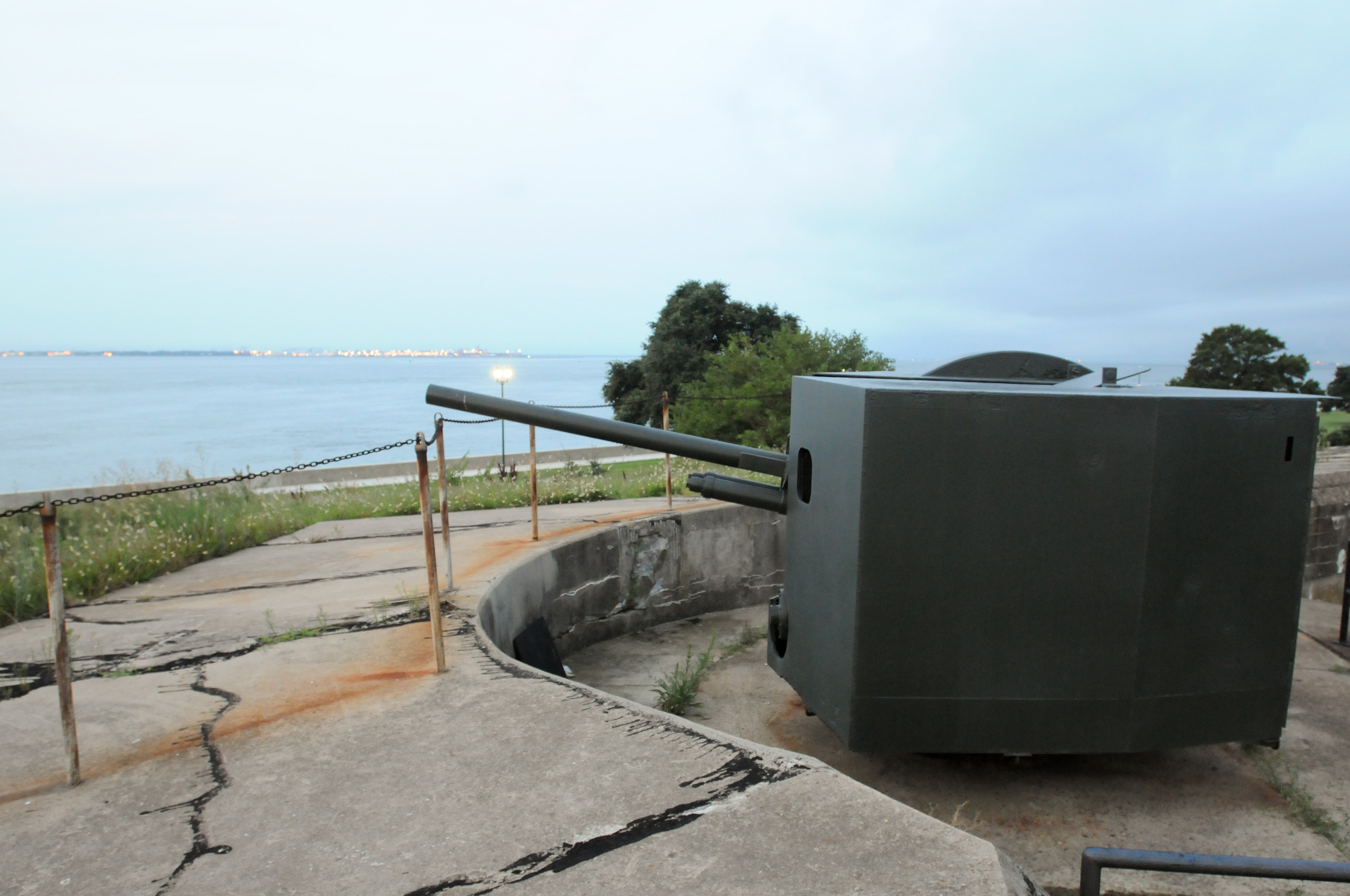
90 mm M1 gun on T3/M3 fixed seacoast mount at Fort Monroe, Virginia

Brewster Islands Military Reservation was a coastal defense site located on Great Brewster Island and Outer Brewster Island in Boston Harbor, Massachusetts, as part of the Harbor Defenses of Boston.

== History ==
Outer Brewster Island was acquired by the US government in 1913, followed by Great Brewster Island in 1917. In 1920 there was a proposal to build a naval-type turret with two 16-inch guns on Great Brewster Island, but this was not implemented. Calf Island Military Reservation was also considered, but the battery was finally built (without a turret) as Fort Duvall. The Brewster Islands Military Reservation was built in World War II on these islands. Its mission was to protect Boston Harbor from possible air and naval attack. It never fired its guns, but it did play an important part in the defense of the harbor.

=== Great Brewster Island ===
This island had an observation post and mine casemate for controlling a minefield in the harbor. The island also had an Anti-Motor Torpedo Boat Battery (AMTB), called AMTB 942. This AMTB battery had an authorized strength of four 90 mm guns, two on fixed mounts and two on towed mounts, as well as two towed 37 mm guns. The facility on Great Brewster Island may have been renamed Camp Prescott in 1943.

=== Outer Brewster Island ===
This island had a battery of two 6-inch M1 guns on long-range shielded carriages, with a large magazine and fire control bunker between them. The battery was initially called Battery 209, but later named Battery Jewell. A fire control tower and an SCR-296 radar were also on the island.

=== Present ===
The site today consists of the foundations of buildings and gun mounts, and the bunker of Battery Jewell. At Great Brewster the AMTB Battery is falling off the head which gets smaller by the year. The "M" Mine Observation Station was destroyed by the Navy for safety.

== See also ==
- Seacoast defense in the United States
- United States Army Coast Artillery Corps
- List of military installations in Massachusetts
