= 241st Coast Artillery (United States) =

241st Coast Artillery Regiment
- Active: 1924 – 1944
- Country: United States
- Branch: Army
- Type: Coast artillery
- Role: Harbor defense
- Size: Regiment
- Part of: Harbor Defenses of Boston
- Garrison/HQ: Fort Dawes; Fort Heath; Fort Banks
- Motto(s): Vigilantia
- Mascot(s): Oozlefinch

The 241st Coast Artillery Regiment was a Coast Artillery Corps regiment in the Massachusetts National Guard. It garrisoned the Harbor Defenses of Boston (HD Boston), Massachusetts 1924–1944.

== History ==
The 241st Coast Artillery regiment, Massachusetts National Guard was organized on 13 December 1636 as the South Regiment. By 1861 it was designated as the 1st Regiment of Infantry, Massachusetts Volunteer Militia. After serving in the Civil War as the 1st, it was redesignated and reorganized as the 1st Regiment of Heavy Artillery; the first coast artillery regiment in the National Guard. The 1st was mobilized for service in 1898 as the garrison for Fort Warren. As the 1st Coast Defense Command, the unit was mobilized for World War I service and provided batteries for the harbor defenses of Boston and for the 55th Artillery which served in France. The organization was reorganized as the 241st Coast Artillery regiment in 1923. The 241st was mobilized on 16 September 1940 prior to Pearl Harbor for duty as part of the harbor defenses of Boston. The regiment was broken up in 1944 as separate battalions. Its lineage passed to the 704th Antiaircraft Battalion in 1948. In 1959, the 241st Artillery (later the 241st Air Defense Artillery) was reorganized as a Nike unit with two battalions. In 1974, the 241st was redesignated as the 241st Field Artillery. It consolidated with the 101st Field Artillery regiment in 1975. The 101st carries the lineage of the 241st.

== Lineage ==
The regiment's lineage originated with the 1st Infantry Regiment, Massachusetts National Guard (MANG), organized in 1878. Redesignated the 1st Regiment Heavy Artillery, MANG on 15 June 1897. Redesignated the 1st Heavy Artillery, Massachusetts Volunteers 9 May 1898, stationed at various forts in Massachusetts, and mustered out 14 November 1898. Reorganized and redesignated Coast Artillery Corps, MANG in 1905. Following the American entry into World War I in April 1917, called into federal service 25 July 1917 and redesignated 16th through 27th companies, Coast Defenses of Boston. Elements served with the 55th Artillery (Coast Artillery Corps) in France. Reorganized in 1920 as the 1st Coast Defense Command, CAC MANG.

Organized 30 April 1924 by redesignating the 241st Artillery, Coast Artillery Corps (previously the 1st Coast Defense Command), Massachusetts National Guard.

On 16 September 1940 the regiment was inducted into federal service and moved to Fort Andrews 23 September 1940. On 12 December 1941 the HQ moved to Fort Dawes; moved to Fort Heath in November 1943.

In September 1943 the 4th Battalion of the 241st transferred to the Harbor Defenses of Portland, Maine and was redesignated as the 3rd Battalion, 8th Coast Artillery, with Batteries K and M of the 241st becoming Batteries G and H of the 8th.

The regimental HQ moved to Fort Banks in March 1944.

On 7 October 1944 the regiment was broken up into the 187th and 241st Coast Artillery Battalions (at Fort Ruckman and Fort Warren, respectively), which were deactivated 1 April 1945.

== See also ==
- Seacoast defense in the United States
- United States Army Coast Artillery Corps
- Harbor Defense Command
