= Governors Island (Massachusetts) =

Island in Boston Harbor, Massachusetts

Coordinates: 42°21′07″N 71°00′28″W

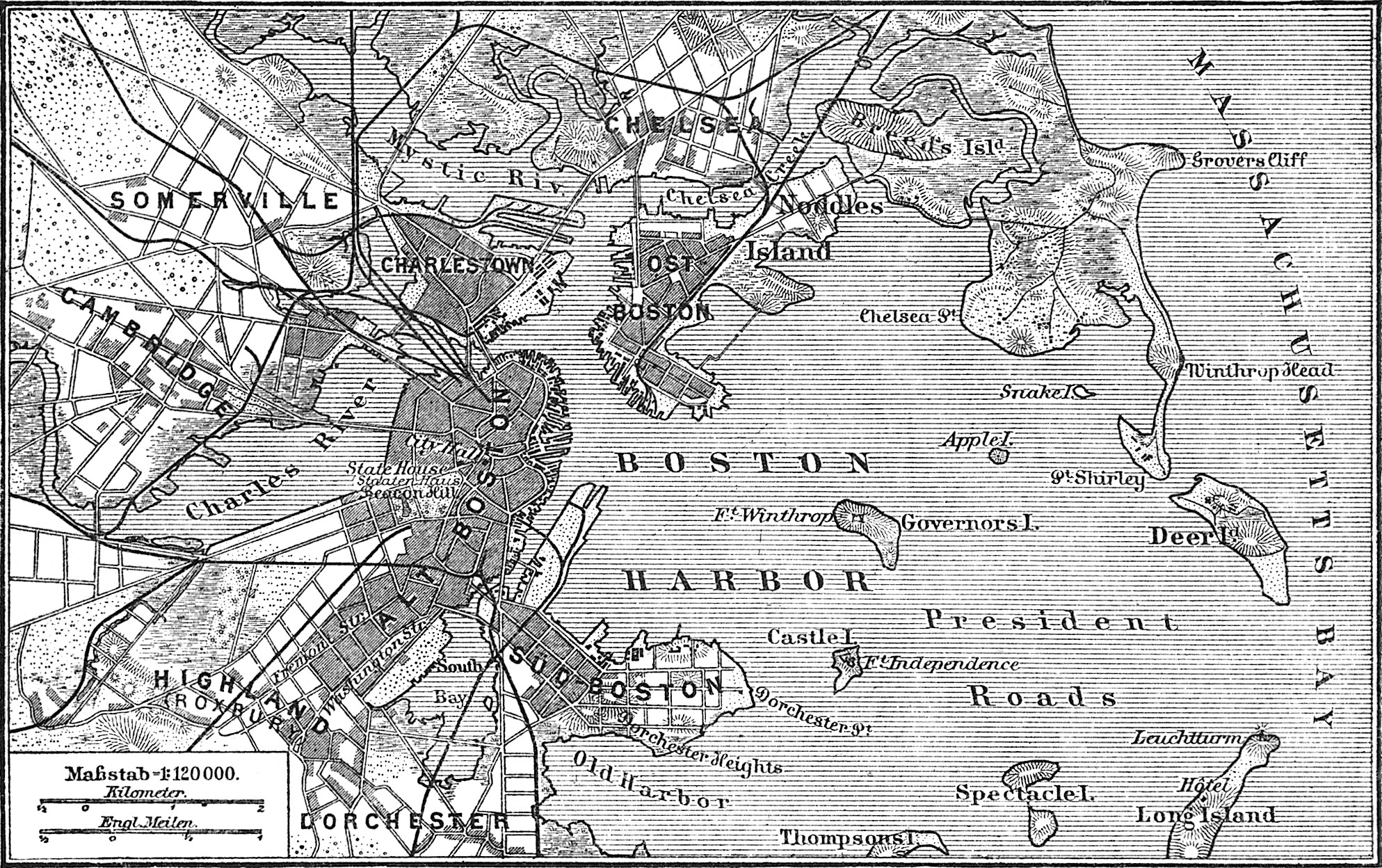
1890 map of Boston Harbor showing Governors Island before the airport was built.

Governors Island was an island in Boston Harbor in the U.S. state of Massachusetts. The island was subsumed by land reclamation for the construction and extension of Logan International Airport.

Governor's Island was originally owned by early Massachusetts founder Roger Conant, and known as Conant's Island. Conant grew grapes there, and very likely his vineyard is what Rev. John White referred to "as good as any are found in France by human culture," with some being "four inches around."

Governor's Island was the site of Fort Winthrop, a defensive fortification named after Governor John Winthrop, whose family was granted the island in 1632 and owned it until 1808, when it was acquired for the construction of the fort. It was also the site of La Tour's 1643 landing on a diplomatic mission to the Massachusetts Bay Colony during his conflict with d'Aulnay.

The island is buried in the area north of the south end of runway 14/32.
