= Fort Ruckman =

- Part of Harbor Defenses of Boston
- Nahant, Massachusetts
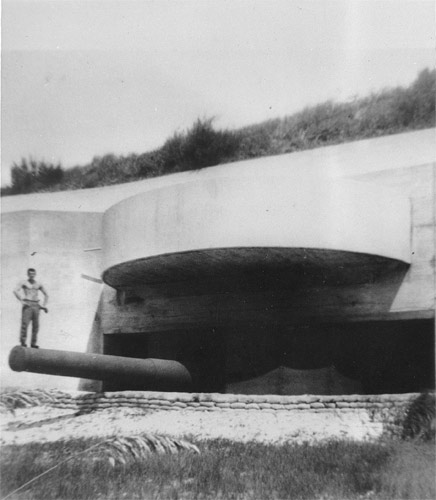
- A casemated 12-inch gun like those at Fort Ruckman.

Site information
- Type: Coastal Defense
- Owner: Massachusetts
- Controlled by: Town of Nahant
- Open to the public: yes
- Condition: partly buried

Location
- Location in Massachusetts
- Coordinates: 42°25′14.25″N 70°55′48.86″W

Site history
- Built: 1924
- Built by: United States Army
- In use: 1924-1946
- Battles/wars: World War II

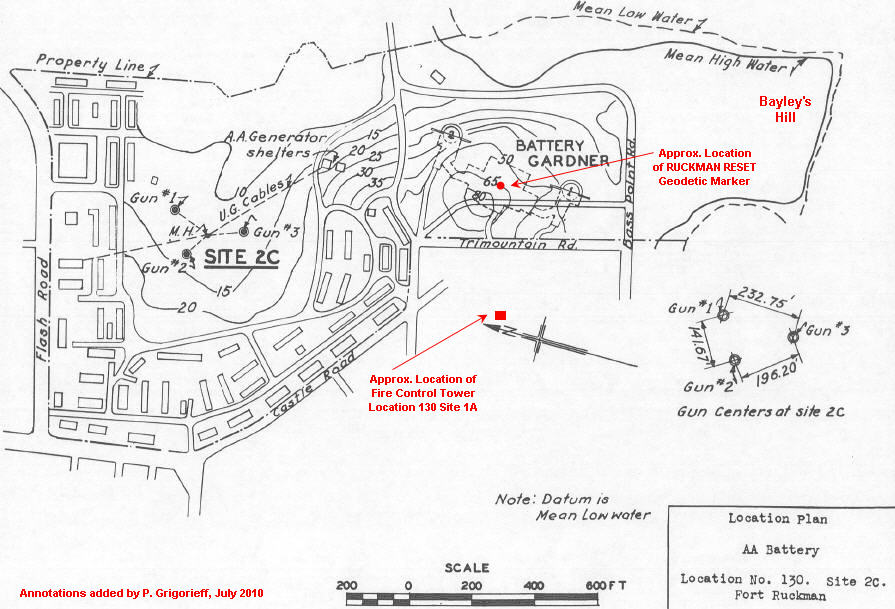
A 1945 map of the fort. The elongated structures shown are temporary World War II buildings.

Fort Ruckman was a U.S. Coast Artillery fort located in Nahant, Massachusetts. Originally called the Nahant Military Reservation, the fort was laid out in 1904-1907 and covered an area of about 45 acres just northwest of Bass Point, on the southwest side of the Nahant peninsula. During the 1920s, this area was renamed in honor of Maj. Gen. John Wilson Ruckman, a former Colonel in the Coast Artillery.

The fort was decommissioned after World War II and the property was sold to the town and to private owners beginning in about 1947. The fire control tower indicated on the map was used as part of the Army/Lincoln Labs Nike program-related radar research and development during the late 1940s and early 1950s and at one point had a large radar antenna on its roof. A Nike target tracking radar was also erected on Bayley's Hill (the eastern edge of the fort) during the 1950s.

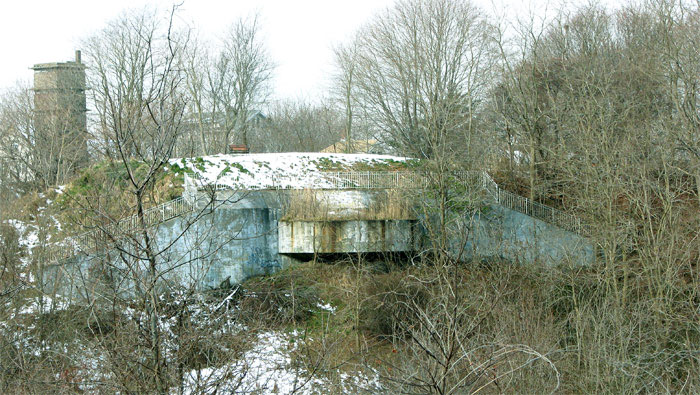
One of the two 12-inch gun positions and a fire control tower (at left) for Battery Gardner at Ft. Ruckman.

The geodetic disk (PID MY0039) set in the ground above the galleries of Battery Gardner at Fort Ruckman. Its approximate position is marked on the map above.

During World War II, Fort Ruckman was part of the Harbor Defenses of Boston, and housed the Group Command post for the northern district of the harbor defense artillery and Battery Gardner, two 12-inch guns in east-facing casemates of reinforced concrete. These casemates were built just before WW2 over the open (surface) gun positions originally completed in 1923.

The guns were the 12-inch M1895 gun, on Model 1917 long-range barbette carriages. When they were installed, these were the largest caliber guns in the harbor defenses. Each gun a total weight of 151 tons and had a maximum range of about 29,300 yards (about 16.6 miles). This would enable the guns, for example, to cover an arc extending from Gloucester in the north to North Scituate in the south. The centers of the two gun positions are roughly 425 ft. apart.

Today, most of the area within the fort's World War II boundaries has been converted into residential real estate, recreation, or park land for the Town of Nahant. The extensive concrete galleries between the north and south firing positions which housed fire control activities, ammunition storage, and crew quarters, have been buried under 20 or so feet of earth during the casemate construction process. These subterranean galleries are still accessible and are used by the Town for storage.

On the surface of the buried galleries are a series of large and smaller concrete chimneys that ventilate the galleries below. A geodetic marker, MY0039—RUCKMAN RESET (see photo at left), was emplaced in 1943, likely as a point of reference for aiming the 12" guns.

About 800 ft. NNW of the northernmost gun position of Battery Gardner lay the center of a 3-gun battery of antiaircraft guns known as Location 130-2C, or the Boston Harbor No.4 AAA Battery. The three guns were surface-mounted, standard barbette carriage 3" guns, Model 1917A2. The gun centers formed a roughly equilateral triangle 150 ft. on a side. The gun positions were constructed in 1934, but were not armed until 1942. Final construction on the battery commenced on May 5, 1942, and was completed in less than a month. Today, the battery positions appear (from Google maps) to have been destroyed, but the center point of the battery would fall roughly at the left field foul pole of the first baseball field southeast of the corner of Castle and Flash Roads.

== See also ==
- 9th Coast Artillery (United States)
- 241st Coast Artillery (United States)
- Seacoast defense in the United States
- United States Army Coast Artillery Corps
- List of military installations in Massachusetts
