= 55th Air Defense Artillery Regiment =

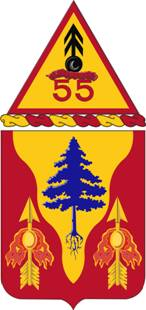
- Coat of arms
- Active: 1917–1989 2025-present
- Country: USA
- Branch: Army
- Type: Air defense artillery
- Motto: VIGILANTIA (Vigilance)
- Branch color: Scarlet
- Mascot: Oozlefinch
- Decorations: Presidential Unit Citation

Insignia
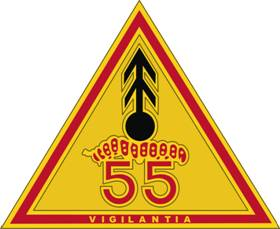
- Distinctive unit insignia

The 55th Air Defense Artillery Regiment is an Air Defense Artillery regiment of the United States Army that was first constituted in 1917 in the Regular Army. It was previously the 55th Artillery, U.S. Army Coast Artillery Corps, originally organized as a heavy artillery unit .

== Lineage ==
Constituted 1917 and organized CD Boston 12-1-17 as 55th Arty, CAC, by redesignation of 152nd Co, CAC;, 96th Co, CAC; 11th Co, MANG, CAC; 83rd Co, CAC; 4th Co, MANG; 9th Co, RING; 3rd Co MANG; and 5th Co, MANG. In addition, many individual transfers were made from the 1st, 2nd, 6th, & 9th Cos, MANG, and 13th Co, RING. The 55th Arty departed New York for Europe 3–25–18. After additional training, the 55th Arty was assigned to the 31st Bde, CAC, in August 1918 and served in France until the Armistice. The 55th Arty departed Brest, arriving New York 1-22-19 and moved to Camp Mills, NY, until 1–26–19, when it moved to CD Long Island Sound. 1st Bn was stationed at Fort H.G. Wright, 2nd & 3rd Bns at Fort Terry. There most of the regiment's NG and National Army personnel were discharged.

On 1-29-19 the 55th Arty CAC was transferred with 31st Bde to Fort Winfield Scott, arriving 2-23-19 with 9 officers and 170 EM. The 31st Bde was then transferred to Fort Lewis, WA, arriving 10–4–19, and its strength was gradually built up to near peacetime levels.

In April 1921, the 55th Arty was assigned to Hawaii. The 31st Bde was broken up and personnel from the 57th Arty were reassigned to the 55th Arty and to the 59th Arty slated for the Philippines. This enabled the 55th to activate HHD&CTs of the 1st, 2nd, and 3rd Bns, as well as to moderately reinforce the firing batteries. In addition, Service Btry was activated. The 55th Arty arrived in Honolulu 5-12-21 and was posted to Fort Kamehameha. The regiment was soon reorganized. The three battalions were restructured with three batteries each by reassigning personnel from three companies manning fixed seacoast armament. This resulted in the activation of Btrys G, H, & I and the relocation of 1st Bn to Fort Shafter and 2nd Bn to Fort Ruger. On 6–1–22, each component of the 55th Arty received an additional serially numbered company designation.

These additional designations were dropped on 7–1–24, when the regiment was redesignated 55th CA (TD) (Tractor Drawn) Regt. Personnel shortages resulted in a 10-31-25 reorganization; the 3rd Bn was inactivated at Ft. Shafter, its personnel reassigned to 1st Bn, replacing personnel transferred to the 64th CA (AA) Regt. The reorganized 1st Bn, 55th CA, moved to Ft. Kamehameha and Service Btry combined with HHB. At this time Btry C, 55th CA, transferred to the 64th CA (AA) Regt as Btry I. A new Btry C was constituted and activated in the 55th CA.

In the mid-1930s, 2nd Bn HHB moved to Fort DeRussy although its firing batteries remained at Fort Ruger. On 2–17–41, AA detachments were organized in Btrys E & F to man fixed 3-inch AA guns at Ft. Ruger and Sand Is.

On 12–7–41, the 55th CA was posted around Oahu: Btrys A, B, & C on Oahu's southwest coast between Pearl Harbor and Kaena Point, Btrys D & E on the northeast coast, and Btry F on Sand Is. On 12–27–41, Btry D moved from Ft. Ruger to the Island of Kauai, where it established Camp Kauai. When filler personnel arrived from the mainland at the end of June 1942, two officers and 69 enlisted men from Battery C, 55th CA, with a pair of 155 mm GPF mobile seacoast guns was deployed to Canton Island in January 1942 where they later also manned four 4-inch navy guns. Battery D was reinforced to its authorized wartime strength.

Detachments from Btry A formed Btry 80-X in December 1941; a second detachment helped form the 804th CA (HD) Btry (Sep). Btry F at Sand Is. was designated the 807th CA (HD) Btry (Sep), while a second detachment helped organize the 715th CA (HD) Btry (Sep) 10–21–42. During World War II, various changes were made in the makeup of the 55th CA. The 55th CA (155 mm Gun) Regt was reorganized and HHB reconstituted and activated; 1st, 2nd, and 3rd Bn HHBs were activated at Ft. Ruger 5–22–43. Btry G (SL) was activated at Ft. Kamehameha. The 1st Bn HHB and Btrys A, B, & C, and 2nd Bn HHB were stationed at Ft. Kamehameha, Btry D on Kauai, Btry E at Wilridge. A detachment from Btry F was at Sand Is. The 811th CA (HD) Btry (Sep) was activated 8–1–42, at Hilo, HI, with personnel from Btry B.

In September 1943 Btry E manned Btry Willy's 155 mm guns on Wiliwilinui Ridge near Btry Wilridge, an 8-inch naval turret battery. Btry F was posted at Camp Punchbowl, a 155 mm position overlooking Honolulu. Both batteries were released from Hawaiian Seacoast Artillery Command 9-30-43 and moved to Ewa, Oahu, staging for deployment to the Gilbert Islands in the Central Pacific as components of army defense battalions providing garrison forces. Btry E went to Tarawa and Btry F to Apamama in 5-31-44 when the 55th CA Regt was inactivated. HHB 3rd Bn at Ft. Ruger was inactivated 5-31-44 and its personnel reassigned to HHB 179th CA (155 mm Gun) Bn, which shortly thereafter moved to Kahuku, in HD Kaneohe Bay and North Shore. Personnel of Btry E reassigned to Btry A and personnel of Btry F reassigned to Btry B, 179th CA Bn. Both Btrys A & B, 179th CA Bn, returned to Oahu soon thereafter. The 55th CA was disbanded 6–14–44.

In the late 1950s and early 1960s, the regiment included:

- Battalion; Station; Activated; Inactivated
- 1/55 New York Defense Area Sept. 1958 26 July 1960
- 2/55 Hartford Defense Area Sept. 1958 24 December 1964
- 3/55 Detroit Defense Area Sept. 1958 23 December 1960
- 4/55 Thule Air Base (Greenland) 1 Sept. 1958 20 December 1965

== Distinctive unit insignia ==
- Description

A gold color metal and enamel device 13/16 inch (2.1 cm) in width consisting of a red triangle in outline point up with gold center. In base the Arabic numerals 55 in red, on the tops of the numerals a caterpillar in red and above the caterpillar the symbol used on the French battle maps to indicate the position of 155mm guns in black (a disc with an arrow with doubled barbs issuant). On the base line of the triangle the motto "VIGILANTIA" in gold letters.

- Symbolism

The 55th Artillery Regiment was organized in 1918 from both regular and National Guard Coast Artillery Companies. One of the companies was from the "Old First" Regiment of Massachusetts whose motto was Vigilantia. The Regiment saw heavy service during World War I and was armed with 155mm guns and caterpillar which are represented in the design. The motto translates to "Vigilance".

- Background

The distinctive unit insignia was originally approved for the 55th Artillery Regiment on 13 April 1922. It was amended to change the description on 7 December 1923. It was redesignated for the 55th Field Artillery Battalion on 25 June 1952. The insignia was redesignated for the 55th Artillery Regiment on 17 December 1958. It was redesignated for the 55th Air Defense Artillery Regiment on 14 January 1972.

The regiment is reactivated in February, 21 2025.

== Coat of arms ==
=== Blazon ===
- Shield

Gules, on a pile wavy Or, a pine tree eradicated Azure, in base two fire arrows point up of the second inflamed Proper.

- Crest

On a wreath Or and Gules an isosceles triangle of the first, bordure of the second bearing between a pellet from which issues an arrow with doubled barbs palewise Sable and the Arabic numerals "55" Gules, a caterpillar fesswise of the last, all conjoined. Motto VIGILANTIA (Vigilance).

=== Symbolism ===
- Shield

Red and yellow are the colors of the Artillery branch. The wavy pile alludes to the unit's origin as Coast Artillery and further suggests service across two oceans, noting that the 55th Artillery campaigned in both the European and the Pacific theaters. The fire arrow, a highly effective artillery weapon of pre-gunpowder days is an allusion to the firepower of present-day artillery; the two of them representing participation in both World Wars. The blue pine tree denotes award of the Distinguished Unit Citation for the Ardennes Campaign of World War II.

- Crest

The 55th Artillery Regiment was organized in 1918 from both regular and National Guard Coast Artillery Companies. One of the companies was from the "Old First" Regiment of Massachusetts whose motto was Vigilantia. The Regiment saw heavy service during World War I and was armed with 155mm guns and caterpillar which are represented in the design.

=== Background ===
The coat of arms was originally approved for the 55th Artillery Regiment on 8 March 1922 and consisted only of the badge (DUI) as the crest of the coat of arms. It was redesignated for the 55th Field Artillery Battalion on 25 June 1952. It was redesignated for the 55th Artillery Regiment on 17 December 1958. The coat of arms was amended to add a shield on 8 July 1965. It was redesignated for the 55th Air Defense Artillery Regiment on 14 January 1972.
