= Fort Winthrop =

Fort in Massachusetts, United States

- Governors Island, Boston Harbor, Massachusetts
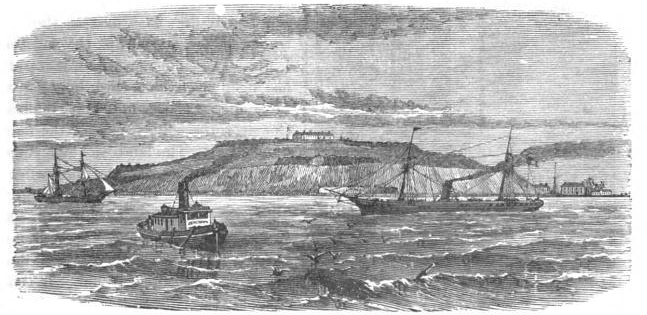
- Late 19th-century engraving showing a view of the fort from Boston Harbor

Site information
- Type: Coastal Defense
- Owner: Logan Airport
- Condition: no remains

Location
- Location in Massachusetts
- Coordinates: 42°21′07″N 71°00′43″W

Site history
- Built: 1808-1812
- Built by: Lt. Colonel Sylvanus Thayer, US Army Corps of Engineers
- In use: 1812-1905
- Demolished: 1905
- Battles/wars: War of 1812; American Civil War

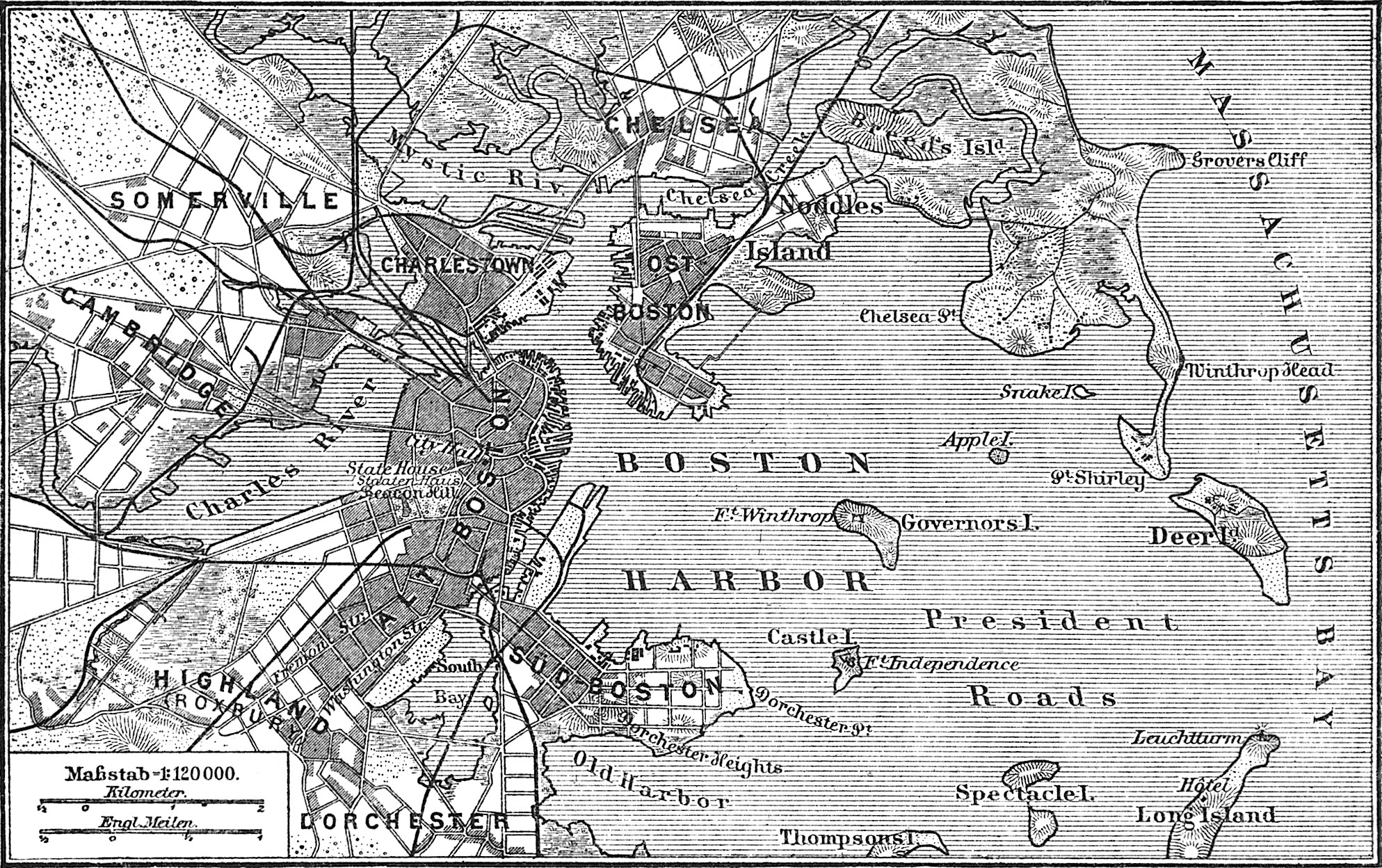
1890 map of Boston Harbor showing Governors Island before the airport was built.

Fort Winthrop, built in 1808 and named Fort Warren until 1834, was a defensive fortification in Boston Harbor named after John Winthrop, an early governor of the Massachusetts Bay Colony.

== History ==
The fort was built on Governors Island, which was named Conant's Island until it was granted to Winthrop in 1632. His family owned the island until 1808, when the United States acquired land in the center of the island for the construction of a fort under the Second System of US fortifications. Between 1808 and 1812 the government built an earthen fort on that land, in the form of an eight-pointed star. Sylvanus Thayer, later famous as Superintendent of West Point, was in charge of the fort's construction. Secretary of War Henry Dearborn's report on fortifications for December 1811 described it as "...a star fort of masonry, mounting twelve guns...and brick barracks for 40 men...On the West head, a circular battery of ten guns mounted [and] on the South point, a circular battery, calculated for ten guns...".

The fort was initially named Fort Warren, after Revolutionary War hero Dr. Joseph Warren, but in 1834 the name was transferred to the new Fort Warren on George's Island.

In 1846 the government acquired the remainder of the island, and construction soon began on a stone fort under the Third System of fortifications. This included a 3-story citadel with numerous musket loopholes and 16 guns in a rooftop battery atop the center of the star fort, and rebuilding of the previous West Head and South-east batteries with seven guns each. Sylvanus Thayer returned to supervise the early years of the citadel's construction, followed by Joseph K. F. Mansfield.

During the Civil War masonry forts (notably Fort Pulaski in Georgia) had not fared well against rifled artillery, and it was determined that new batteries of earthworks were needed. In the 1870s improvements were begun on the fort as part of a large-scale program, including rebuilding the South Battery with 18 guns, a new East Battery of seven guns, and a Mortar Battery of six mortars. Some 15-inch Rodman guns were included in the upgrade. Work was halted on these in 1875 and the fort was in caretaker status with only an Ordnance Sergeant for maintenance until the Spanish–American War in 1898. Following a magazine explosion in 1902, the fort was abandoned in 1905.

Governors Island, which was separated from other harbor islands and the mainland by extensive mudflats, was joined to the mainland in 1946, as part of the expansion of Logan International Airport. Stonework from Fort Winthrop was used to build the foundation of Storrow Drive in Boston.

== See also ==
- Seacoast defense in the United States
- List of military installations in Massachusetts
