= Depression range finder =

Gun fire control device

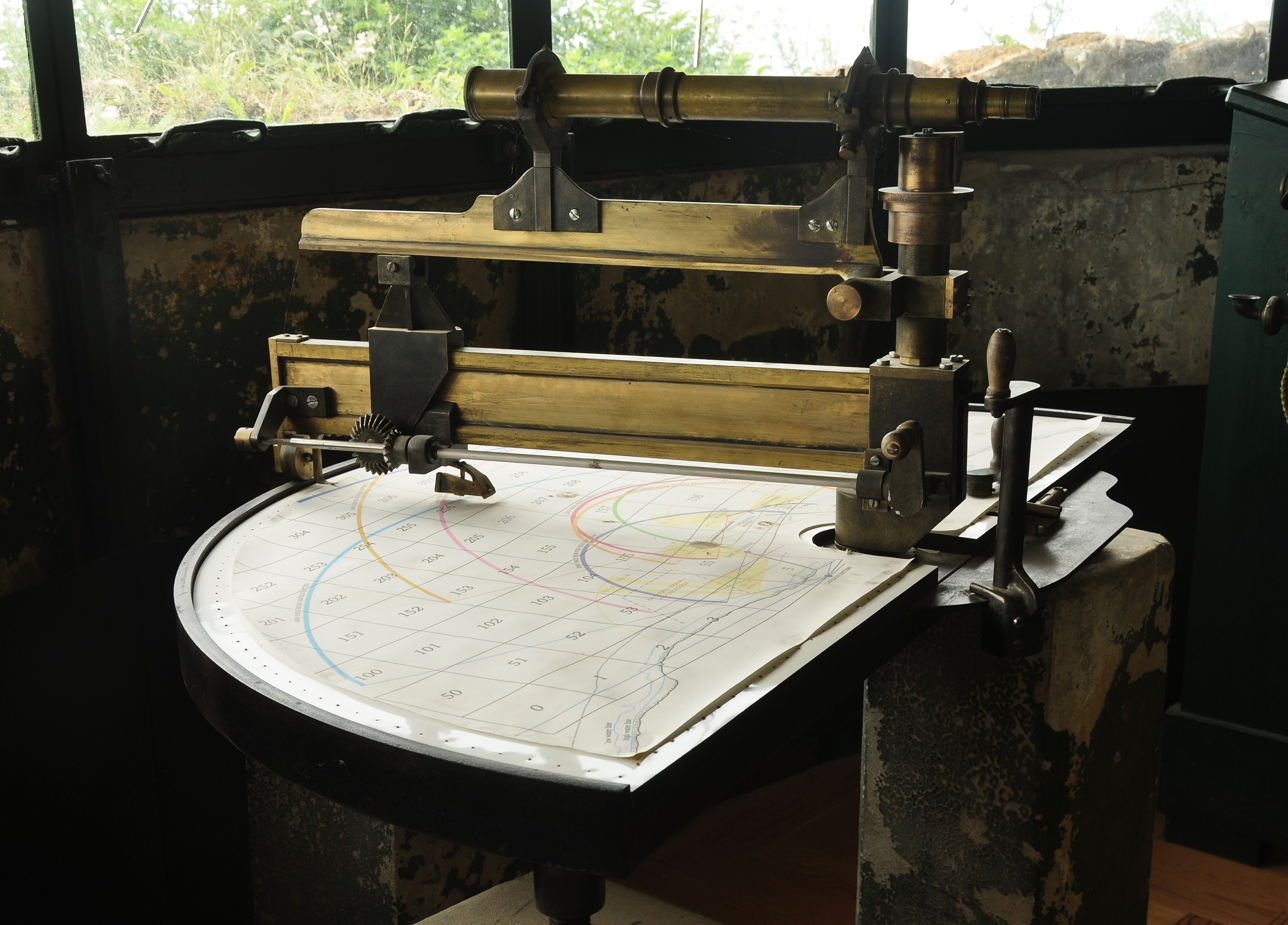
A Watkin depression position finder on a range dial in a position finding cell, Dover Castle, England

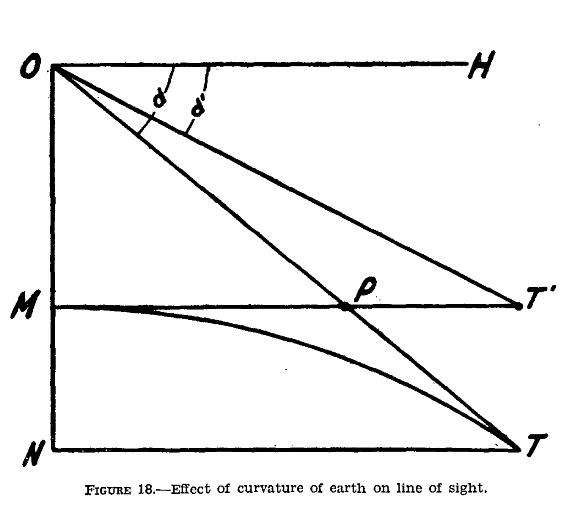
O represents the observer, at a distance OM above sea level (and the target on the sea). The range to the target is determined by taking the cotangent of the depression angle d times the height of the instrument OM, to yield the range MP. But due to the curvature of the Earth, the true range is MT. To achieve this, the DPF instrument adjusts the observer's height from OM to ON, and then correctly measures the range as NT. Alternatively, the depression angle could be adjusted to d, but this method was not used.

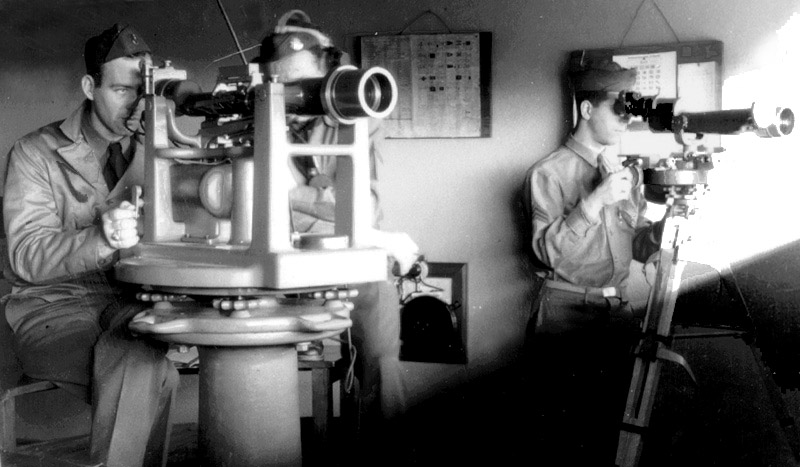
An American DPF (left) and azimuth scope (right) in use

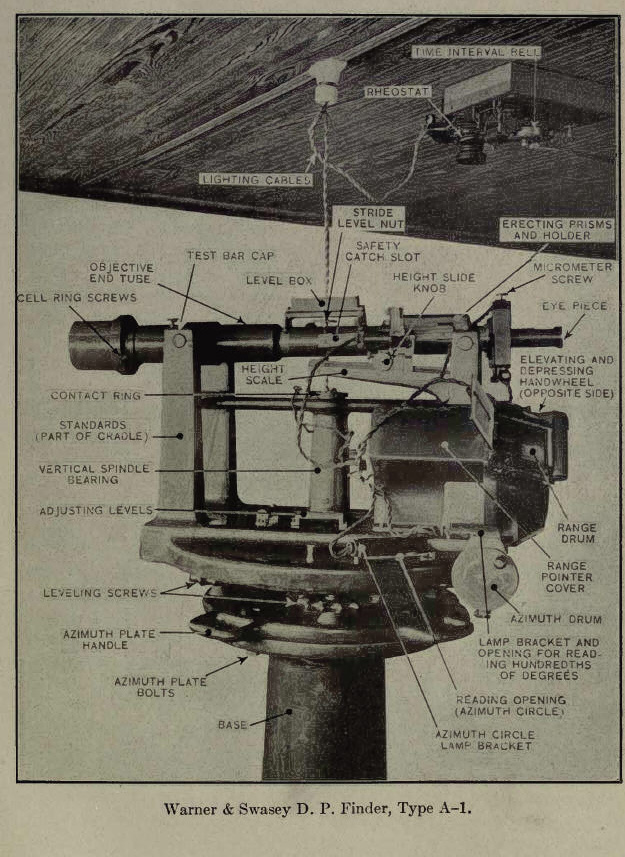
An American Warner-Swasey DPF, illustration from a 1910 manual

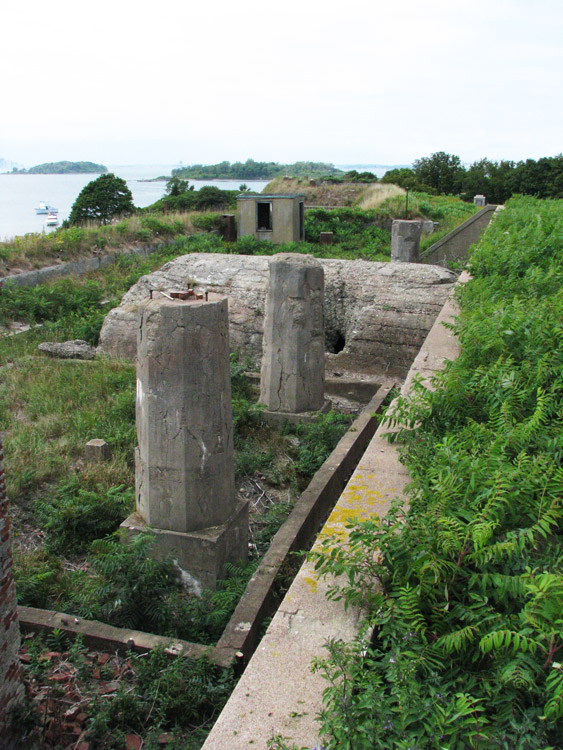
The remains of three American base end stations with their concrete DPF mounting columns. These columns date to about 1910.

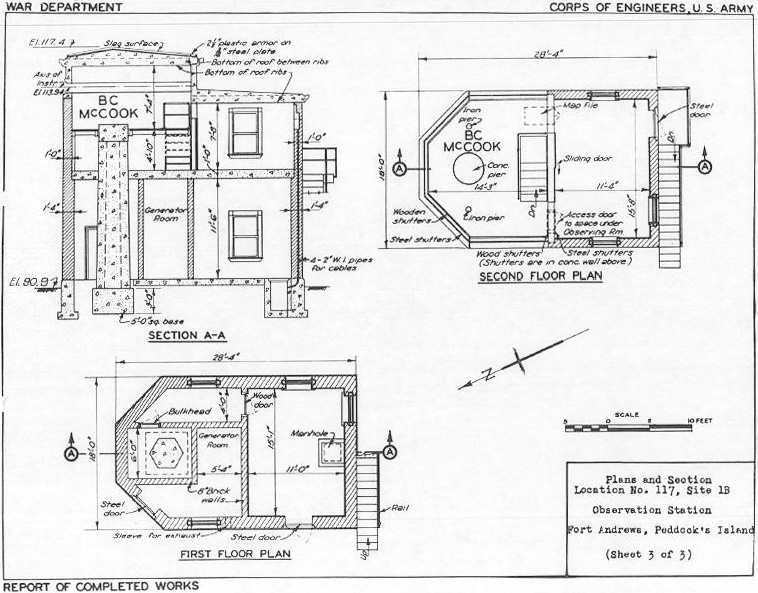
A section drawing of an American fire control building with a DPF mounting column roughly 19 ft tall.

The depression range finder (DRF) was a fire control device used to determine the target's position by observing range and bearing and to calculate firing solutions when gun laying in coastal artillery. It was the main component of a vertical base rangefinding system. It was necessitated by the introduction of rifled artillery from the mid-19th century onwards, which had much greater ranges than the old smoothbore weapons and were consequently more difficult to aim accurately. The DRF was invented by Captain H.S.S. Watkin of the Royal Artillery in the 1870s and was adopted in 1881. It could provide both range and bearing information on a target. The device's inventor also developed a family of similar devices, among them the position finder, which used two telescopes as a horizontal base rangefinding system, around the same time; some of these were called electric position finders. Some position finders retained a depression range finding capability; some of these were called depression position finders. Watkin's family of devices were deployed in position finding cells, a type of fire control tower, often in configurations that allowed both horizontal base and vertical base rangefinding. Watkin's system included automatic electrical updating of range and bearing dials near the guns as the position finders were manipulated, and a system of remotely firing the guns electrically from the position finding cell. The improved system was trialled in 1885 and widely deployed in the 1890s. Functionally equivalent devices were developed for the United States Army Coast Artillery Corps and its predecessors, called depression position finders or azimuth instruments depending on function (vertical base or horizontal base), adopted in 1896 and deployed widely beginning in the early 1900s as the Endicott program of modern coastal defences was built. These devices were also used by both countries to control submarine (underwater) minefields.

== Operation ==
A depression position finder measured the range to a distant target (such as a ship) by solving a right triangle in which the short side was the height of the instrument above mean low water; one angle was the constant right angle between the short side and the plane of the ocean, and the second angle was the depression angle from the horizontal of the instrument as it sighted down from a fire control tower or a base end station at the target. This was called the "vertical base" system of rangefinding. These calculations were built into the scales and gearing of the instrument as configured for its site, which also corrected for the curvature of the Earth and for optical parallax, so the horizontal range to the target could be read from a dial on the DPF.

== British system ==
Initially, a simple method of fire control was adopted in which an officer in an observation position would observe where shots landed and relay the information back to the gunner. It was hampered by the need for ranges to be estimated by eye, which introduced significant inaccuracy. Between 1870 and 1880, various mechanical range-finding devices were developed to provide a more accurate system, a type of horizontal base system. They were, however, limited by requiring two observers to be positioned on a piece of flat ground up to 400 metres (1,300 ft) wide, using instruments to measure the two base angles of a triangle between the observers and the target.

A serving British Army officer, Captain H.S.S. Watkin of the Royal Artillery, devised a solution based on surveying principles, exploiting the fact that the observer's height above the waterline could be used as the base of the measuring triangle. A measurement of the angle of depression to the bow-waterline of the target would thus give the range. While stationed at Gibraltar in the 1870s, he developed a device termed the Watkin Depression Range-finder (DRF), derived from the surveyor's level, which could be used in permanently fixed mountings whose height above sea level could be precisely determined. It was trialled by the War Office between 1876 and June 1881, when it was formally adopted, and subsequently became standard equipment in coastal forts and batteries. It was easy to use, highly accurate and was combined with automatic electrical updating of range and bearing dials near the guns as the position finders were manipulated.

Soon after the DRF was developed, Watkin developed the Position Finder (PF), a family of several devices which, when two were used in a horizontal base system, gave a more accurate range than the DRF. Some of these were called electric position finders. In some configurations, both horizontal base and vertical base ranging became possible. A horizontal PF, called a transmitter, would be combined with a DPF, called a receiver, in widely separated position finding cells. The DPF mounting was functionally similar to a plotting board and called a "range dial"; it electrically updated the range and bearing dials near the guns as the DPF was manipulated. The improved system was trialled at Fort Bovisand in 1885 and the Breakwater Fort in 1887, both at the entrance to Plymouth Sound. At some point remote electrical firing of the guns was added. The PF was used with heavier guns (9.2-inch (234 mm)) and the DRF with lighter guns (6-inch (152 mm)).

== American system ==
A depression position finder (DPF) was an observation instrument that was used in the fire control system of the U.S. Army Coast Artillery Corps and predecessors from circa 1901 through 1945 to locate targets in range and/or azimuth as part of the process of directing the fire of a battery of coast defence guns or mortars. It was one of many technologies introduced to US coast defences as part of the wide-ranging Endicott program. These instruments, which contained telescopes on massive, finely geared mountings, were located in various types of fire control towers (or smaller facilities) such as base end stations, DPF bunkers, or built into concrete gun emplacements. The American DPFs were functionally similar to the British device of the same name, but their data were usually relayed by telephone to a plotting room instead of directly to the guns. To measure range correctly, a DPF instrument had to be configured for the specific site at which it was emplaced, and had to be adjusted during the day for the level of the tide at that site. The US Army adopted a DPF in 1896, around the time the first gun and mortar batteries of the Endicott program were completed. At this time US coast defences were designed for short-range use, including controlled underwater minefields. In 1899 a 60-foot DPF tower was built for trials at Fort Hancock, New Jersey. In 1901 a board recommended that DPFs should be augmented by a horizontal system, though the chief of artillery noted that DPFs could extend coverage at the edges of horizontal systems.

One soldier looked through the telescope (a 12- or 20-power instrument) and "waterlined" the target ship, putting a vertical cross hair on the ship's forward stack and a horizontal cross hair on the ship's waterline. By turning a geared crank, he attempted to hold the ship in his sights as it passed through his field of view. A second soldier read azimuth and range data from the instrument at designated intervals. These intervals (usually set at 20 or 30 seconds) were indicated by the ringing of a time-interval bell or buzzer. This information was then called in by telephone to a fire control center or plotting room for the gun battery that had been selected to fire upon the designated target (often directly below a base-end station or DPF bunker), the plotting board in that facility was updated, and the guns notified to aim and fire.

The DPF instrument was meant to be used to locate targets at ranges of between 1,500 and 12,000 yards. Its effective range depended upon its height above mean low water, (Note: The DPF was considered to give accurate ranges for a distance equal to 1,000 yards for each 10 feet of its height above mean low water.) the viewing conditions (lighting, weather, fog, or smoke) and upon the skill of its operators in holding a "sight" on a target. From about 1900 to 1925, DPF instruments were often mounted for stability on massive, octagonal concrete columns perhaps two feet across and buried deeply in the ground. A wooden or lath-and-plaster fire control tower or base end station was then built up around, but not connected to, the column.

The DPF could be used as part of a vertical base system of triangulation to compute the range to the target. It could also be used as part of a horizontal base system, in which it served as one of two base end stations, both of which measured an observing angle to the target, with the range and azimuth of the target being calculated from their joint observations.

During the early part of the 20th century, DPF instruments were often installed in the battery commanders' stations for coastal artillery batteries and were used by the battery commander or a member of his staff to yield firing data (range and azimuth) for the guns. DPFs were usually mounted on concrete columns that extended from the foundation of their stations; this minimised the effect of structure aging or minor battle damage on the instrument's position. As longer-range guns were emplaced beginning in the 1920s, horizontal base end stations, often miles apart, became the preferred method of fire control. Coincidence range finders, self-contained short-baseline horizontal systems, began to supplement the DPF due to being quick and easy to use. The DPF system was generally much less accurate than the horizontal base system, and by World War II the advent of radar made the DPF a back-up system that was used only in emergencies (such as damage to other observation stations). However, in the bombardment of Fort Stevens by a Japanese submarine on 21 June 1942, the only time a coastal defence installation in the contiguous United States was attacked, the fort's commander used a DPF to determine that the submarine was out of range, and thus did not return fire.

== See also ==
- Rangefinder
- Seacoast defense in the United States
