= Coast Artillery fire control system =

American military term

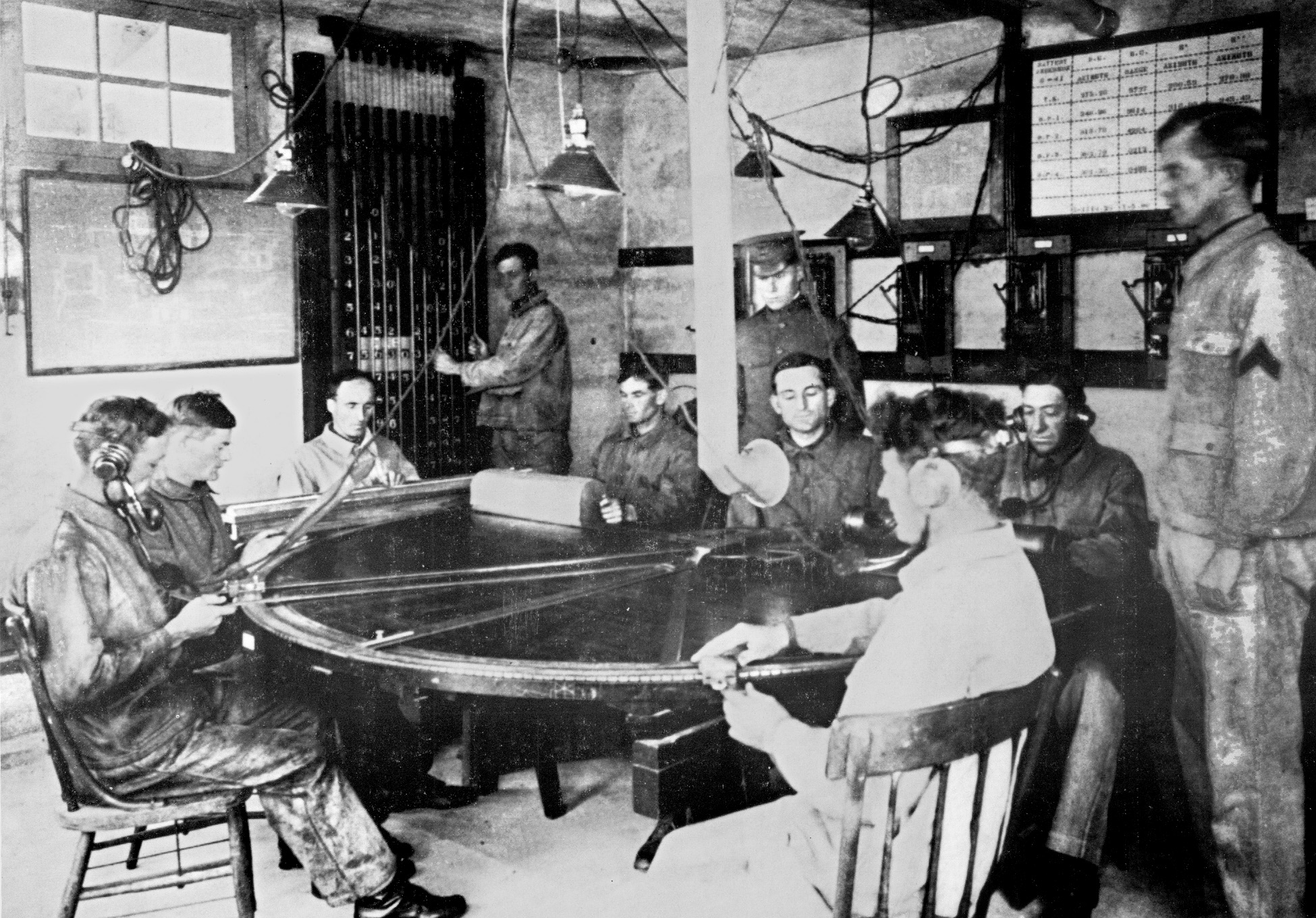
In this plotting room, the table is a Whistler-Hearn plotting board. A range correction board is on the left rear of the table.

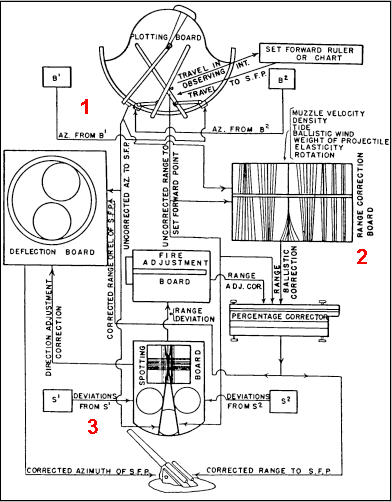
A conceptual diagram of the flow of fire control data in the Coast Artillery (in 1940). The set forward point of the target was generated by using the plotting board (1). This position was then corrected for factors affecting range and azimuth (2). Finally, fire was adjusted for observations of the actual fall of the shells (3), and new firing data were sent to the guns.

In the U.S. Army Coast Artillery Corps, (Note: The U.S. Army Coast Artillery Corps was created in 1907, separated from the Field Artillery Corps as part of the U.S. Army artillery. It was abolished in 1950. Over the 35 years of its most active period (about 1905 to 1940), the coast artillery system in the United States involved over 2,000 guns and mortars of 3-inch caliber or greater, defending some 30 locations (generally harbors) across the country. Designed to protect major U.S. harbors against attack from the sea, the coast artillery system in the continental United States never actually fired upon an enemy target. By 1942, with the course of WW2 turning in the Allies' favor, the Coast Artillery was scaled back, and was dissolved altogether in 1946.) the term fire control system was used to refer to the personnel, facilities, technology and procedures that were used to observe designated targets, estimate their positions, calculate firing data for guns directed to hit those targets, and assess the effectiveness of such fire, making corrections where necessary.

== Fire control instruments ==
The Coast Artillery's early fire control instruments supported optical rangefinding and position finding, either horizontal base or vertical base, with both systems usually present for each fort. Early horizontal base rangefinding required two azimuth (a.k.a. bearing or deflection) instruments, preferably widely separated, and a communications system to transmit data to a plotting room and then to the guns. The instruments were often in bunkers called base end stations, as they defined the endpoints of a baseline. A base end station might be a two-story structure with a plotting room or other instruments or facilities on the lower level. By the 1920s coincidence range finders, self-contained horizontal base instruments, were in use along with the other methods. Though these could be used quickly, these had baselines of only a few feet, reducing their accuracy and maximum effective range.

Vertical base rangefinding used a single depression position finder (DPF) mounted as high as possible above the water level; these were derived from similar British devices and adopted beginning in 1896. Along with the target's azimuth, they measured the vertical angle from the instrument to the target; with the instrument's height above water known, this determined the target's range. The need to be progressively higher above water as gun ranges increased was a severely limiting factor for the DPF, and they were usually supplemented by horizontal base systems. As gun ranges continued to increase, in the 1920s additional horizontal and vertical base systems were installed, in tall fire control towers at some locations, including the Harbor Defenses of Portsmouth (New Hampshire) and the Harbor Defenses of the Delaware.

By World War II, radar had become a better method of determining a target's position. However, in the bombardment of Fort Stevens by a Japanese submarine on 21 June 1942, the only time a coastal defense installation in the contiguous United States was attacked, the fort's commander used a DPF to determine that the submarine was out of range, and thus did not return fire.

== Plotting rooms ==
Plotting rooms were used by the Coast Artillery Corps to house a team of soldiers who were engaged in controlling fire for the guns of a coastal artillery battery. Plotting rooms were in use from about 1895 through the end of WWII, at which point the U.S. Coast Artillery was disbanded. In some newer Coast Artillery batteries during World War II, these rooms were called Plotting, Switchboard, and Radio (PSR) rooms, and were often (but not always) integrated with the bunkers at the battery that were also used for ammunition storage, electrical generators, and other support functions. For 16-inch guns, the PSR bunker was some distance from the gun battery bunker, to avoid the shock of firing interfering with the plotting room equipment.

A plotting room was connected by telephone lines (and sometimes by radio) to base end stations that observed the locations of enemy ships and sent data to plotting room soldiers who used equipment such as plotting boards to calculate where the guns should be pointed and when they should be fired. Telephone lines also ran from the plotting room to the guns and were used to relay firing data. Other devices, like "range correction boards" or "deflection boards", were used in the plotting room to calculate corrected firing data (described below) or to adjust range and azimuth after spotters in remote observing stations observed where prior shots had fallen.

Plotting rooms were sometimes made of concrete and buried below ground (for protection) or were located in the reinforced concrete casemates of coast artillery batteries. Plotting rooms were also located in free-standing structures, either low towers or one- or two-story wood and plaster buildings, which might house facilities for several batteries near each other in barracks-like structures. These multiple-battery installations might also have sleeping quarters and latrine facilities nearby. Sometimes plotting rooms were located hundreds of yards from the batteries they controlled. They often sat on top of nearby hills or ridge lines.

Gun data computers were electro-mechanical computers were introduced into the Coast Artillery in the 1940s, particularly in the new 100- and 200-series 16-inch and 6-inch gun batteries that became operational during that period. Some of these computers received data directly from communicators that were connected to observation instruments in fire control stations or from Coast Artillery radar equipment.

== Basic fire control procedure ==
In brief, the fire control system in use from about 1900 through WW2 involved observers, often situated in base end stations or other fire control towers, using optical instruments (like azimuth telescopes or depression position finders) to measure bearings and/or ranges to targets (usually moving ships). (Note: During WW2, the M8 gun data computer emerged. This trailer-mounted electro-mechanical computer required the same observations as the earlier system. But now telephone operators linked to the observers entered position data to the computer by turning hand wheels, instead of shouting them out to operators on the plotting board. Triangulation, correction of firing data, and relocation to particular guns was handled by the computer, much more quickly and accurately than by the older, manual methods.) Both horizontal and vertical base rangefinding systems were used. These observations were communicated to personnel in battery plotting rooms, who used a mechanical device called a plotting board to indicate the target's observed location on a map of the area. The red "1" on the diagram at right indicates this first stage of the fire control process.

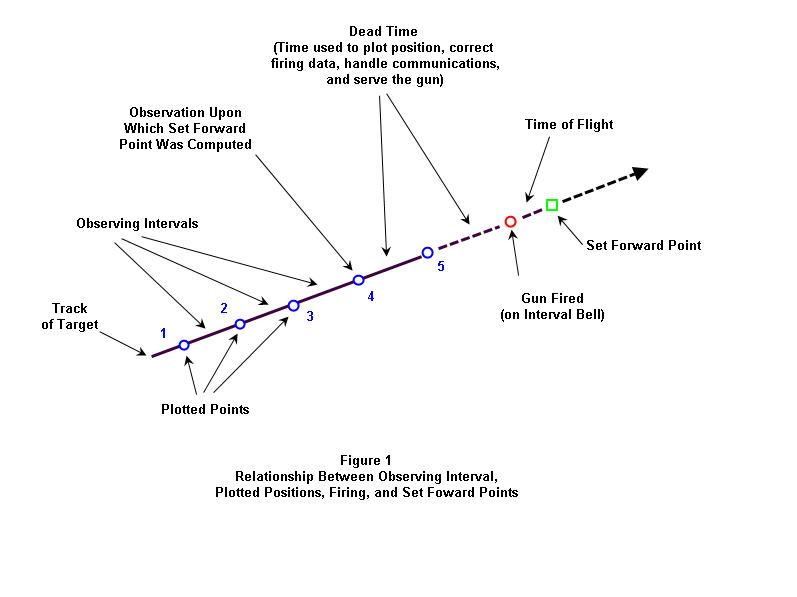
A series of observed positions (blue circles) establishes the likely track of the target. Using a plotting board, the set forward point is determined, based upon the target's observed course and speed and an assumption about when the gun is to be fired.

Once several positions had been plotted for the target (blue circles on Figure 1 at left), plotting board operators estimated the position of the target at the instant a salvo, fired by the battery, was expected to land. This position was called the "set forward point" (green square in Figure 1), since it involved "setting forward" the target's expected position (assuming continued forward travel at the same speed and in the same direction) during two intervals of time: (1) the "dead time" between the time the observation had been made and the time the guns were actually fired at that target plus (2) the "time of flight"--the time the projectile spent in the air before hitting the target. The set forward point was expressed in terms of firing data: a range (in yards) and an azimuth (a compass heading in degrees) (Note: In the U.S. Coast Artillery, azimuths were expressed as bearings clockwise from true South as opposed to true North.) at which the gun(s) should be pointed by the gun crews in order to hit the target.

Before these firing data were sent to the guns, however, they were corrected for a variety of "non-standard conditions", like temperature (which affected the explosive power of the powder charge) or wind strength and direction (which affected the flight of the projectile). The red "2" in the diagram at right indicates this stage in the fire control process. Special devices, like the "deflection board" (for corrections in azimuth) or the "range correction board" (for corrections in range) were used to produce corrected firing data (described below). (Note: Coast Artillery manuals and publications between 1910 and 1940 describe many different instruments, devices, scales and schedules that were proposed and adopted for correcting (before firing) and adjusting (after firing) firing data. Many pieces of fire control equipment had to be made specific to just one type of gun and/or for each different type of ammunition.)

The final stage (the red "3" in the diagram at right) had to do with using feedback from the battery's observers, who spotted the fall of the projectiles (over or under range, left or right in azimuth, or on target) and telephoned their data to the plotting room so that the aim of the guns could be corrected for future salvos. (Note: Prior to about 1920, little use seems to have been made of spotting data, the guns being fired on the basis of direct sighting from the gun commander's position or plotting board calculations, corrected for non-standard conditions. The argument was made that adjusting these data for the fall of fire simply slowed down gun-laying and introduced a new source of error into the system.)

== Fire control timing ==
This example shows the relationship of steps in the fire control process playing out over time.

Fire control in the Coast Artillery involved a sequence of steps that was carried out over and over again while a target was being tracked and fired upon. First, observers sighted on the target and sent their observations to the plotting room. Next, plotters calculated the target's position and probable future movement, as well as adjustments to range and azimuth (direction). Then firing data were sent to the batteries and used by gun crews to point their guns. The guns were fired. Finally, spotters might spot the fall of the projectiles, sending this information back to the plotting room for use in correcting fire. After this, observers would sight on the (new) position of the target, beginning another cycle. The time period between sequential sightings by the observers was called the "observing interval". It was typically set at 20 seconds for controlling batteries of guns larger than 3-inch caliber.

Not only did everyone in the fire control system have to stay in synch (for example, knowing which one of a series of sets of fire control data they were working with at any given time) but certain functions (notably the making of target sightings by the observers and the firing of the guns by the gun crews) had to be carried out at precise intervals if the accuracy of the system was to be maintained.

To enable all battery personnel to stay in synch, a "time interval bell" (or buzzer) would be rung in every observation or spotting station serving the battery, in the plotting room, and at each gun, using bells or buzzers wired together with a centrally located master clock. (Note: In WW2, the time interval "bell" could also be a tone injected over a telephone line.) Five seconds before the start of the next cycle, the bell would ring. After a one-second delay, it would ring again. And after another one-second gap the bell would ring a third time, and on this third ring the observations were made again and/or the guns were fired.

A well-trained battery could observe, plot, adjust, and transmit the firing data to its guns, which could then be loaded and laid, all before the next 20-second bell, at which point the guns would be fired. (Note: The example in Figure 1 above assumes that a longer time is needed to lay and fire the guns, so the set forward point is computed based upon Observation #4 and firing does not occur until the end of observing interval #6. Establishing a longer firing interval or "skipping" an interval as above for a given battery was often done if battery personnel were not skillful enough to fire on the shorter interval.) If for some reason the firing data were not received in time by the guns, or if a hold-up or a misfire occurred, then firing happened at the end of the following interval. In such a case, the command "Relay!" (re-lay) was given at the guns. (Note: Sometimes interim firing data would be sent to the guns between the primary intervals, enabling gunners to set up their guns more quickly or fire additional salvos at important targets.)

== Corrected firing data ==
Corrected firing data was a term used in the Coast Artillery Corps for fire control purposes circa 1890–1945. It refers to firing data (range and azimuth (a.k.a. bearing or deflection) to the target) that had been corrected for various "non-standard conditions". In Coast Artillery parlance, the term "correction" usually referred to changes in estimated range or deflection (direction) that were made prior to firing. The term "adjustment" usually referred to changes that were made after a shot had been fired and were used to modify the aim of the gun(s) for the next shot. Adjustments were usually made by observing and plotting the fall (splashes) of the shells fired and reporting by how much they were left or right in azimuth or over or under in range.

=== Factors influencing corrections ===
Corrections could be made for the following factors:

1. Variations in muzzle velocity (including the results of variations in temperature of powder)
2. Variations in atmospheric density
3. Variations in atmospheric temperature
4. Height of site (taking account of the level of the tide)
5. Variations in weight of projectile
6. Travel of the target during the time of the projectile's flight
7. Wind
8. Rotation of the earth (for long range guns)
9. Drift (Note: Drift refers to "the divergence of the projectile from the plane of departure due to its rotation, its ballistic character, and the resistance of air. It is generally in the direction of rotation....")

The uncorrected firing data, to which such corrections were applied, were those derived, for instance, from using a plotting board to track the position of an observed target (e.g., a ship) and the range and azimuth to that target from the guns of a battery.

=== Implementing corrections ===
==== Meteorological data ====
Several of the common corrections depended on meteorological data. For this reason, each Coast Artillery fort or fire command maintained its own meteorological station which transmitted an hourly meteorological message to the entire command whenever firing was anticipated. This message included a series of five- and seven-digit data blocks that reported on the temperature at a given altitude, followed by the wind speed, direction, and ballistic density of the air at each of 11 different altitude bands, running from the surface up through 30,000 feet (9,100 m). The higher altitude readings were needed for firings of the 12-inch (305 mm) coast defense mortars, which sent their shells on very high trajectories.

Once data were available on wind speed and direction, a circular slide rule-like device called a "wind component indicator" (see image below) was used to figure out the components of the wind that affected either the range or the deflection (in azimuth) of the shells fired. This device yielded index numbers that were either fed to the plotting room and used to correct readings on a plotting board, were used as input to a "deflection board" (see below) or were telephoned to the batteries and used by gun crews to make offsets directly on the range wheels or sights of the guns themselves.

==== Using the Range Correction and Deflection Boards ====
The range correction board is pictured below. This was a tabletop device that resembled a 1940s-vintage wide-carriage mechanical adding machine, without the operating arm on the side. It was used to figure out the individual corrections that might be required for factors #1 through #7 above and to cumulate these. The result from the range correction board was fed to a slide rule-like device called a "percentage corrector" to obtain the corrections (if any) to be sent to the gun/s. The range correction board made use of a paper chart that was rolled onto its working surface and offered non-standard curves from which corrections could be read off. This chart had to be specific to the combination of gun, power charge, and projectile in use at the time. Values for the individual factors (#1 through #7 above) had to be obtained by plotting room personnel from battery officers or from the hourly meteorological message. Since precise measurements of muzzle velocity (factor #1) often could not be made, estimates were used, based upon the size of the powder charge being fired and the characteristics of the individual gun being used.

Also pictured below is the "deflection board", used to correct for any of the factors #6 through #9 above. The Model 1905 board is shown in the two images below. (Note: This board looked much like the Whistler-Hearn plotting board, which in fact it was designed to complement.) This device had a movable T-square and also a movable brass frame (or platen), both of which could be slid back and forth independently across three scales that ran across its base. The protractor-like portion of the platen carried a "multiplying scale", which was sometimes used if the battery had missed the chance to fire at the proper interval and was forced to wait until the next interval. Also affixed to the base of the board was a truncated arc (the "wind arc and scale"), at the left side of the board, which was used to set up the board for the wind speed and direction reported in the meteorological message (see above).

Proper alignment and rotation of the inter-related scales and arms enabled corrections to be read off the three different scales that ran horizontally across the bottom of the board (the travel scale, the deflection scale, and the azimuth correction scale). Even then, however, the use of the device was complicated, since it yielded reference numbers that had to be fed back to the operators of the plotting board before being fed to the guns.

Like many other pieces of Coast Artillery fire control equipment, the deflection board was a mechanical analog computer that used methods of similar triangles to solve the problems of correcting fire for wind speed and direction, drift of the projectile, and angular travel of the target during the observing interval.

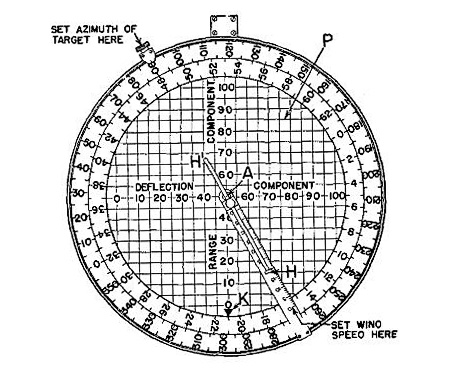
A wind component indicator used to translate data on wind speed and direction into range and deflection (azimuth) corrections for Coast Artillery guns.

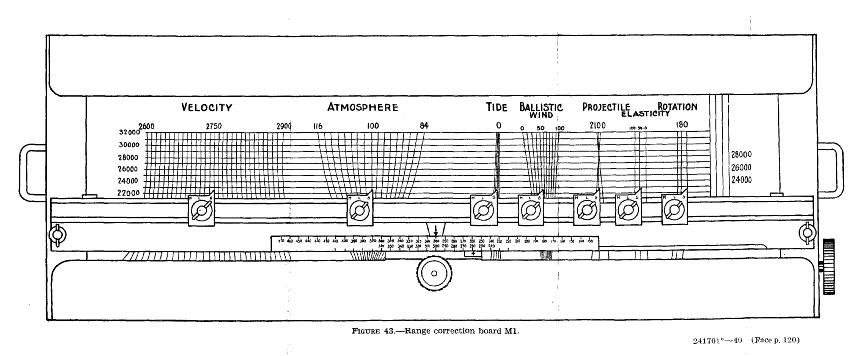
Rendering of the face of a range correction board, a mechanical, analog device that sat on a tabletop and cumulated corrections in range for firing Coast Artillery guns.

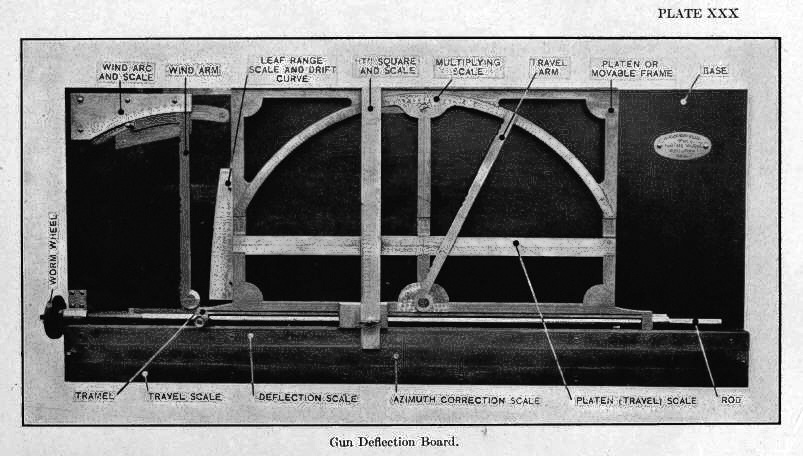
A deflection board M1905 is shown in this 1910 photo, which labels many of its components.

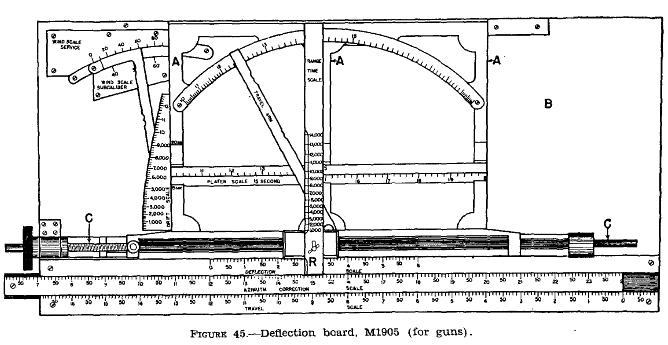
This 1940 drawing of the deflection board M1905 clearly shows some of the scales used on the board.

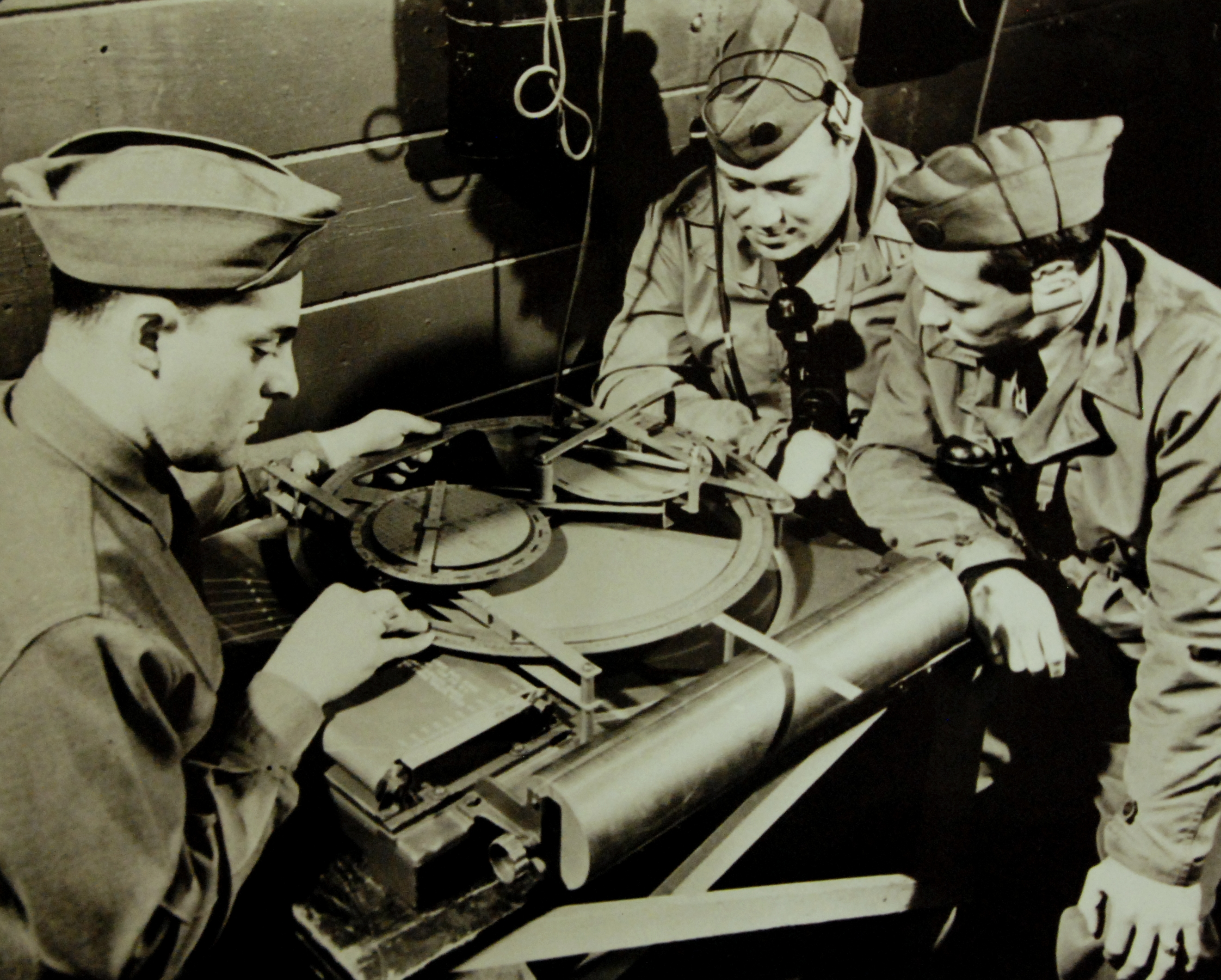
A deflection board being used by Coast Artillery officers in late 1941 or early 1942

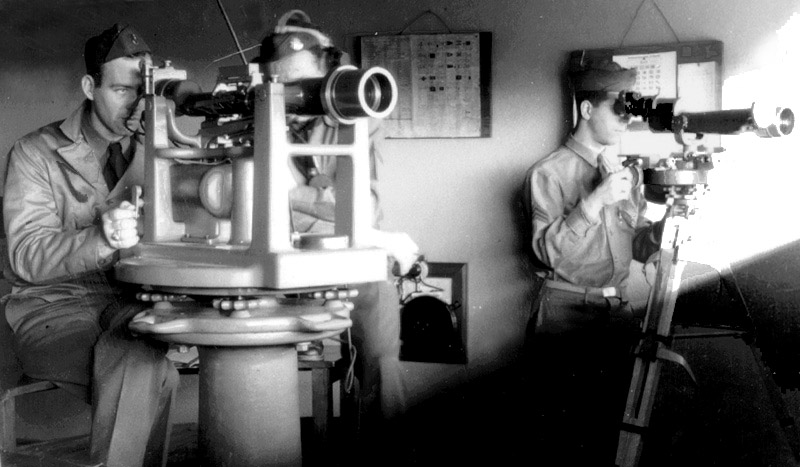
A depression position finder (left) and azimuth scope (right) in use

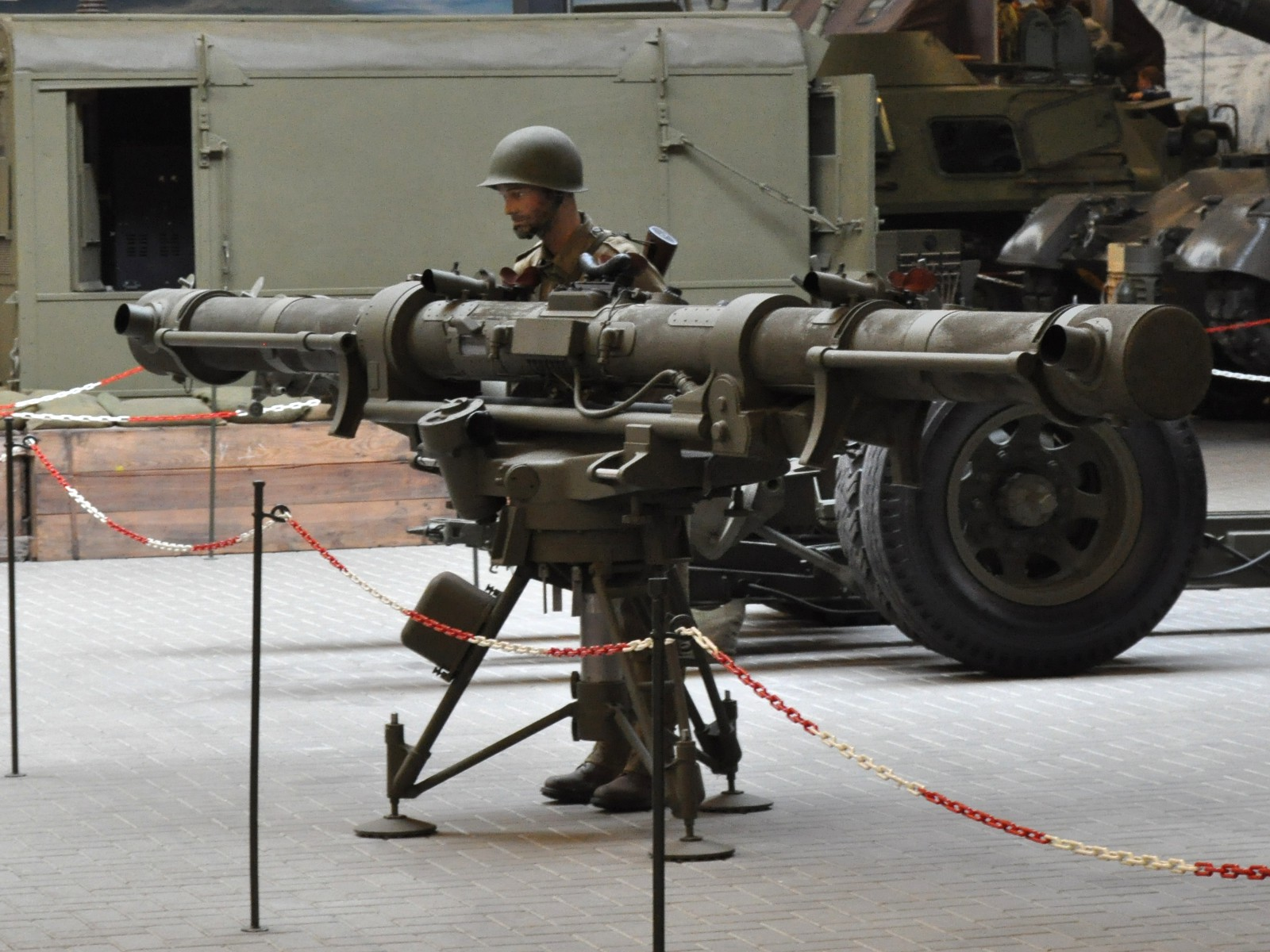
Coincidence rangefinder (CRF) at a military museum in Overloon, Netherlands, generally resembling US coast artillery CRFs

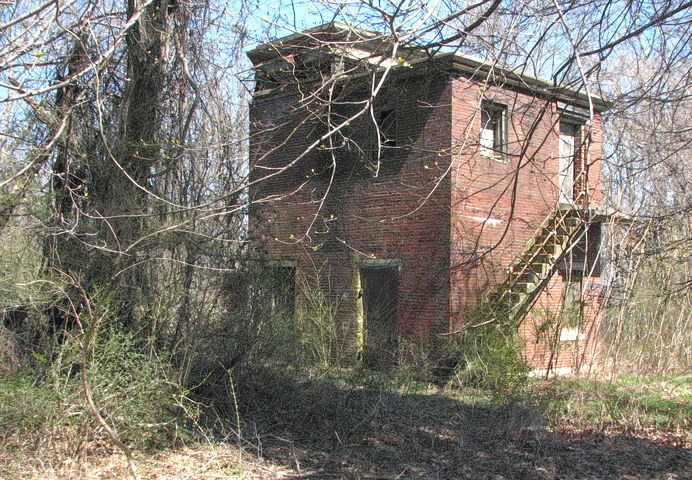
1904 fire control station, east side of Fort Andrews, Massachusetts

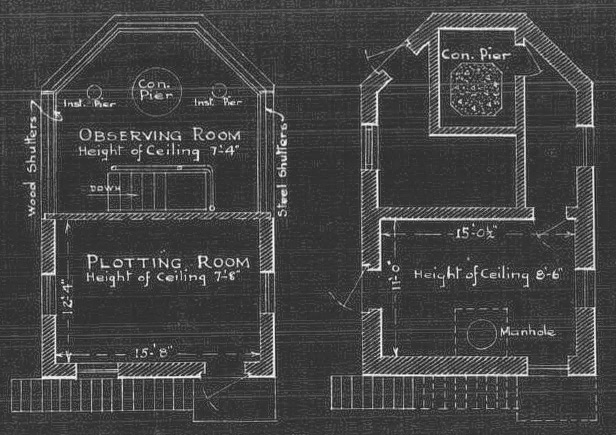
Plan of fire control station, east side of Fort Andrews, Massachusetts

This massive concrete casemate housed the underground plotting room for the 12-inch mortars of Battery Whitman at Fort Andrews in Boston Harbor.

== See also ==
- Fire-control system
- Seacoast defense in the United States
- Harbor Defense Command
- List of U.S. Army fire control and sighting material by supply catalog designation
