= Plotting room =

Coastal Defence Room

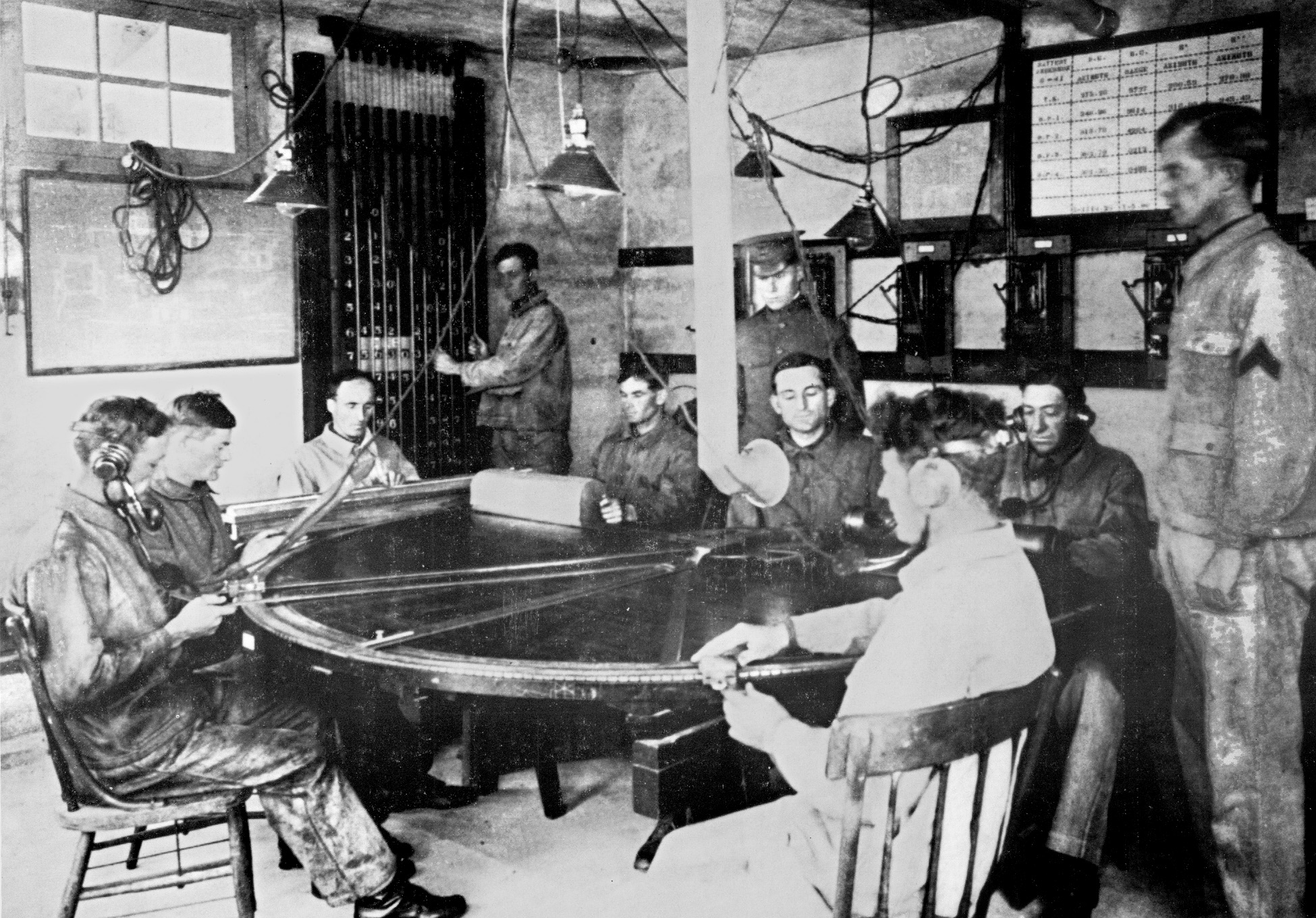
In this U.S. Army Coast Artillery Corps plotting room, the table is a Whistler-Hearn plotting board. Other devices for fire control are visible on the table.

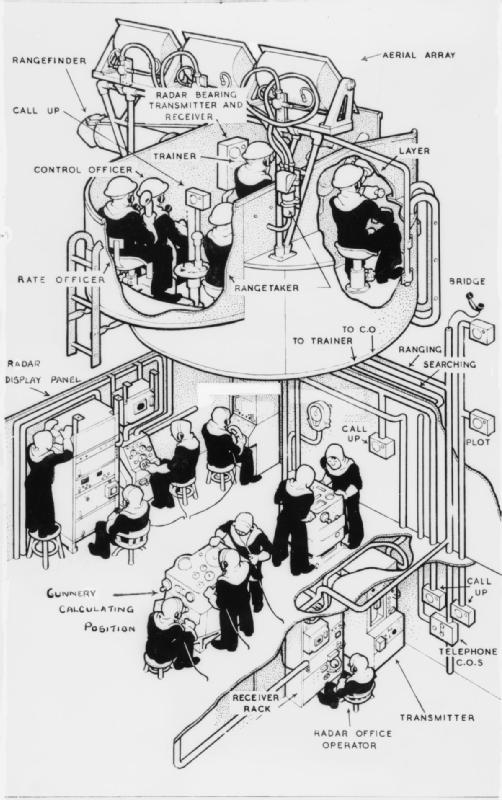
Cut-away view of a Royal Navy World War II K-class destroyer Director Control Tower (D.C.T.) with Type 285 radar; plotting room shown on lower level

This massive concrete casemate housed the underground plotting room for the 12-inch mortars of Battery Whitman at Fort Andrews in Boston Harbor.

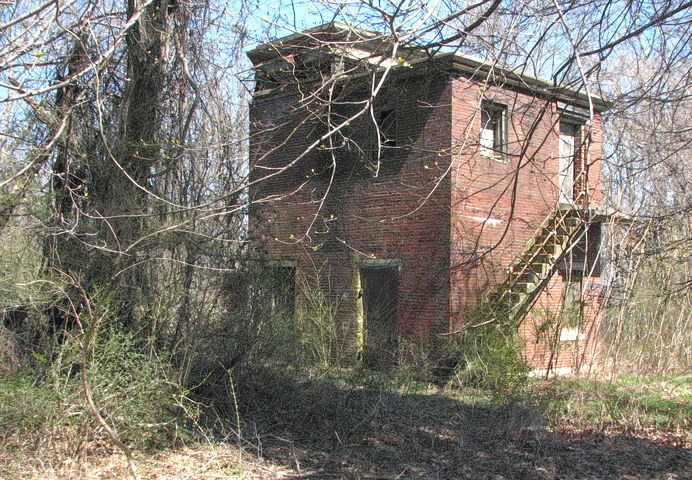
1904 fire control station, east side of Fort Andrews, Massachusetts

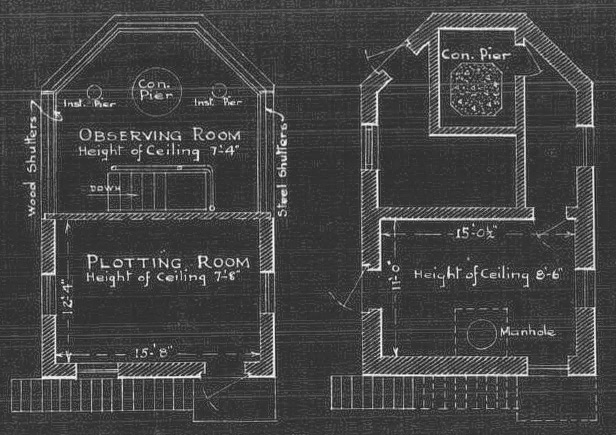
Plan of fire control station, east side of Fort Andrews, Massachusetts

A plotting room was the co-ordination centre of a fire control system for guns used against enemy ships or aircraft, whether naval guns or coastal artillery. The plotting room received data on ship or aircraft position and motion from fire control instruments or their operators and determined and transmitted the range and bearing (a.k.a. azimuth or deflection) the guns would fire on. Plotting rooms came into use in the early 1900s for coastal artillery and during World War I for warships as gun ranges increased, and were in general use through the 1970s on World War II-era ships (and into the 1990s on the US Navy's Iowa-class battleships). Warships had plotting rooms for naval fire control for guns from 5-inch to 18-inch calibre, including anti-aircraft use for the smaller guns. On armoured ships such as battleships and cruisers, plotting rooms were located in the armoured citadel, protected by both deck and belt armour. With a few exceptions (mostly in Scandinavia), coastal defence gun installations were inactivated shortly after World War II (US) through the middle 1950s (UK). Equipment in plotting rooms included specialised plotting boards and other analogue devices; by World War II these were supplemented or replaced by electro-mechanical gun data computers. Data could be received and transmitted by telephone, or directly via dedicated electrical systems. Locations of plotting rooms in coastal defence installations varied greatly; they could be in low-rise structures such as base end stations (usually colocated with observation equipment in a two-story structure), taller fire control towers, in gun battery structures, or in bunkers separate from gun batteries.

== Britain ==
The British Watkin position finder system for coastal artillery, which entered service in the 1890s, did not require a plotting room due to mounting a depression position finder (DPF) on a "range dial", similar to a plotting board. An electrical system moved bearing and range dials near the guns as the DPF was manipulated by an operator.

To direct the artillery covering the English Channel near Dover, in 1941 a protected, underground plotting room was built at Fan Bay, Kent (51°08′10.8″N 1°21′37.55″E). Information concerning the range, speed and direction of enemy shipping was received from radar stations and observation posts, and from this target directions were calculated and relayed to the batteries.

== See also ==
- Coast Artillery fire control system
- Seacoast defense in the United States
