= Base end station =

American coastal artillery station

Base end stations were used by the United States Army Coast Artillery Corps as part of fire control systems for locating the positions of attacking ships and controlling the firing of seacoast guns, mortars, or mines to defend against them. A British equivalent was the position finding cell.

== Types of base end stations ==
A "true" base end station was one of a pair of stations at either end of a precisely measured (surveyed) baseline. (Note: This describes a horizontal base system. Vertical base systems, contained within a single instrument (and a single observation station), were also used.) Once simultaneous bearings from each base end station to a target were taken, since the distance between the stations (the baseline) was known, the range to the target from either station could be calculated through triangulation. If the target's bearing from each station was sent to a plotting room and input to a plotting board, the position of the target could be estimated and firing coordinates for a gun battery could be calculated.

Some base end stations were located in tall fire control towers (FCTs) (Note: These towers could contain as many as 10 or more stories and rise 100 feet or more above the ground. Extra height greatly increased the range at which they could spot targets and the accuracy of their range estimates.) Sometimes, the terms "base end station" and "fire control tower" were used interchangeably. In general, however, a fire control tower (FCT) was a structure built to raise one or more base end, spotting, or observation stations high above ground level. Some fire control towers contained several base end stations, one on top of another on different stories of the tower, with each station being at one end of a different baseline and being assigned primarily to a different gun battery in a harbor's defensive scheme. Other base end stations resembled pillboxes or small bunkers dug into the ground or on the surface overlooking coastal waters. Still others were camouflaged to resemble seaside homes or cottages. Some base end stations had anti-aircraft observation positions on their top levels, or harbor observation radar antennas on platforms above their roofs.

=== Typical equipment ===
Almost all base end stations were equipped at least with an azimuth telescope (similar to a surveyor's theodolite) to enable them to sight accurate bearings to a target. In addition, some base end stations held a depression position finder (DPF) or a coincidence range finder (CRF) that could be used by itself (without reference to another station) to produce fire control data for the gun(s). Sometimes a space holding one of these instruments (if not located on a baseline and paired with a second station) was referred to simply as an observation station.

These stations were used between the 1890s and 1946. At the end of the war almost all of them were declared surplus and were sold off to public and private owners. More than 100 of these stations still survive today on the coasts of the United States, as part of state preserves or under private ownership, although many have been razed to clear sites for new development.

== Horizontal Base Systems ==
In a horizontal base system (like that in the diagram above), two base end stations were located at precisely surveyed points, (Note: The position of the station was usually measured (surveyed) as the "pintle center" or mounting point of its primary observation instrument.) one at each end of a base line, or a line between them of known length and azimuth. (Note: In this case, azimuth is synonymous with "direction" or "compass bearing." In the United States Army Coast Artillery Corps, azimuths were measured from south (instead of north) in a clockwise direction.) At each of these stations was an observation instrument (such as an azimuth telescope or a depression position finder (DPF) capable of making a precise measurement of the bearing of a distant target (usually a ship) from the station. When the stations at each end of the baseline had made their measurements, they communicated these to a plotting room (or fire control center) which used an analog tracking device called a plotting board to locate the position of the target. (Note: Once this position was noted, it had to be converted to a set forward point, or the position the target was estimated to have reached at the time the shells fired would actually hit it. A number of other corrections also had to be made before the guns were pointed (in angle and azimuth). Corrected firing data included corrections for height of tide, wind direction and strength, atmospheric pressure, temperature, type of projectile fired, type and amount of powder used, etc.) Later in World War II, the target bearings could be input to an electro-mechanical gun data computer, which calculated the position of the target and the required adjustments for things like ballistic factors and the locations of the guns that were to be fired.

Making this system work properly required the two base end stations to take bearings on the target at precisely the same time. To enable this, a bell or buzzer (called the time-interval bell) was rung automatically at fixed intervals (usually every 15 or 20 seconds) in all observing stations across a harbor defense system (Note: This bell also rang in the plotting room and at each gun in the battery. The cycle of bells governed the speed with which the plotting room crew had to work. If a gun did not receive "fresh" firing data by the end of a timing cycle, it had to wait until new data were received during a later timing cycle. For a fuller explanation, see the article on plotting boards.) (note the dashed communications lines in the diagram above). One soldier, using the telescope or DPF, would track the target. At the sound of the bell, a second soldier would read the azimuth (at which the instrument was pointed) off a scale on the instrument and telephone this reading to the plotting room.

== Spotting Stations ==
In World War II, each base end station was often combined with a spotting station. This meant that a second spotting instrument (usually an azimuth telescope) on a separate pedestal (or tripod) was included in the observing room, alongside the primary one (which was usually a depression position finder [DPF]).

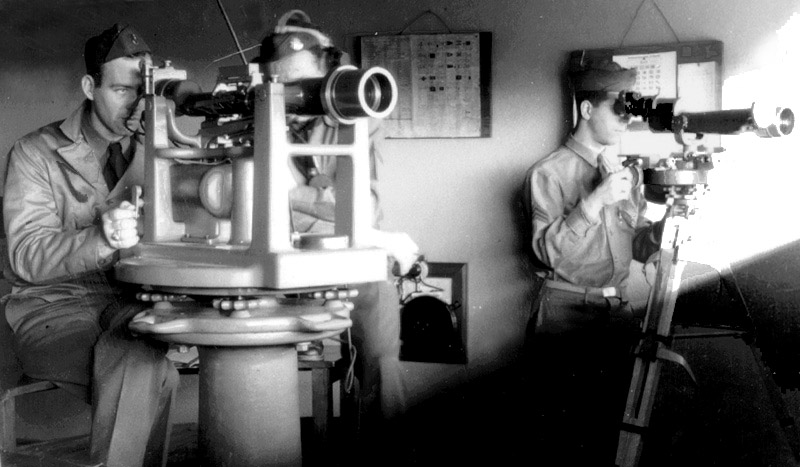
A Depression Position Finder (on the left) and an Azimuth Scope at Fort Standish MA

While the primary observer (and perhaps the azimuth reader who assisted him) tracked the target, the role of the spotter was to observe the fall of fire from the guns of the supported battery, telephoning back to the plotting room whether the shells were falling short or over, left or right.

In harbor defense plans and other documents, such as survey data sheets prepared by the United States Coast and Geodetic Survey (USC&GS) and maintained by its successors, these combined stations were often labeled according to the tactical numbers (Note: These numbers were assigned by the given harbor's Harbor Defense Command as part of its overall defense plan. Sometimes these numbers changed from year to year, for example if a formerly numbered gun was later not actually installed in its emplacement.) of the gun batteries they were designed primarily to serve and their number in the series of stations serving that battery. Thus a station marked B 4/2 S 4/2 referred to base end station #4 for battery #2 and spotting station #4 for battery #2.

== Vertical Base and Self-Contained Systems ==
These systems used instruments such as the depression position finder (DPF) or the coincidence rangefinder (CRF) to measure the range and/or azimuth to the target. (Note: Although the Coast Artillery used the "vertical base" and "self-contained" categories separately in its guidance, both types of systems were in fact self-contained, since either one could use a single observing instrument in a single observing station to accomplish its purpose.)

Either of these two types of range finding stations could function effectively by itself, measuring both range and bearing (azimuth) to the target, without the need for a second base end station (as with the horizontal base system). Using one of these position-finding systems, while not as accurate as using the horizontal base method, had certain advantages. (Note: Most notably, the effectiveness of a horizontal base system depended on having both the widely separated stations watching (and taking bearings on) the same target, or ship. Under battle conditions, with a large group of attacking ships moving rapidly past the observing stations, perhaps under cover of a smokescreen or bad weather conditions, it might be difficult for the two stations to pick out the same target. Vertical base or self contained systems did not have this problem, although they did suffer from other drawbacks. The instruments used in these systems required better trained operators, were usually accurate to shorter ranges, and were more easily thrown off by fog or the "boiling" atmosphere caused by waves of heat rising up across the observed field.)

== Some examples ==
Base end stations (also called observation stations) took a variety of forms. Some were multi-story fire control (FC) towers, either square or round in plan (or both), and rising from 20 to 100 feet above the ground. Some looked like forest fire watch towers. Others appeared to be small buildings, or were disguised as seaside cottages to camouflage their purpose. Still other base end stations resembled small pillboxes, dug into the ground, and usually positioned to look down on the channels they defended.

Base end stations were often assigned to particular batteries of guns or mine fields in a harbor defense system. In some U.S. harbors during WW2 there were 20 or more of these base end stations, often from 10,000 to 15,000 yards apart, and tied together by telephone lines running through switchboards. These stations could be used flexibly in different combinations or by different gun batteries as ships moved through the area, or in case a given station was damaged by enemy action.

=== Fire Control Towers (FCTs) ===
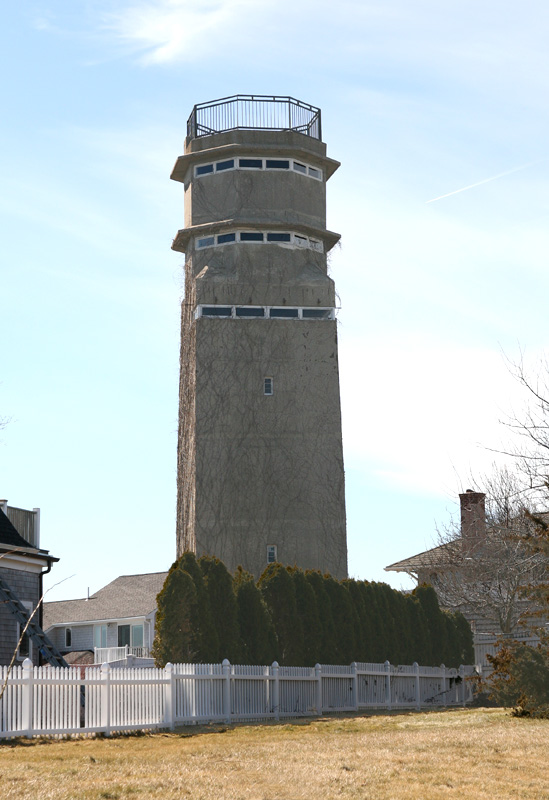
7-Story FCT at Point Allerton MA

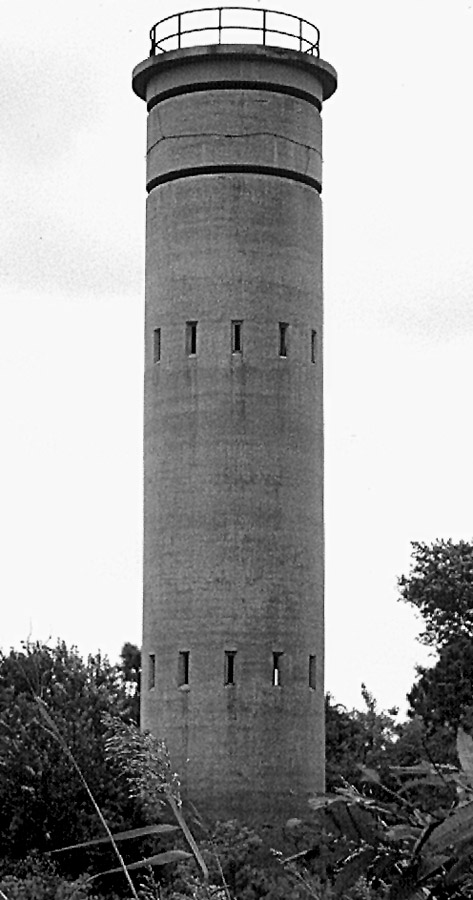
Ft. Miles Round FCT

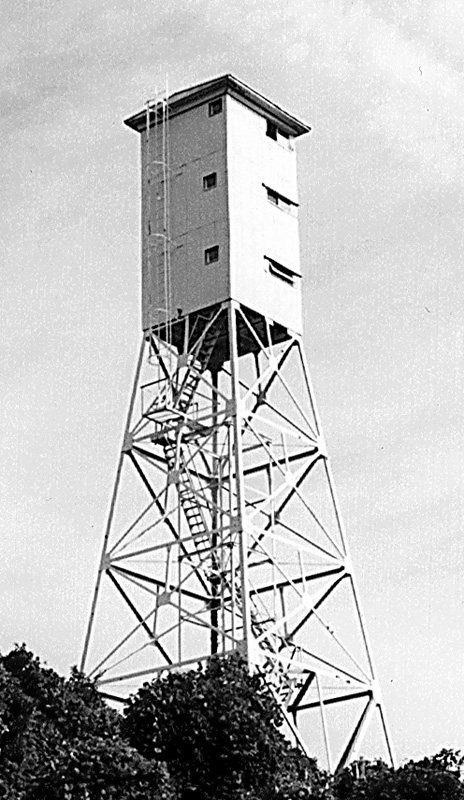
Steel FCT, Ft. Story, VA

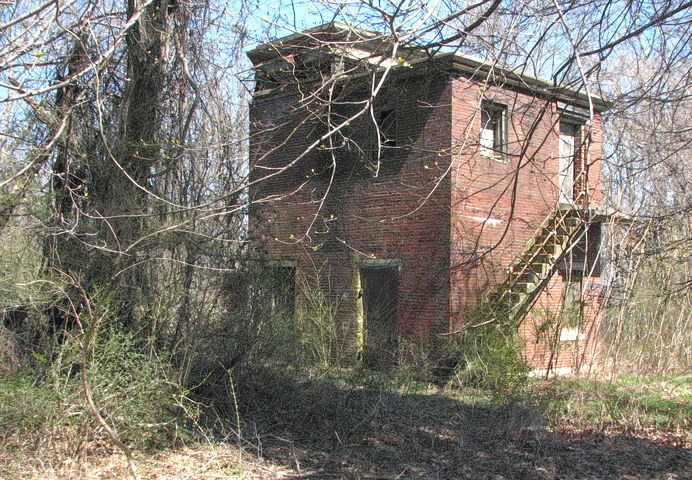
Rear view of brick 2-story FCT from 1904 at Fort Andrews in Boston Harbor.

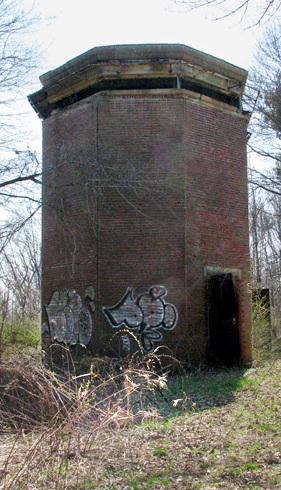
Front view of brick FCT at Ft. Andrews.

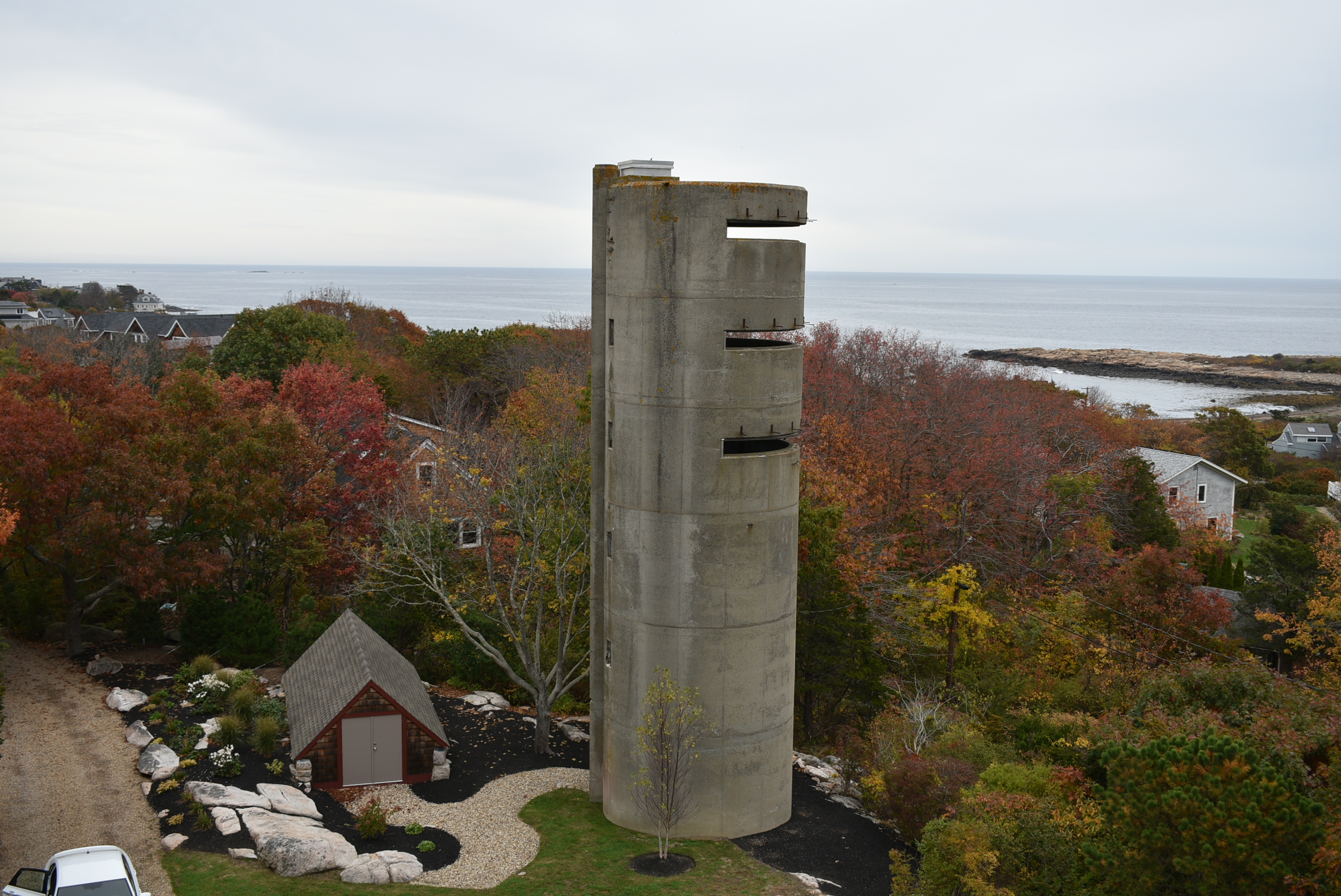
Emerson Point FCT 8-Story FCTs Nahant MA

=== Base End Stations (Lower Elevation) ===
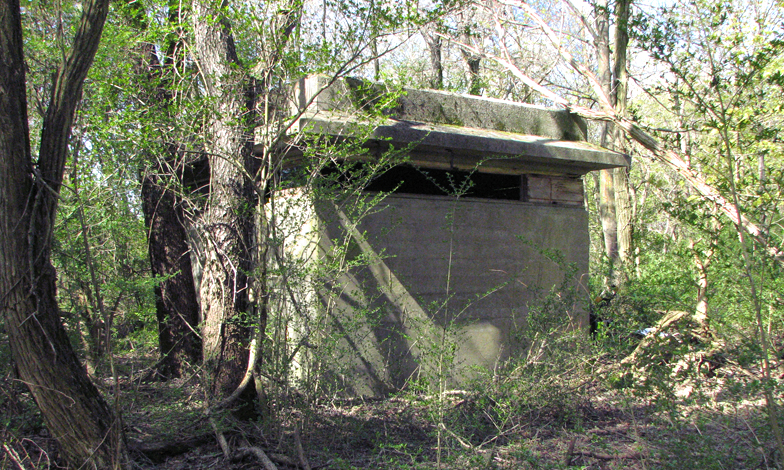
Low base end station, Ft. Andrews west ridge.

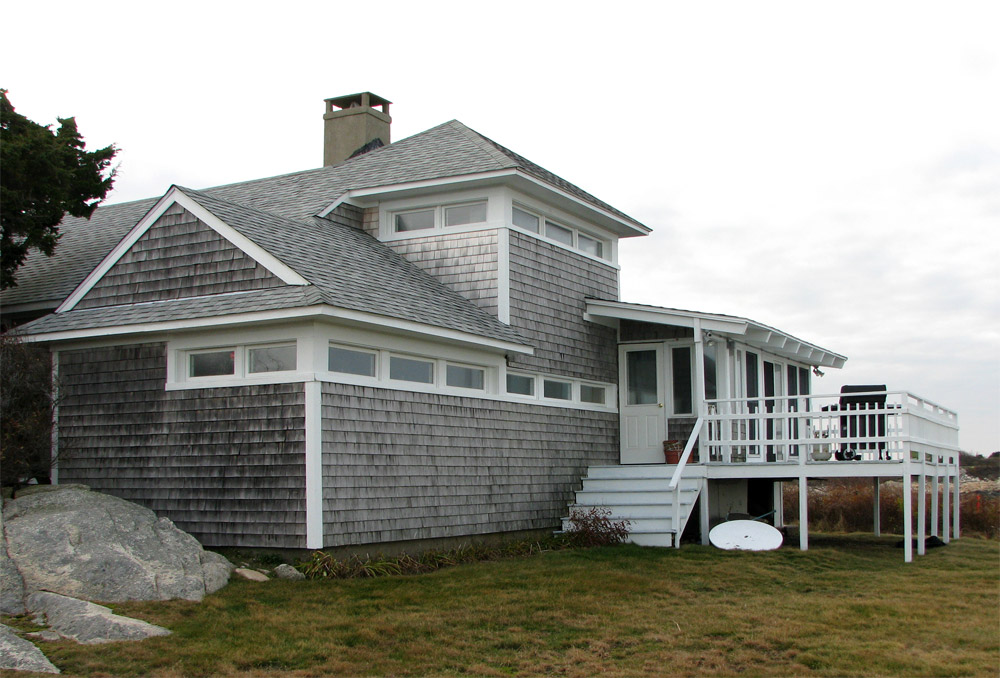
Base End Station Cottage in Minot MA

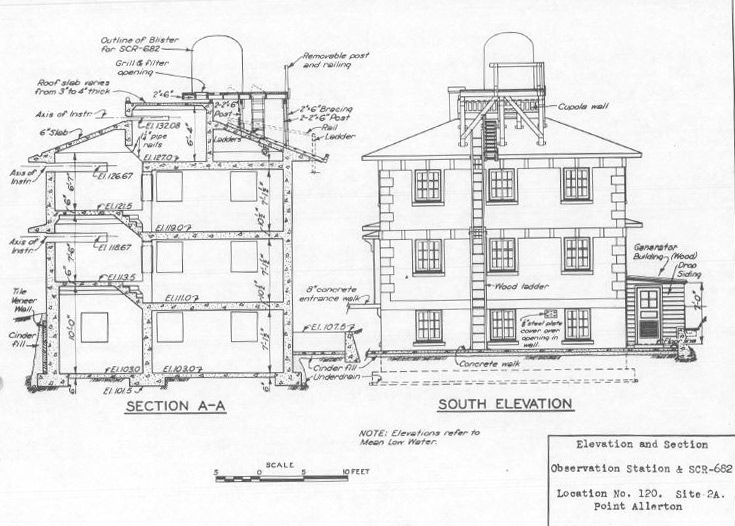
Report of Completed Works Point Allerton MR

=== DPF and CRF Stations ===
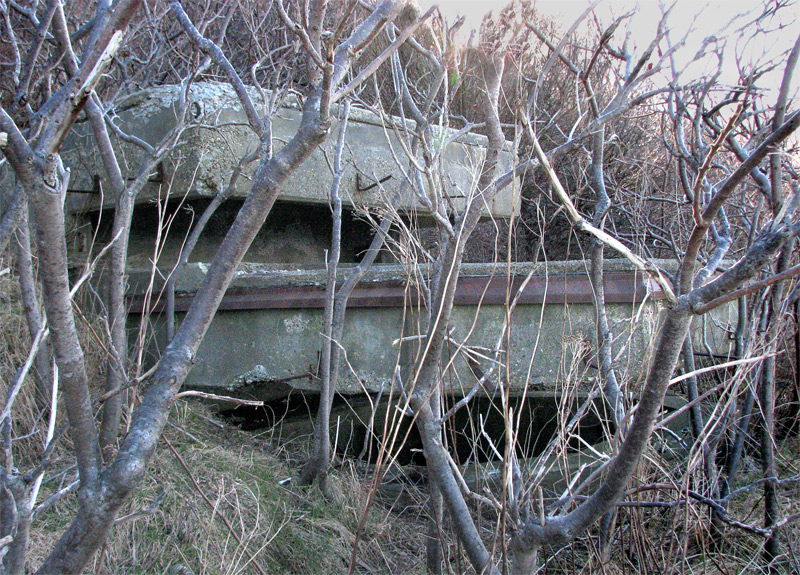
CRF Station at Fort Strong in Boston MA

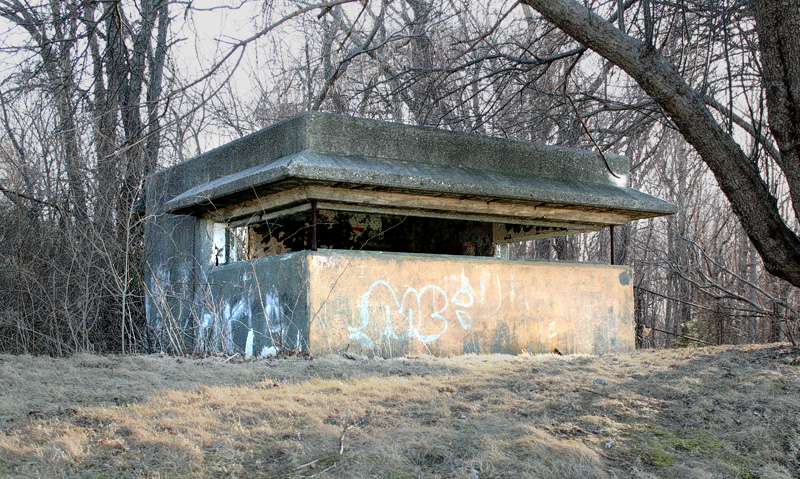
Mine Command Station at Fort Revere

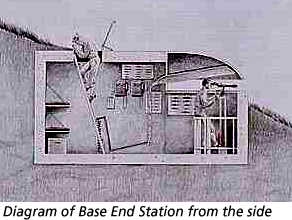

== See also ==
- Fire control tower
- Fire-control system
- Seacoast defense in the United States
- Harbor Defense Command
- List of U.S. Army fire control and sighting material by supply catalog designation
- Gun Data Computer
