= 75 mm field gun =

75 mm field gun can refer to:

- French Canon de 75 modèle 1897
- British 75_mm_Gun_M1917
- Polish 75 mm armata wz. 1902/26pl
