= 75 mm gun M1916 =

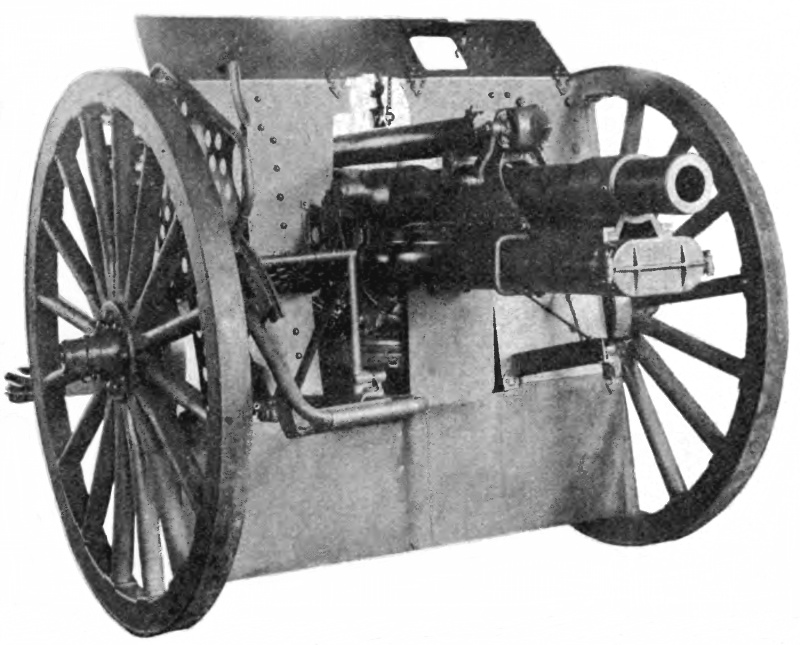
- Type: Field gun
- Place of origin: United States

Service history
- In service: 1916–1942
- Used by: United States
- Wars: World War I

Production history
- Designed: 1916
- Manufacturer: various
- Produced: 1916-ca. 1920
- No. built: 810 guns, 362 field carriages, 51 AA mountings, ca. 150 coast defense and other mountings

Specifications
- Mass: 3,045 lb (1,381 kg) gun and carriage
- Length: 7.58 ft (2.31 m)
- Barrel length: 90.9 inches (231 cm) (28.4 calibers)
- Width: 5 ft track
- Diameter: 4ft 8in wheel
- Shell: fixed 75 x 350mm R
- Shell weight: 11.85 lb (5.38 kg)
- Caliber: 75 mm (3.0 in)
- Breech: drop-block
- Recoil: Hydro-spring
- Carriage: Split trail
- Elevation: 53° (31° to 82° on AA mounting)
- Traverse: 800 Mills (240° on AA mounting)
- Muzzle velocity: 1,742 ft/s (531 m/s)
- Effective firing range: 9,733 yd (8,900 m)
- Maximum firing range: 12,490 yd (11,420 m); 5,500 yd (5,000 m) AA altitude
- Feed system: hand

The 75 mm gun M1916 was a US Army field artillery piece used during and after World War I. It was used as an anti-aircraft gun as well as a field piece. It originated as the 3-inch gun M1913, which was soon modified to the 3-inch gun M1916, which was later altered to the subject weapon.

== History ==
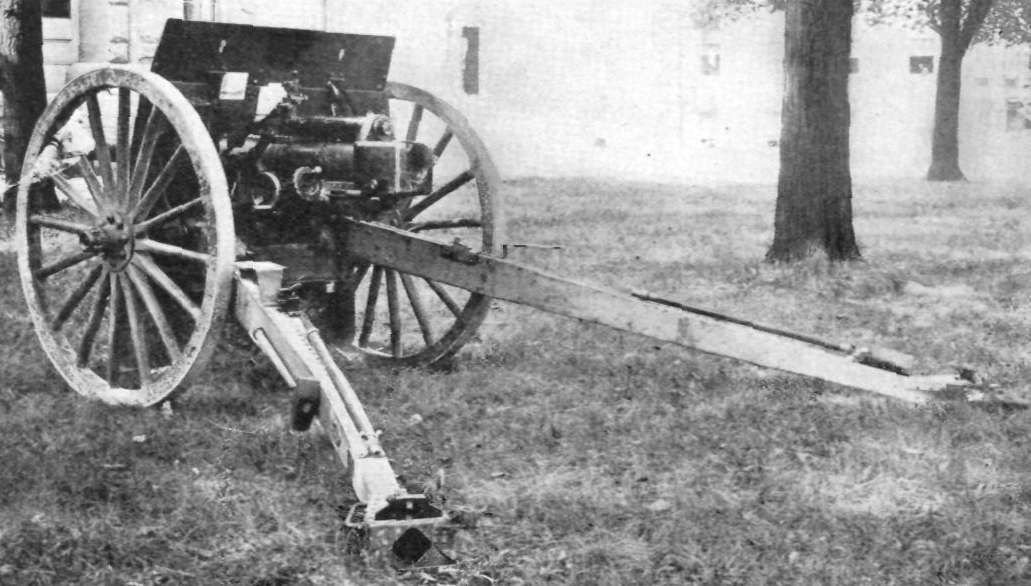
3-inch gun and carriage M1913 (experimental) from the back

This weapon originated with the acquisition in 1912 of a 75 mm gun designed by Col. Deport of the French Army. The US Army wished to examine and adopt a split-trail carriage, which would allow a higher elevation for indirect fire and dropping shells into trenches. This carriage type was used on the prototype 3-inch model of 1913, which was later designated the 3-inch gun M1916 after a major carriage redesign, prompted by field trials of the M1913. By early 1917 only 34 weapons had been completed; one source traces this to the Ordnance Department developing the weapon without input from the Field Artillery, compounded by a complex top carriage intended to allow 45 degrees of traverse. Shortly after the American entry into World War I, the US Army decided to adopt French and British weapons, and modify their own weapons where possible to accept French or British ammunition. The M1916 was modified to a 75 mm bore, including alteration of existing weapons, permitting interchangeability of ammunition with French guns as the 75 mm gun M1916.

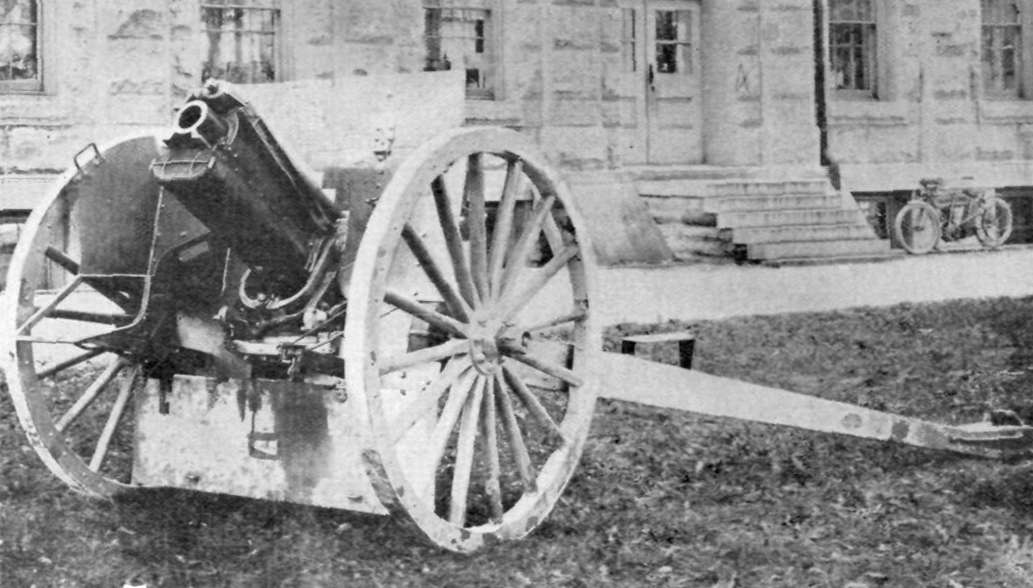
3.8-inch howitzer M1908 on the same experimental carriage M1913, showing the early recoil system from the front

The gun's hydro-spring recoil system consisted of an oil cylinder on top of the barrel and two spring cylinders underneath. It did not work at high elevation angles, and by early 1918 production of the US version of the French Canon de 75 modèle 1897 was emphasized. By the end of 1918, shortly after the war ended, only 251 weapons had been completed; 34 had been shipped to France but did not see action. A combination of a limited pre-war munitions industry, the short (19-month) US participation in the war, technical problems with large-scale production, and the ready availability of munitions in France led to this.

In an attempt to resolve the recoil system problems, hydro-pneumatic recoil cylinders (using compressed air instead of springs) were designed in 1917 by French colonel Émile Rimailho who had earlier participated in the development of the M1897 at the Atelier de Construction de Puteaux. Since Rimailho then worked at the Compagnie des forges et aciéries de la marine et d'Homécourt better known by its location at Saint Chamond, in the US these were called the "St. Chamond" recuperator (touching off a flap in France over the US "stealing" military secrets), but only 60 of these were delivered by the end of 1919. Field trials in France showed that there was excessive play in the elevation and traverse mechanisms, making the gun very inaccurate, along with poor durability in cross-country movement. However, production continued postwar; eventually 810 barrels and 362 field carriages were delivered. The surplus of barrels led to the weapon's use for other purposes.

Carriage orders were 300 in 1916, 340 in May 1917, and 400 to New York Air Brake in June 1917, totaling 1,040, with only 362 completed.

=== Anti-aircraft use ===
51 of these weapons were mounted on 2.5-ton White trucks for anti-aircraft (AA) use, designated the AA truck mount M1917. Some of these weapons reached France before the Armistice, the only US-made AA weapons to do so. These weapons saw some action prior to the war's end and shot down their first aircraft on May 18, 1918 when soldiers of the U.S. 2nd Anti-Aircraft battery downed a German observation plane over no-man's land. Prior to the commencement of this program, 50 AA truck mounts were shipped to France without guns as a stopgap, where French 75s were mounted on them. In total, 100 M1917 AA guns were delivered to the US Army in 1918.

The maximum AA altitude was 5,500 yd (5,000 m) at 82° elevation, limited by a 20-second fuse. The low muzzle velocity and limited elevation and traverse of the AA mounting (31° to 82° elevation, 240° traverse) impaired the weapon's effectiveness. By 1940 the AA version of the weapon was no longer in active service, but a few were retained for training.

== Between World Wars ==
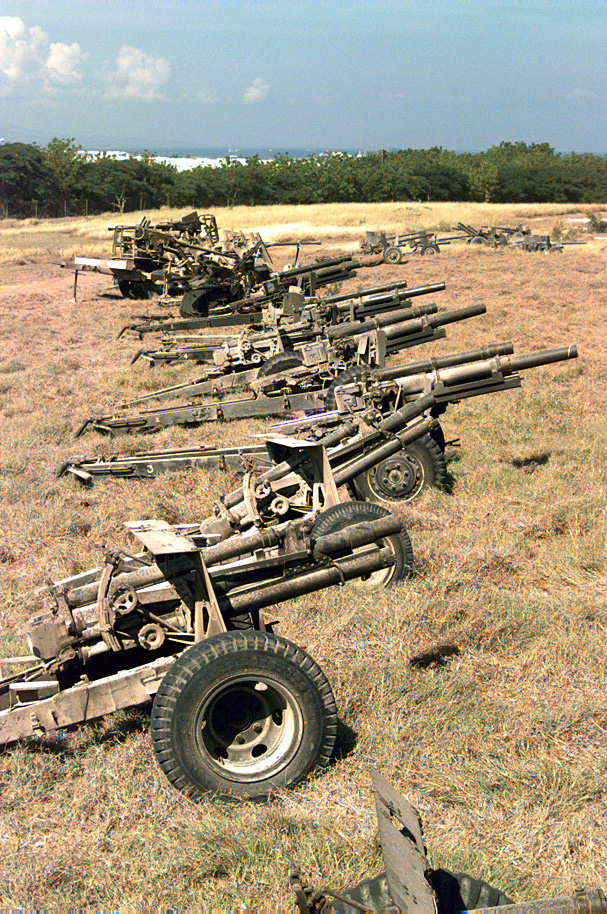
Two M1916 guns converted to motor traction (on the foreground, along with M101 howitzers on the background) captured in Haiti in 1994

Although World War I had shown that light field guns like the M1916 lacked adequate firepower to destroy an entrenched enemy the majority of combatants had large numbers of them and had little impetus to replace them. With a limited peacetime budget, the US Army like other armies opted to modernize its artillery by switching from horse traction to motor traction.

Beginning in 1938, funds were made available for the conversion of 180 of 320 M1916s to use motor traction and nearly all were eventually converted to the new M1916A1 or M1916MIA1 standard. The kits included sprung axles, steel wheels, and pneumatic tires that allow them to be towed at higher speeds.

== World War II ==
=== Australian service ===
An unknown number of guns served with Australian troops who used them as anti-tank guns during the Malayan Campaign.

=== British service ===
Early in World War II Britain lost many of its field guns in France, and in 1941 150 M1916s were supplied to Britain where they were used for training and to equip Home Guard units.

=== Greek service ===
50 guns were supplied to Greece.

=== Haitian service ===
6 M1916s that were supplied to Haiti were captured during Operation Uphold Democracy in 1994.

=== Philippine service ===
14 guns were supplied to the Philippine Army and participated in the Philippines Campaign where all were lost.

=== US service ===
The Coast Artillery Corps deployed about 24 of these weapons on fixed pedestal mounts for land defense in the Panama Canal Zone in 1926, replacing the 4.7 inch howitzer M1913 in this role. An additional 100 barrels were acquired by the Coast Artillery for use in sub-caliber training alongside (or mounted on) large guns, such as the long-range barbette mounting of the 12-inch gun M1895.

=== Yugoslavian service ===
An unknown number were supplied to Yugoslavia but the shipment was diverted while at sea to the Western Desert after the Invasion of Yugoslavia.

== Variants ==
- M1916 mounted on M1916 carriage
- M1916MI mounted on M1916A1 carriage (rubber tire)
- M1916MII mounted on M1916A1 carriage
- M1916MII-1/2 mounted on M1916A1 carriage
- M1916MIII mounted on M1916A1 carriage
- M1916MIII-1/2 mounted on M1916A1 carriage
- M1916MIIIA1 mounted on M1916MI (St. Chamond) carriage
- M1916MIIIA1 mounted on M1916MIA1 carriage
- M1916MIII-1/2A1 mounted on M1916MIA1 carriage
- The antiaircraft model was mounted on a White Motor Company 2.5-ton truck as the AA truck mount M1917.
- An experimental tracked self-propelled mounting, known as the Mark VII Self-Propelled Caterpillar Mount, was tested in the 1920s.

== Support vehicles ==
In World War I, a battery of 75-mm guns was accompanied by the following:

- 75 mm limber M1918
- 75 mm Caisson M1918
- Forge limber M1902M1
- Store limber M1902M1
- Battery and store wagon M1917
- Battery reel M1917
- Reel M1909M1
- Cart M1918

== Gallery ==
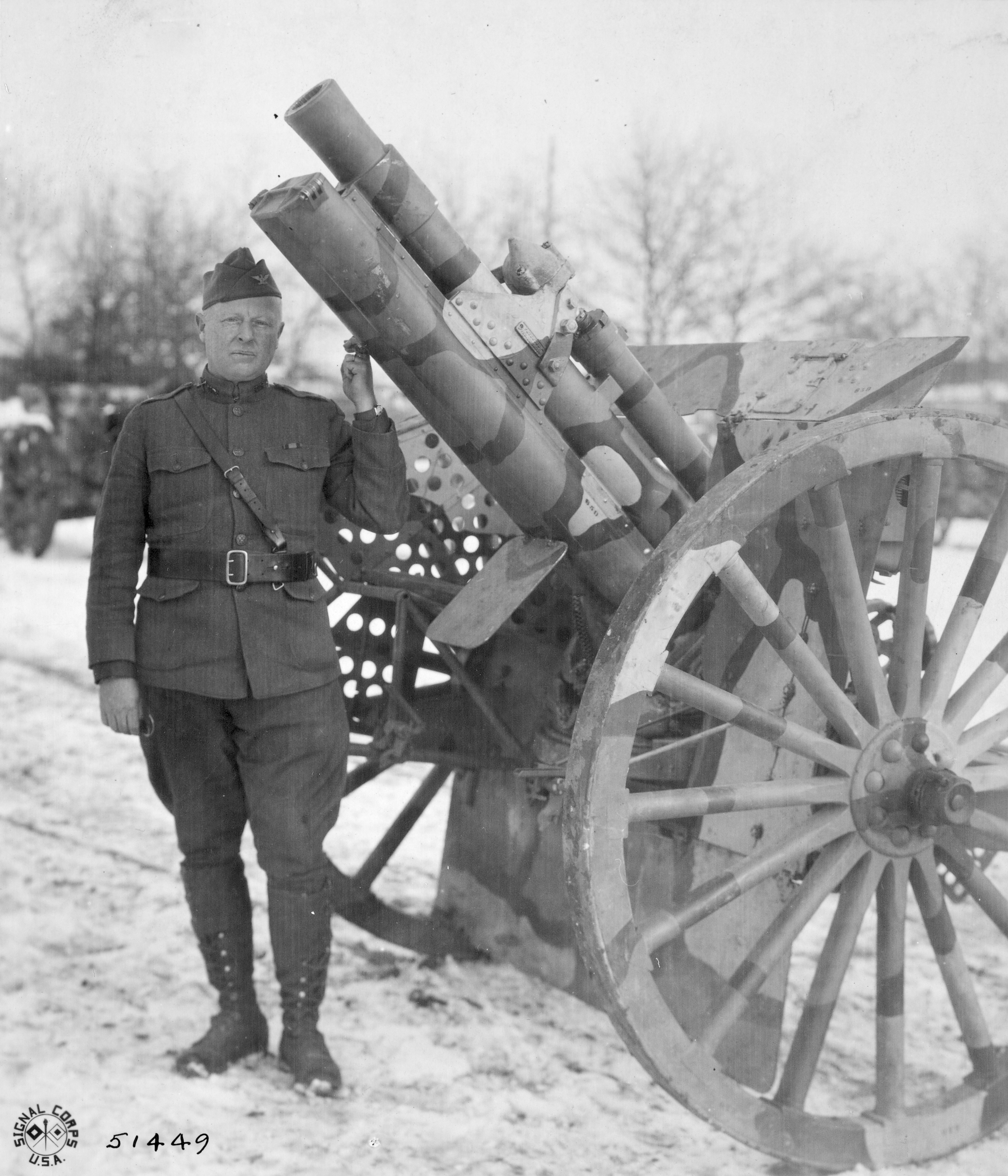
Colonel C. Deems with a 75mm Split trail gun, Le Valdahon, 31 January 1919

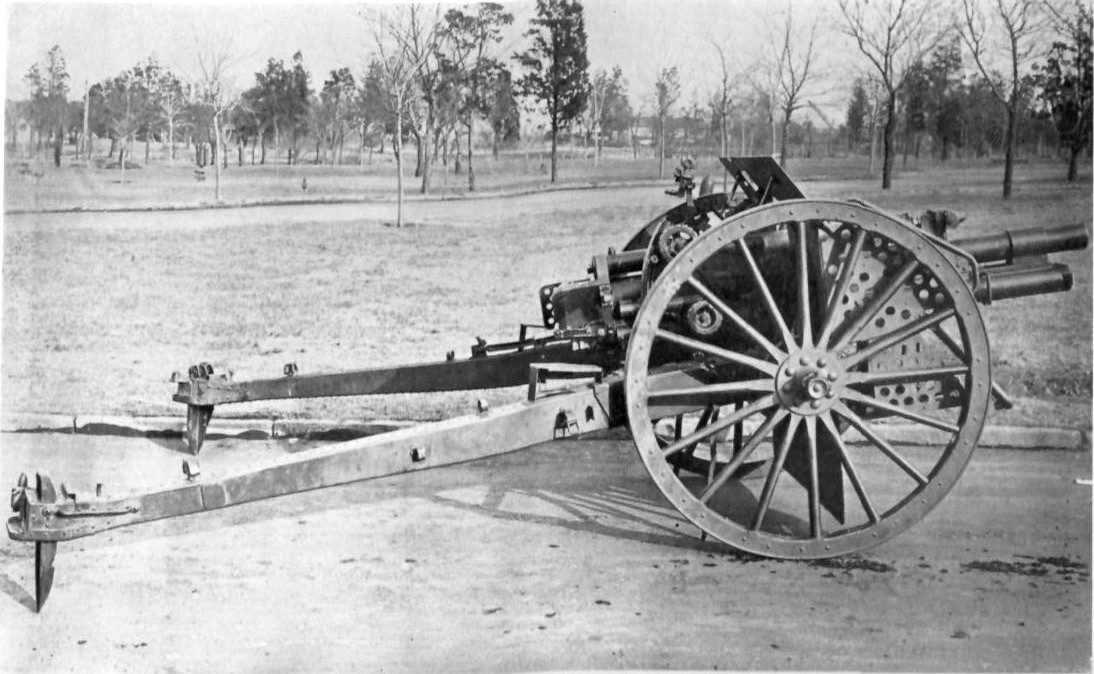
Firing position, right side view

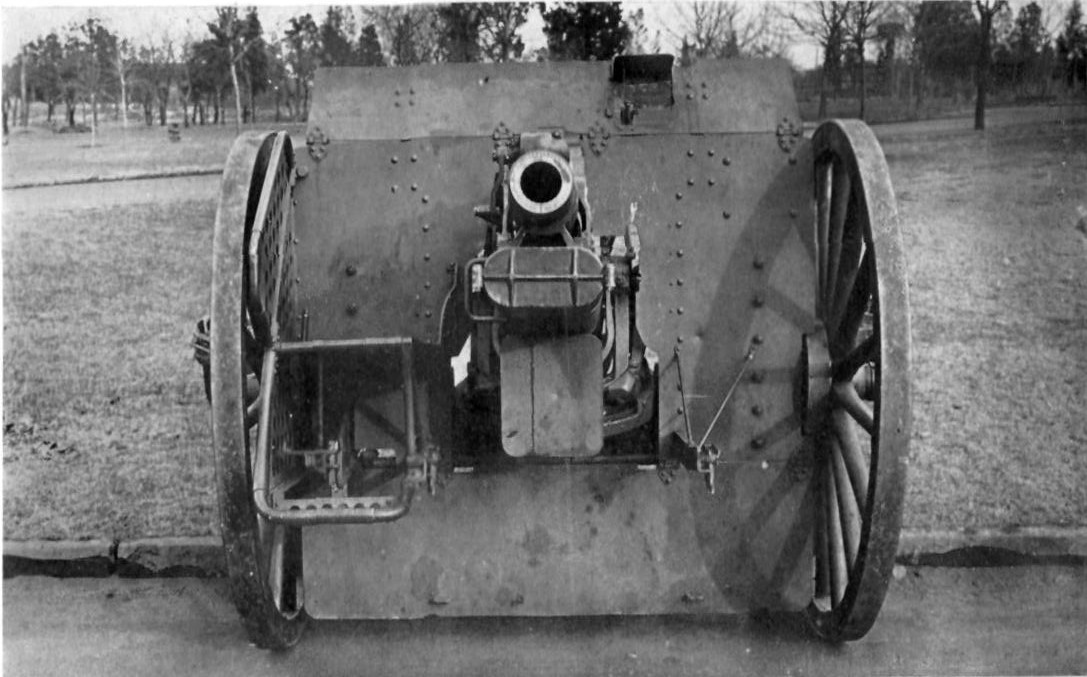
Also in battery, front view

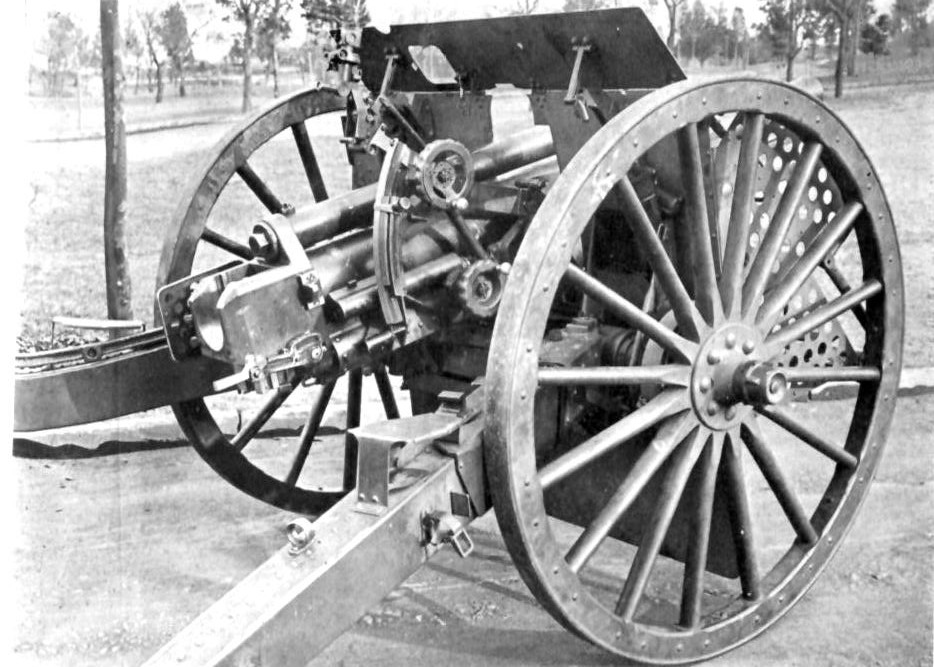
Right rear view

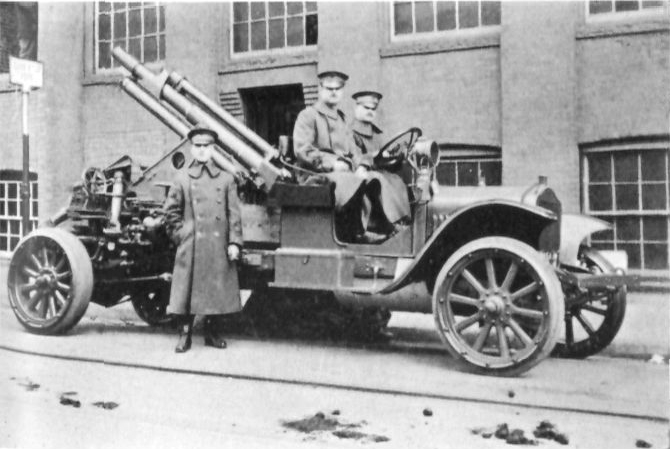
US 75mm gun M1916 AA on White 2.5-ton truck mount.

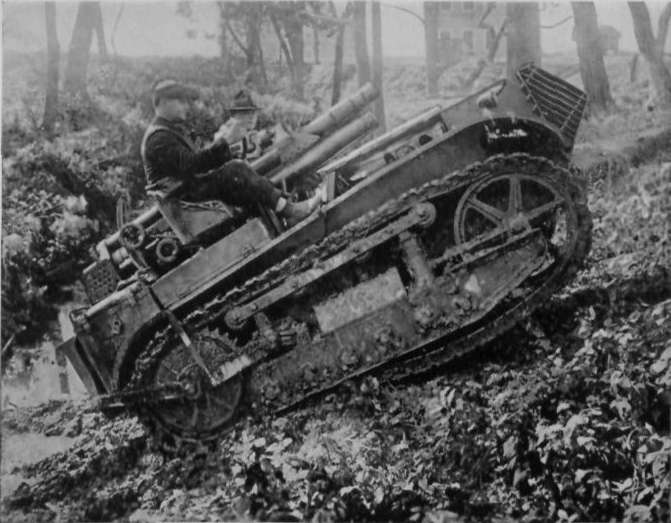
US 75mm gun M1916 on self-propelled carriage.

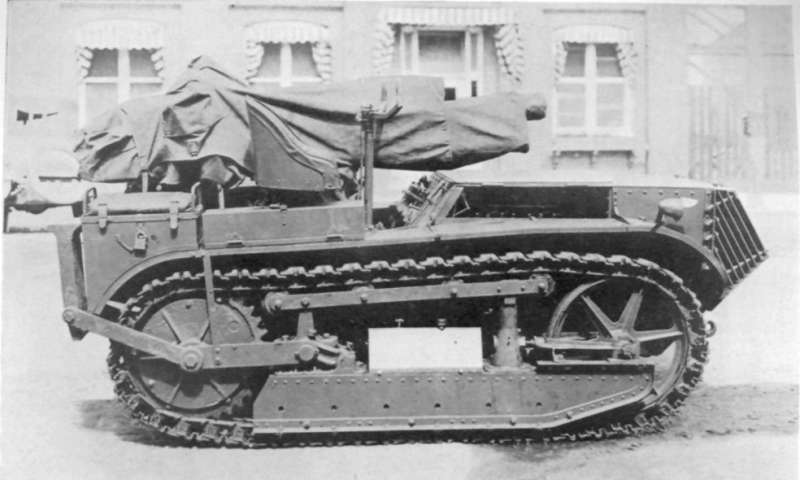
US 75mm gun M1916 on Mark VII SP Caterpillar mount.

== Surviving examples ==
- American Legion post, Champaign, Illinois

== See also ==
- List of U.S. Army weapons by supply catalog designation
- List of artillery by name
- 75 mm gun M1917 (weapon of similar role and era)
- United States home front during World War I
