= List of the United States Army weapons by supply catalog designation =

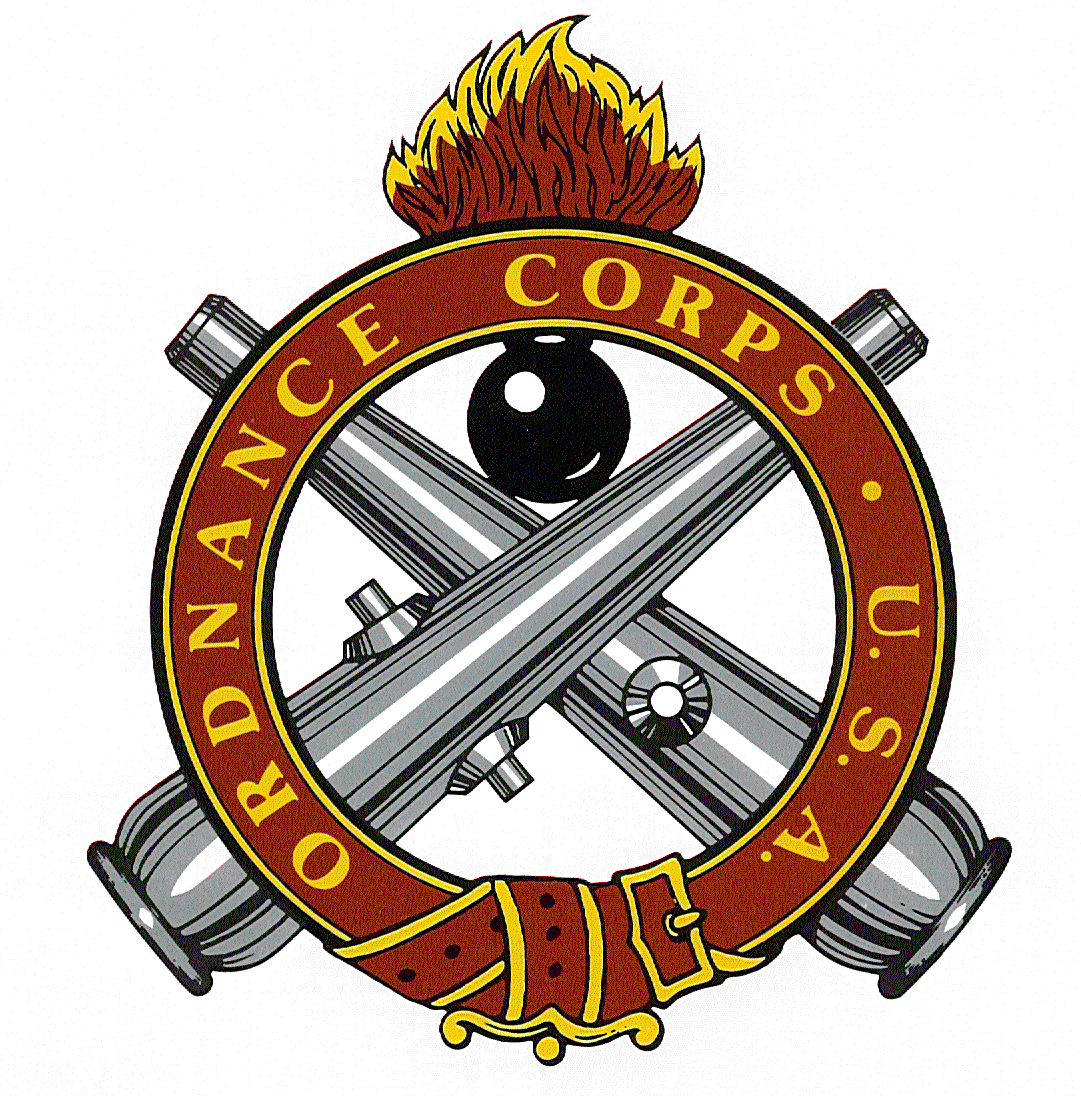
Ordnance crest

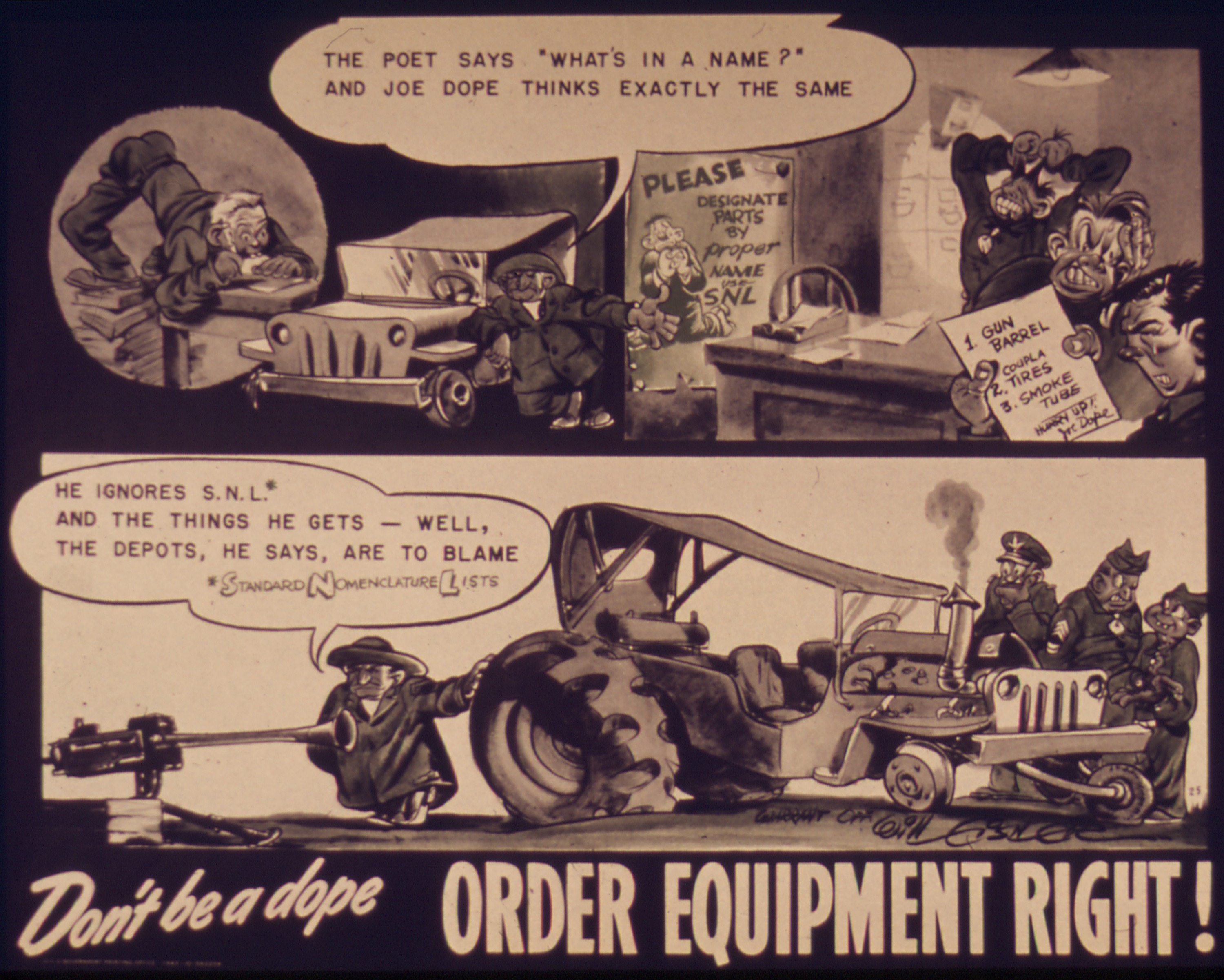
"WHAT'S IN A NAME" - military education about SNL

This is a historic (index) list of United States Army weapons and materiel, by their Standard Nomenclature List (SNL) group and individual designations — an alpha-numeric nomenclature system used in the United States Army Ordnance Corps Supply Catalogues used from about 1930 to about 1958. The July 1943 Ordnance Publications For Supply Index – OPSI – (page2) explains that the "Index of Standard Nomenclature Lists (...) covers – by groups, and subdivisions of groups – all classes of equipment and supplies, assigned to the Ordnance Department for procurement, storage, issue, and maintenance."
The designations in this Wikipedia list represent so-called "major items". For each of the major items, there were separate, designated "Standard Nomenclature Lists" — extensive parts catalogs for supply and repair purposes.

In essence, the index was a list of lists. There could be numerous volumes, changes, and updates under each single item designation.

According to the Corps' Ordnance Publications for Supply Index of July 1943:

- Groups 'A' through 'N' covered "General Ordnance Supplies"; including
  - group 'F' (Fire control, and sighting material), and
  - group 'G' (Tank / Automotive materiel)
- Groups 'P' through 'T' covered "Ammunition" – for which there was an additional AIC code
- Group 'Z' was for "Captured Enemy Material", and
- Group 'OGS' indicated "Obsolete General Supplies".
- Group "Y", for 'Guided Missiles, guidance and control, launching, transporting, radio-controlled, and handling material, was added after July 1943

== War Department Catalog ==
- WD CAT. ORD 1 Introduction to Ordnance catalog
- WD CAT. ORD 2 Index to Ordnance supply catalog
- WD CAT. ORD 3 list of items for issue to troops, posts, camps, and stations.
- WD CAT. ORD 4 Allowances of expendable supplies
- WD CAT. ORD 5 Stock list of items
- WD CAT. ORD 5-1 Numerical index of manufacturer's part numbers, and drawing numbers
- WD CAT. ORD 6 Tools, and tool sets
- WD CAT. ORD 7 Organizational Maintenance Allowances.
- WD CAT. ORD 8 Field and Depot Maintenance Allowances.
- WD CAT. ORD 9 List of all service parts.
- WD CAT. ORD 10 tool load, and supply guide
- WD CAT. ORD 11 Ammunition
- WD CAT. ORD 12 Obsolete general supplies
- WD CAT. ORD 13 Parts common to two or more major items
- WD CAT. ORD 14-1 Interchangeability lists for tanks, and vehicles of related chassis.
- WD CAT. ORD 14-2 Interchangeability list
  - Volume 1 Interchangeability list for ordnance, general purpose and combat vehicles (except full track vehicles) group 0-0800
  - Volume 2 Interchangeability list for ordnance, general purpose and combat vehicles (except full track vehicles) group 0900-2500
- WD CAT. ORD 15-1 (Ordnance numbers) Cross reference list of ordnance part, and stock numbers (ten volumes)
- WD CAT. ORD 15-2 (stock numbers) (ten volumes)
- WD CAT. ORD 16 Captured Foreign Material

== Group "A" material ==
Automatic weapons, small mortars, carts, and light artillery

- A1 Major items, and Major combinations of
- A2 Cal. .50 machine gun Browning M1921 water cooled
- A3 Material, antiaircraft, automatic gun - Parts and equipment
- A4 Cal. .30 Browning Automatic Rifle M1918, and M1918A1
- A5 Cal. .30 machine gun M1917A- (M1917 Browning machine gun)
- A6 Cal. .30 machine gun M1919A- (M1919 Browning machine gun)
- A7 37 mm gun carriage M1916A1, A2
- A8 ammunition cart machine gun M1917
- A9 37 mm ammunition cart M1917
- A10 Items not authorized for general use
- A11 Lewis aircraft machine gun, cal. .30 M1918, parts and equipment.
- A12 Cal. .30 machine gun M1918 aircraft
- A13 Cal. .30 machine gun M1918M1 aircraft
- A14 Cal. .30 machine gun, Marlin, aircraft M1916
- A15 Gun 37 mm, and tank cradle M1916
- A16 2.24-inch tank gun (6LB)
- A17 Hangers, pack, gun and ammunition - Parts and equipment
- A18 Cal. .30 machine rifle M1922
- A19 Parts Common for Group A Materiel
- A20 Cal. .50 machine gun Browning M1921 aircraft
- A21 cart mortar light, M1
- A22 cart communications, telephone M1
- A23 75 mm mortar M1, M2
- A24 Cart (provisional) - Parts and equipment
  - Cart, communication, radio (provisional).
  - Cart, communication, telephone (provisional).
  - Cart, mortar, light (provisional).
- A25 37 mm gun carriage M2
- A26 cart M2
- A27 Gun, subcaliber, M1 for 2.24" (6-Pdr.) tank gun, Mk. II (British)
- A28 Cal. .30 fixed aircraft machine gun, M2 (M2 Browning machine gun)
- A29 37 mm M1A2 on carriage M3A1 (37mm Gun M1)
- A30 wheeled machine gun mount M1
- A31
- A32 Cal. .45 machine gun, M1928A1 (Thompson submachine gun)
- A33 81 mm mortar M1 and M4
- A34 3-inch trench mortar MK1
- A35 "Tool, Maintenance, for Repair of Group A Materiel" Dated 1 July 1945
- A36 Cal. .50 aircraft machine gun basic, M2
- A37 Cal. .50 water cooled machine gun, AA, M2
- A38 Cal. .50 machine gun AN/M2 (aircraft)
- A39 Cal. .50 machine gun heavy, aircraft fixed, M2
- A40 Cal. .22 machine gun trainer M1
- A41
- A42 M3 and M3A4 hand cart, general utility
  - M3 and M3A4 hand cart, general utility.
  - M4 hand cart, M3 cart configured for transportation of .30-caliber M1917A1 Browning Machinegun.
  - M4A1 hand cart, M3A4 cart configured for transportation of .30-caliber M1917A1 Browning Machinegun.
  - M5 hand cart, M3 cart configured for transportation of .50-caliber M2 Browning Heavy Machinegun.
  - M5A1 hand cart, M3A4 cart configured for transportation of .50-caliber M2 Browning Heavy Machinegun.
  - M6 hand cart, M3 cart configured for transportation of 81mm M1 Medium Mortar.
  - M6A1 hand cart, M3A4 cart configured for transportation of 81mm M1 Medium Mortar.
- A43 60 mm mortar M2 and M19
- A44 37 mm gun M3 on carriage M4
- A45 37 mm gun M6 on M23 mount (M3 Stuart)
- A46 37 mm gun, automatic, M4 and M10
- A47 20 mm gun, automatic, M1 and AN/M2 (Aircraft), AN/M3, and M24)
- A48 subcaliber device
  - S1
  - S2
  - S3
  - S4 Rifle M2A1 .22 Cal.
  - S5 subcaliber device M5 Cal. .22 rifle
  - S6 Rifle M1903A2 .30 Cal
  - S7 Trainer machine gun Cal.22 M3 and M4
  - S8 Trainer machine gun Cal.30 T9
  - S9
  - S10 mortar, subcaliber, 60 mm, M28, M31
- A49 Rifle, automatic, cal. .30, Browning M1918A2
- A50 40 mm automatic gun M1; on M2 carriage
- A51 Unassigned (Mount, truck, pedestal, M24A1, now assigned SNL A-55)
- A52 Cal. .45 submachine gun, M2
- A53 20 mm gun automatic M1, AN/M2, AN/M3, and M24
- A54 Mount, machine gun, twin, cal. 50, M33
- A55 mounts small arms for motor vehicles. (A55 contains at least 56 sections)
  - S1 Introduction and index
  - S2 3.5-inch Ball mount, M13
  - S3 mount bracket M20
  - S4 Left sponson mount and right sponson mount, parts and equipment. (M2 Light Tank)
  - S5 combination gun mount, M22
  - S6 combination gun mount, M23, M23A2
  - S7 mount machine gun, cal. .30, M26
  - S8 mount bow gun, cal. .30. M27
  - S9 combination gun mount, M24, and M2A1
  - S10 mount machine gun Cal. .50 (D59530) (M4 Sherman)
  - S11 Mount, ball, cal. .30 (D51070) (M4 Sherman)
  - S12 37 mm gun mount, M25, and M26
  - S13 mount ball, (D59830)
  - S14 Cal. .30, MG mount, M29
  - S15 Cal. .50 MG mount, M30,
  - S16 mount truck pedestal, M24, and M24A1, (Dodge WC series)
  - S17 mount truck pedestal, M25
  - S18 mount truck pedestal, M31
  - S19 truck mounts, M32, M36, and M37
  - S20 mount machine gun, cal. .30, T53
  - S21 mount pedestal, machine gun, M4
  - S22 combination gun mount, T55
  - S23 Mount, machine gun Cal. .30 (D40771)
  - S24 combination gun mount M44
  - S25 Mount, machine gun, cal. .30 (E6160)
  - S26 Mount Machine gun, Twin, cal. .50 (T-52) (M6 heavy tank)
  - S27 Ring mount, M41 for Cal. .30 MG
  - S28 Cal. .30, or .50 MG mount, M35, and M35C
  - S29 mount machine gun, AA, cal. .50. (D60258)
  - S30 mount, machine gun Cal. .50, (D69820)
  - S31 mount bracket, M40
  - S32 Cal. .30 MG mount, M48
  - S33 Mount, pedestal, machine gun, cal. .50, M39, mount, pedestal, machine gun, cal. .50, M43, and mount, pedestal, machine gun, twin, cal. .50, M46, organizational spare parts and equipment.
  - S34 Cal. .30 MG mount (D78272)
  - S35 Mount, antiaircraft gun Cal. .30 (D60490)
  - S36 Mount, flexible bow gun. (D71797)
  - S37 Mount, machine gun, A A, cal. .30 (D41488)
  - S38 Mount, machine gun, A A, cal. .50 (D80030)
  - S39 Mount, Bow gun, cal. .30 (D97194)
  - S40 Mount, machine gun, A A, cal. .50 (D70627)
  - S41 Mount, flexible bow gun. (D67194)
  - S42 Cal. .30 MG, ball mount
  - S43 Mount machine gun AA, cal. .50?
  - S44 Mount, ring, M66
  - S45 Mount Pedestal Machine Gun (7115438) 1956
  - S46 Mount, Machine Gun, cal. .30 (D76459)(M24 Chaffee)
  - S47 Mount ball Cal.30 (7058104)
  - S48
  - S49
  - S50 Ring mount, M49, M49A1, M49A1C, and Mount truck, M32, M36, M37, M50, M56, M58, M59, M60, M61.
  - S51 Mount truck M57
  - S52 Mount truck M58
  - S53 Mount truck M59
  - S54 Mount truck M60
  - S55 Mount truck M61
  - S56 Mount ring, M68
- A56 trainer machine gun M9
- A57 37mm gun automatic, AN/M9
- A58 Cal. .45 submachine gun M3 (grease gun), (M3 submachine gun)
- A59 Cal. .50 machine gun heavy, turret type, M2
- A60 Cart, utility, light weight.
- A61 Quadmount M55
- A62 2-Inch Mortar M3
- A63
- A64 Gun machine. Cal. .60 T17E3
- A65
- A66
- A67 Gun, machine, cal. .50, AN-M3 aircraft basic.
- A68
- A69 Cart, hand, M7, and M9
- A70 Mortar, 4.2-inch, M2
- A71 Machine, Linking, Powered. Cal. .50. M5. and Delinker, M7
- A72 Sled Artillery M2 M2C M3 M4 M5 M6 M7 M8 M9 M10 M10C and M12 Ski Snow M13 1950
- A73 Gun, Automatic, 20 mm, M24, M24A1, M24E2 Repositioner 20 mm M17 1955
- A74 Mount Ball, cal. .30 (7722940)
- A75 Mount, machine gun, cal. .30 or Cal. .50 (7069694)
- A76 Mount, and shield, Machine gun, cal. .30 (7326774)
- A77 .50 Cal. subcaliber mount M19
- A78 Mount, ball, cal. .30 (7722408)
- A79 Machine Repositioning Cal .50 M15 1950
- A80 Mount machine gun, cal. .50, M69.
- A81 Mount machine gun, cal. .30, M70.
- A82 Mortar 81 mm, M29/M23 /w baseplate M23A1, A2, A3 Parts /Jul 1956 (M29 mortar)
- A83 Linker, powered. 20 mm, M16, (T-27)
- A84 Mount twin, machine gun, T122
- A85 Mortar, 4.2-inch, M30, T104
- A86 Mount tripod weapon, M74, (T113E2)
- A87
- A88. 50 machine gun mount AA
- A89 Cal. .30 Machine gun, M37, (Patton series Tanks)
- A90 .30 cal. machine gun mount
- A91 Gun, automatic, cal. .60, T130E3, E4, M38
  - Gun, automatic, 20 mm, T160E3, M39, M39A1 M39 cannon
- A92 Cradle, pintle, and ammunition box tray, machine gun, cal. .30 or Cal. .50 (E10014)
- A93 Mount machine gun, AA, cal. .50
- A94 Machine, repositioning, 20 mm, M17
- A95 Gun automatic, 30 mm, T121, T182.
- A96 Mount, Ring, Machine gun, cal. .50, M81
- A97 Mount, ring, machine gun, cal. .50, (8691154)
- A98 Mount, Commander's Cupola & Cal. .50 AA Machine Gun (8797700) & (8704789)
- A99
- A100

== Group "B" material ==
Revolvers, pistols, shotguns, arms chests, rocket launchers

- B1 Major items of group B material
- B2
- B3 U.S. Rifle, M1903 rifle, cal. .30 M1903 Springfield
- B4 U.S. Rifle, cal. .30, M1917 (Enfield) M1917 Enfield
- B5 Gallery practice rifle, cal. .22 M1903
- B6 Pistol, Automatic, cal. .45, M1911 and M1911A1
- B7 Pistol, Revolver, cal. .45, M1917 (M1917 revolver)
- B8 Bayonet, M1905, M1917 and M1; Bayo-Knife, M4 (M1 bayonet)
- B9 Shotguns 12 gauge
- B10 Rifle, U.S., cal. .30 M1903, Mk.I (special) - Parts and equipment
- B11 Items not authorized for general use
- B12 Very pistol, 25 mm, MK 4, parts and equipment.
- B13 Helmet steel, M1917A1, M1917. (Brodie helmet)
- B14 Tools for reloading small arms ammunition, parts and equipment.
- B15 Items common to 2 or more Group B products.
- B16 List of all Parts of Arms Locker, Arm Rack, Arm Repair Chest, and Pistol Cleaning Kit
- B17 Rifle, U.S., cal. .22 M1922, M1, and M2
- B18 Pistol, Pyrotechnic, M2
- B19 Pyrotechnic projector, ground M1A1
- B20 Tools, Maintenance For Repair Of Group B Materiel (Handguns, Small Arms, and Pyrotechnic Projectors)
- B21 Rifle, U.S., cal. .30 M1, M1C, M1D (Sniper's) (M1 Garand)
- B22 Interchangeability chart
- B23 Pistol, Very, 10-gauge, Mk. III and M5
- B24 Projector, signal, ground, M3 and M4
- B25 Rifle Cal. .22 commercial type (Remington Rifle Cal. .22 M513T, Stevens Rifle Cal. .22 M416-2, Winchester Rifle Cal. .22 M75)
- B26
- B27
- B28 Carbine cal..30 M1, M1A1, M2 AND M3 (M1 carbine)
- B29 Cal22, Ruger. Mark I, Target Model. Revolver, Colt, Cal38, Special, Detective Special, 2-Inch Barrel; Revolver, (Colt Detective Special)
- B30 Pistol, Colt, cal. .22, Ace.
- B31 pistol, automatic .22 Colt, Woodsman, match target, and standard.
- B32 Pistol, Automatic .22 High Standard Model B and HD 1944 (High Standard .22 Pistol)
- B33 Pistol, pyrotechnic, with Mount, AN-M8
- B34 Discharger, pyrotechnic, AN-M5
- B35 Pistol, Automatic, cal. .32. 380, Colt
- B36 M1 rocket launcher (bazooka)
  - M1 rocket launcher
  - M1A1 rocket launcher
- B37 M3 Trench knife (M3 Fighting Knife)
- B38 Projector, pyrotechnic, hand, M9
- B39 Launcher, grenade, M1 and M2, M7 and M8 M7 grenade launcher
- B40 Projector, signal, ground, M1A1
- B41 M9 rocket launcher (bazooka)
  - M9 rocket launcher
  - M9A1 rocket launcher
  - M18 rocket launcher
- B42 M20, M20B1, rocket launcher (Bazooka)
- B43 Rifle, Survival, cal..22, M4 (T38) (Hornet) (M4 Survival Rifle)
- B44 Launcher Rocket, Repeating, 3.5-inch, M25, (T115E1). and tripod M77
- B45 Rifle / Shotgun- Cal. .22/.410 gauge. M6 survival (M6 Aircrew Survival Weapon)
- B46 Pistol marine, signal, 37 mm, (7162921)
- B47 Revolver, lightweight, cal. .38 special, M12, and M13 (Smith & Wesson Model 12).
- B48 Rifle spotting, cal. .50, M8 (for M40 recoilless rifle)
- B49 Pistol, Automatic, cal. .22, High Standard, Supermatic; Pistol, Automatic,
- B50 Rifle, Cal30-06, Winchester, Model 70, Special Match Grade; Rifle, Cal.
- B51
- B52
- B53
- B54
- B55
- B56
- B57
- B58
- B59
- B60

== Group "C" material ==
Pack, light, and medium field artillery as well as limbers and caissons

- C1 Major items of Pack, Light, and medium field artillery, and armament of these calibers for airplane and combat vehicles
- C2 Carriage, M1916 for 75 mm gun M1916 (wooden wheel)

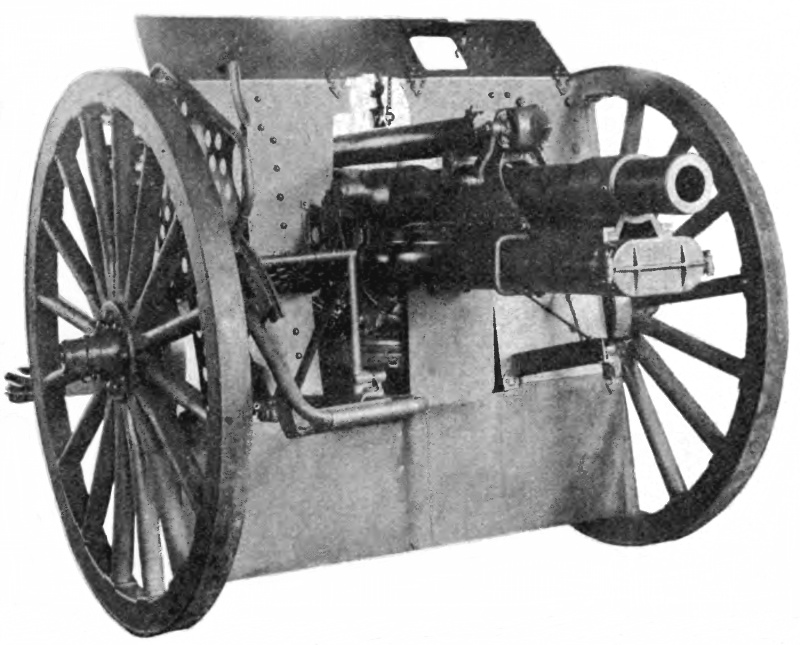
C2 Carriage, 75 mm Gun Model 1916

- C3 carriage, M1918, for Howitzer 155 mm, M1918, (wooden wheel) (Canon de 155 C modèle 1917 Schneider)
- C4 Gun and carriage, 75 mm, M1897MI, and M1897MIA2 (wooden wheel) (Canon de 75 modèle 1897)
- C5 Caisson, 75 mm gun, M1918. limber caisson
- C6 Items common to 2 or more Group C materiel.
- C7 Limber and caisson, for 155 mm howitzer, M1917, M1918 (Canon de 155 C modèle 1917 Schneider)
- C8 Wagon, battery and store, M1917; Limber, forge, M1902MI; Limber, store, M1902MI - Parts and equipment, 25 Feb. 1925
- C9 Carriage, M1917 for 75 mm (British) (wooden wheel)(75 mm gun M1917)
- C10 Cart, battery, reel, M1917A2
- C11 Cart, artillery, reel, M1909M1, M1918
- C12 Gun 75 mm, M1897A2, and M1897A4, on Carriage M2A3 (Canon de 75 modèle 1897)
- C13 Reloading and cleaning outfits, parts.
- C14 Subcaliber and drill cartridge kits, parts.
- C15 Items not authorized for general use.
- C16 Gun and Carriage, mountain, 2.95" - Parts and equipment, including pack equipment. (QF 2.95-inch mountain gun)
- C17 carriage M1917, for 155 mm, howitzer M1917, (wooden wheel)
- C18 Tools, Maintenance, for repair of pack, light and medium field artillery; and armament of these calibers for airplane and combat vehicles
- C19
- C20 Howitzer pack, 75 mm M1A1. on Carriage M8 (75 mm Pack Howitzer M1)
- C21 Howitzer, 105 mm M2A1. on mount M4, and M4A1. (M101 howitzer)
- C22 Parts and accessories for 3" materiel (except guns and carriage); 4.7" materiel; 60 Pdr. materiel (3-inch M1902 field gun, 4.7-inch gun M1906, BL 60-pounder gun)
- C23 Materiel, howitzer, 105mm (German) - Parts and equipment (10.5 cm leFH 16)
- C24 Guns, 3", M1902, M1904, M1905 and Carriage, M1902 -Parts and equipment (3-inch M1902 field gun)
- C25 Gun and carriage, 75 mm, M1897A4 (high speed)
- C26 Howitzer, pack, M1, and M1A1. on Carriage M3A3
- C27 Carriage Gun, 75 mm, M1917A1 (high speed) (75 mm gun M1917)
- C28 Howitzer, 155 mm, M1918. on Carriage M1918A3 (high speed)
- C29 Limber, light, M2, and Caisson, light, M1.
- C30 Carriage M1916A1 for 75 mm gun, (high speed) (75 mm gun M1916)
- C31 Howitzer, 155 mm, M1917A2, and carriage M1917A4
- C32
- C33 Subcaliber mounts? (at least 18 sections)
  - S1
  - S2
  - S3
  - S4
  - S5 Mount Subcaliber, 37mm, M5
  - S6
  - S7 Mount subcaliber, 37mm, M13A1
  - S8
  - S9 Mount subcaliber M14 (for 57mm)(Can take .22 or .30 Rifle)
  - S10
  - S11 Mount subcaliber, Cal .50, M10
  - S12
  - S13 Gun 37mm, M1916
  - S14
  - S15 Gun Subcaliber, 37mm, M12. (for 75mm pack)
  - S16 Gun Subcaliber M13 (for 105mm Howitzer)
  - S17 Gun Subcaliber M15 (for 76mm Gun)
  - S18 cartridge training subcaliber, 75 mm, M34
  - S19 cartridge training subcaliber, 57 mm, T12E1
- C34 gun, 75 mm, M2 and M3 (tank) and mount gun 75 mm, M1. (75 mm gun M2/M3/M6), (M4 Sherman)
- C35
- C36 gun, 57 mm, M1 on Carriage, M1A2 (Ordnance QF 6 pounder)
- C37
- C38 gun, 4.5-inch, M1. on Carriage M1A1 (4.5-inch gun M1)
- C39 howitzer, 155 mm, M1. on mount M14 (M114 155 mm howitzer)
- C40 gun, 3-inch, M5. on carriage M1. (3-inch gun M5)
- C41 gun, 57 mm, M1. recoil mechanism, M12, and mount T5
- C42
- C43 Gun 3-inch, M7. on mount M5. (M10 tank destroyer)
- C44 Gun, 75 mm, M3. on mount M34, and M34A1
- C45 Howitzer, 105 mm M2A1. on mount M4 (105 mm Howitzer M2)
- C46 Gun, 76 mm, M1, and M1A1 (tank) and mount gun combination, M34A1 (76 mm gun M1)
- C47 Gun, 75 mm, M4. on airplane mount M6
- C48 Gun, 75 mm, M1897A4. on mount M3
- C49 Gun, 75 mm, M1897A4. on mount M5
- C50 Howitzer, 105 mm, M3. on Carriages M3, and M3A1
- C51 Howitzer, 75 mm, M3. on mount M7 and M12
- C52 Gun, 75 mm, M3. and mount combination M47
- C53 Gun, 3-inch, M7, and mount combination T49
- C54 Howitzer, pack, 75 mm, M1A1. on Carriage M8
- C55
- C56 Stabilizers all types
- C57 Howitzer, 75 mm, M1A1. on mount T10
- C58 Gun, 76 mm, M1A1C, and M1A2. on mount M1
- C59 Trailer ammunition, M10
- C60 Gun, 75 mm, T13E1. on Aircraft mount T13E2, (AN-M9 Mount), (AN-M5A1 Gun)
- C61 Gun, 75 mm, M10. on aircraft mount M10
- C62 Howitzer, 105 mm, M2A1. and mount howitzer M3
- C63 Howitzer, 105 mm, M4. on mount M5 (tank-mounted version)
- C64 Gun, 76 mm, M1A1C, and M1A1. on mount M62
- C65
- C66 Gun, 75 mm, M6. on mount M17, and M64
- C67 M23 Rocket Launcher
- C68
- C69 Gun, 90 mm, M3. on mount M67 (90 mm Gun M1/M2/M3)
- C70
- C71
- C72
- C73 Recoilless Rifle, 57 mm T-15E3, and M18 (M18 recoilless rifle)
- C74 Recoilless Rifle, 75 mm T-21, and M20 (M20 recoilless rifle)
- C75
- C76 Mount Howitzer, 105 mm, M5.
- C77 Rifle, 105 mm, M27A1; Mount, Rifle, 105 mm, M75, and 75A1
- C78
- C79
- C80
- C81 Launcher, rocket, multiple, 7.2-inch, M24.
- C82 Gun, 76 mm, M32 (T91E3); and Mount, Combination Gun, M76 (T138E1) and M76A1 (T138E2)
- C83 Mount, Howitzer, 75 mm, M12.
- C84 Gun, 76 mm, M48, T124E2, and carriage, M29
- C85 Launch, rocket, multiple, 4.5-inch, T106E1
- C86 Cannon, Howitzer, 105 mm, M-49 (T96E1); Mount, Howitzer, 105 mm, M-85 (T67E1)
- C87 Launcher, rocket, 6.5-inch, T117.
- C88 Gun, 3-inch, T98, and mount combination, T136
- C89 Howitzer, 105 mm, T79. and carriage, T55.
- C90 Launcher, Rocket, Multiple, 4.5-Inch, M21 (T123)
- C91 Mount, Tripod 75 mm, rifle, M1917A2:
- C92 Howitzer, 110 mm, T142, T143. and carriage T74.
- C93 Rifle, 106 mm, M40; Mount, 106 mm Rifle, M79 M40 recoilless rifle
- C94
- C95
- C96
- C97
- C98
- C99
- C100

== Group "D" material ==
Heavy field artillery

- D1 Major items of heavy field artillery
- D2 Major items of antiaircraft artillery
- D3 Materiel, howitzer, 8" - Parts and equipment (BL 8 inch Howitzer Mk VI – VIII)
- D4 Material, Howitzer, 240 mm, M1918A2. (M1918 240 mm howitzer)
- D5 3-inch Stokes trench mortar, Mk. 1 (Stokes Mortar)
- D6 Mortar, trench, 6" - Parts and equipment (Newton 6 inch Mortar)
- D7 Mount, truck, antiaircraft, M1917, for 75mm gun, M1916 - Parts and equipment (75 mm gun M1916)

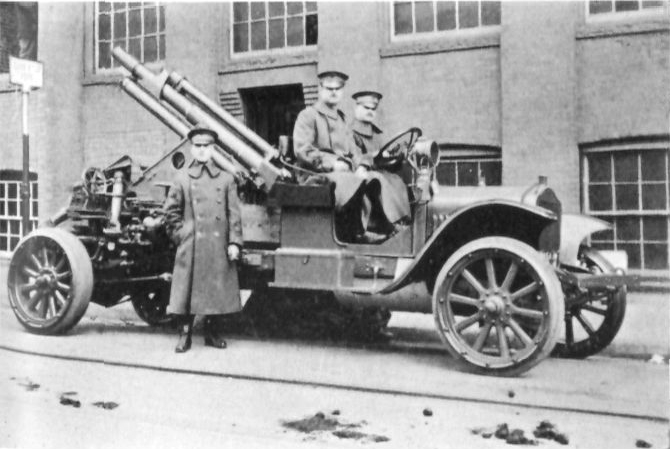
US 75mm Gun M1916 AA on White 2.5 ton Truck Mount

- D8 Gun, antiaircraft, 3-inch, M1917, M1917M1, M1917M2, gun, antiaircraft, 3 inch, M1918, M1918M1, parts and equipment. (3-inch gun M1917, 3-inch gun M1918)
- D9 Material, 3-inch, antiaircraft gun, M1917 (fixed)
- D10 3-inch, antiaircraft gun mount, M1918, 3-ton, antiaircraft gun trailer, M1918
- D11 Gun, and carriage 155 mm, M1917, M1918, M2, M3. (155 mm gun M1918)
- D12 Items common to 2 or more Group D materiel.
- D13 Items not authorized for general use
- D14 Tools for maintenance of antiaircraft artillery, heavy artillery
- D15
- D16 Material, 3-inch, antiaircraft gun, M3 (fixed) (3-inch anti-aircraft gun M3)
- D17 Material, 3-inch, antiaircraft gun M1A1, and M1A2 (mobile)
- D18 Gun, antiaircraft, 105 mm, M3. and mount M1
- D19 Gun, 155 mm, M1917 parts and equipment
- D20 Materiel, gun 6", Mk. XIX (British) - Parts and equipment (BL 6 inch Gun Mk XIX)
- D21 Materiel, gun, 7", Navy, for caterpillar mount - Parts and equipment also (7"/44 caliber gun)
- D22 Trailer, 3-ton, for 240mm howitzer M1918 - Parts and equipment
- D23 Material, 3-inch, antiaircraft gun, M2A2 (mobile)
- D24 Gun, 155 mm, M1, and M1A1. on Carriage M1. (155 mm Long Tom)
- D25 Gun, 155 mm, M1918, parts and material
- D26 Gun, 155 mm M1917A1, parts and equipment
- D27
- D28 Gun, 90 mm, M1, and M1A1. on mounts M1, and M1A1 (90 mm Gun M1/M2/M3)
- D29 Howitzer, 8-inch, M2. on Carriage M1. (M115 howitzer)
- D30 Gun, 155 mm, M1918MI. on Carriage M3
- D31 Howitzer, 240 mm, M1. on Carriage M1 (240 mm howitzer M1)
- D32 Gun, 120 mm, M1. on mount M1 120 mm M1 gun
- D33 Gun 8-inch, M1. on Carriage M2 (8 inch Gun M1)
- D34 Gun 90 mm, M1. and mount gun antiaircraft T2E1
- D35 Howitzer, 240 mm, M1918MI, and M1918MIA1. on Carriage M1918A2
- D36 Gun, 155 mm, M1918MI. on mount M4
- D37 Gun, 90 mm, M1. on mount M3 (90 mm Gun M1/M2/M3)
- D38 Gun, 90 mm, M2. on AA mount M2
- D39 Gun, 90 mm, M3. on mount M67
- D40 Gun, 90 mm, T8. on Carriage T5E2
- D41 Subcaliber device
  - S1
  - S2 Mount Subcaliber M10, (for 37mm)
  - S3
  - S4
  - S5 mount subcaliber, cal. .50 T-21
  - S6 Gun, 75 mm, M25, Subcaliber device.
  - S7 Mount subcaliber, cal. .50, M17
- D42 Gun, subcaliber, 37 mm, M14
- D43
- D44
- D45
- D46 Exerciser, recoil mechanism, M1
- D47 Mount, gun, combination, M73. for M46 & M46A1 tanks (M46 Patton)
- D48 Gun automatic, 75 mm T83E6, and E7. recoil mechanism, and loader ramer. (Skysweeper)
- D49 service parts, gun 155 mm, T80, (M46), howitzer 8-inch, T89, and mounts
- D50 Mount, howitzer, 155 mm, M80. (T167),
- D51 Howitzer 8-inch, T89 (M47)
- D52 Gun, 90 mm, M36, (T119E1). (M47 Patton)
- D53 Gun, 120 mm, T123E1, combination mount T154
- D54 Mount, gun, combination, M78, 90 mm.
- D55 Gun, 90 mm, T133, and carriage, T71
- D56 Gun, 165 mm, T156, (formerly gun demolition, 6.5-inch, British Mk. I.) (M728 Combat Engineer Vehicle)
- D57 Gun, 280 mm, T131, and carriage T72. (M65 Atomic Cannon)
- D58 Gun, 90 mm, M41, T139 (M48 Patton)
- D59 Gun, 90 mm, T125
- D60 Mount Gun combination, T148
- D61 Mount Gun combination, (7964488)
- D62 Mount Gun combination, T139
- D63 Howitzer, 155 mm, M45, T186E1. (M44 Self Propelled Howitzer)
- D64 Gun, 175 mm, T145
- D65 launcher, rocket, 762 mm, truck mounted, M289, Honest John, Launcher, rocket, self-propelled, T135
- D66 Trailer, 762 mm rocket, M329, and heating and tiedown kit M46. (Honest John)
- D67 Gun 175 mm, T181.
- D68 Mount 175 mm, T158
- D69
- D70

== Group "E" material ==
Artillery on barbette and railway carriages

- E1 Major items of railway and permanent and semi-permanent artillery
- E2 Gun, 3-inch, M1903. Barbette Carriage M1903, (3-inch gun M1903)
- E3 Guns, 5" - All models - Parts and equipment (5-inch gun M1900)
- E4 Gun, 6-inch, M1900. on Barbette Carriage M1900, (6-inch gun M1900)
- E5 Guns, 7" - All models - Parts and equipment (7"/44 caliber gun)
- E6 Gun, 8-inch, M1888MIA1. on Barbette Carriage M1918 on railway Carriage M1918MI (8-inch M1888)
- E7 Guns, 10" - all models - Parts and equipment. (10-inch gun M1895)
- E8 Gun, 12-inch, M1895MIA2. on Barbette Carriage M1917. (12-inch gun M1895)
- E9 Gun, 14-inch, M1920MII, MK. IV MI. and M1920MI. on Railway mount M1920. (14-inch M1920 railway gun)
- E10 Gun, 16-inch, M1919MII, and M1919MIII. on Barbette Carriage M1919 (16-inch gun M1919)
- E11 Gun and mount, saluting, 3", W.T. - Parts and equipment (3-inch Ordnance rifle)
- E12 Howitzer, 16", M1920 - Parts and equipment (16-inch howitzer M1920)
- E13 Mortars, 12" - All models, Parts and equipment (12-inch coast defense mortar)
- E14 Carriage, altered gun lift - Parts and equipment
- E15 Gun, 3-inch, M1903. Barbette Carriage M1903
- E16 Gun, 6-inch, M1900. on Barbette Carriage M1900
- E17 Gun, 8-inch, M1888MIA1. on Barbette Carriage M1918 on railway Carriage M1918MI
- E18 Carriages, barbette, 10" -all models - Parts and equipment
- E19 Gun, 12-inch, M1895MIA2. on Barbette Carriage M1917
- E20 Gun, 16-inch MK.II, M1. on Barbette Carriages M1919M1, M2, and M3 (16"/50 caliber Mark 2 gun)
- E21 Carriages, disappearing, 6" - all models - Parts and equipment (disappearing gun)
- E22 Carriages, disappearing, 8" L.F. - all models
- E23 Carriages, disappearing, 10", A.R.F. - all models - Parts and equipment
- E24 Carriages, disappearing, 10", L.F. - all models - Parts and equipment
- E25 Carriages, disappearing, 12", L.F. - all models - Parts and equipment
- E26 Carriages, disappearing, 14", L.F. - all models - Parts and equipment (14-inch gun M1910)
- E27 Carriages, disappearing, 16", L.F. - all models - Parts and equipment (16-inch gun M1895, 16-inch gun M1919)
- E28 Howitzer 16-inch, M1920. on Barbette Carriage M1920
- E29 Carriages, mortar, 12" - all models - Parts and equipment
- E30 Mount, pedestal, gun, 75mm, M1 - all models - Parts and equipment 75 mm gun M1916
- E31 Mount, railway, 7", Mk.II Mod. 3, Navy - Parts and equipment
- E32 Mount, railway, 12", M1918 - Parts and equipment
- E33 Gun, 14-inch, M1920MII, MK. IV MI. and M1920MI. on Railway mount M1920
- E34 Gun, 8-inch, MK. VI MOD. 3A2. Railway mount M1A1. (8 inch Mk. VI railway gun)
- E35 Mount, railway, sliding, 12" M1918 - Parts and equipment
- E36 Mounts, railway, 14" Navy - all models - Parts and equipment (14"/50 caliber railway gun)
- E37 Turret, 14", M1909 - Parts and equipment (Fort Drum (El Fraile Island), 14-inch gun M1909)
- E38 Cars, ammunition - all types - Parts and equipment
- E39 Car, construction, 14" Navy - Parts and equipment
- E40 Car, crane, 14" Navy - Parts and equipment
- E41 Cars, fire control - all models - Parts and equipment
- E42 Car, ground platform, M1918 (for 12" gun railway mount, M1918 - Parts and equipment)
- E43
- E44 Cars, railway - all models - Parts and equipment
- E45 Car, repair, M1918 - Parts and equipment
- E46 Car, sand and log, 14" Navy - Parts and equipment
- E47 Cars, shell and gun transport, narrow gauge - all types - Parts and equipment
- E48
- E49
- E50 Items common to 2 or more Group E materiel
- E51 subcaliber Devices
  - S1
  - S2
  - S3
  - S4
  - S5
  - S6 Gun subcaliber, 75 mm, M12, 75 mm gun M1916
- E52 Items not authorized for general issue
- E53 Car, Railway Machine shop, M1
- E54 Gun, 6-inch, M1903A2, and M1905A2. On Carriage Barbette, M1, and M2 6-inch gun M1903
- E55 Gun 8-inch, MK. VI, MOD. 3A2. on Barbette Carriage M1 8-inch Mk. VI railway gun
- E56
- E57 Organizational equipment, spare parts, tools, accessories, and supplies for controlled submarine mine materiel.
- E58 Gun, 16-inch, MK. II M1. on Barbette Carriages M4, and M5
- E59 Gun, 6-inch T2. on Barbette Carriages M3, and M4 6-inch gun M1
- E60
- E61 Power plant, M1 (for 16-inch gun batteries)
- E62 Power plant, M2 (for 12-inch gun batteries)
- E63 Power plant, M3 (for 8-inch gun batteries)
- E64 power plant, M4 (for 6-inch gun batteries)
- E65
- E66 Combined list of all parts and organizational, and base maintenance spare parts and equipment for release buoy M2, (controlled submarine mine material)

== Group "F" material ==
Fire control, and sighting material

- See: List of U.S. Army fire control and sighting material by supply catalog designation

== Group "G" material ==
Tank and automotive.

- See: List of U.S. military vehicles by supply catalog designation

== Group "H" material ==
Hardware

- H1 Standard Hardware
- H2 Miscellaneous hardware
- H3 Straps, leather findings, and piece leather.
- H4 Electrical fittings
- H5 Electrical Piece Material
- H6 Pipe and Hose Fittings
- H7 Pipe, Tubing, and Hose
- H8 Chains, locks, hasps, hinges.
- H9 Miscellaneous Piece Material (wire, rope, thread, duck, glass, etc.)
- H10 Ferrous Metals
- H11 Nonferrous Metals
- H12 Antifriction bearings, and related items
- H13 Oil Seals
- H14 Tires, Tubes, Tire Repair Material, and Related Items
- H15 Batteries
- H16 Lubricating Fittings, Oil Filters, and Oil Filter Elements
- H17 Brake Lining Kits, Curtains, Paulins, "V" Belts, and Miscellaneous Material
- H18
- H19
- H20 Miscellaneous Hardware, Wiring, and Assembling Kits

== Group "I" material ==
Unknown or unused

== Group "J" material ==
Common tools

- J1 Abrasion, and compression tools. (general abrasives, hand grinders, hand presses, sharpening stones, etc.)
- J2 Cutting, boring, and tweezer tools. (saws, shears, planes, files, rasps, chisels, bits, reamers (hand), pliers, pincers, etc.)
- J3 Geometrical tools and instruments.
- J4 Punch, drift, fastening, and scraping tools. (awls, needles, punches, drifts, screwdrivers, wrenches, scrapers, riveters, (hand sets), etc.)
- J5 lifting, holding, forming tools. (bit braces, saw frames, vises, clamps, hoists, block and tackle, molds for castings, anvils, jacks, and slings.)
- J6 Percussion, digging, and wrecking tools. (hammers, mallets, mauls, sledges, axes, hatchets, picks, mattocks, shovels, crowbars, pinch bars, etc.)
- J7 Welding, forging, soldering, and brazing equipment. (blow-torches, soldering coppers, melting ladles, and welding outfits).
- J8 Hand tool appurtenances. (file cleaners, handles, heads, tool checks, tool racks, etc.)
- J9 Measuring, and testing instruments. (electrical, air, liquid, etc.)
- J10 Small tools. (twist drills, countersinks, counterbores, cutting-off tool cutters, cutters etc.),(at least 9 sections)
- J11 Ammunition renovating tools.
- J12 Tools, Maintenance, for repair of group B materiel
- J13 Special tool sets for field artillery, and combat vehicle weapons
- J14 Paint, spraying equipment, and related items.
- J15 Benches, tool boxes, cabinets, bins, tool chests, tool rolls, etc. of general application.
- J16 Tire repair, and maintenance tools, and equipment. (J-16 contains at least 65 sections)
- J17 Common hand tools
- J18 special tools for special weapons
- J19 special tools for guided missiles
- J20 miscellaneous kits, and tool sets
- J21 Tool Set, Special, Explosive Ordnance Disposal Squad
- J22 special tools for sighting and fire control material, used with small?
- J23 special cannon bore inspection equipment
- J24 special tools for large caliber free flight rocket material. (group D)
- J25 tool set special, organizational maintenance, missile repair, Corporal XSSM-A-17.
- J26
- J27
- J28 Special Tool Sets, for special weapons,(group D)
- J29 Special Tool Sets, for guided missiles (group Y)
  - S1. Special Tool Sets, for Corporal guided missile materiel
  - S2. Special Tool Sets, for Nike guided missile materiel
- J30
- J31
- J32 Special Tool Sets for Sighting & Fire Control Materiel Used with Small Arms, Automatic Guns, Mortars, & Field Artillery
- J33 Tool Set, Field, Special, Ordnance Ballistic & Technical Service Team & Cannon Bore Inspection Equipment
- J34 Special Tool Sets for Large Caliber Free Flight Rocket Materiel
- (NOTE- after J-34 tools are listed individually, and number into the 700's)

== Group "K" material ==
Fluids, Gases, expendables

- K1 Cleaning, preserving, and lubricating materials, recoil fluids, special oils, and similar items of issue. (Paint included).
- K2 Soldering, brazing and welding materials, gases, and related items.
- K3 Lubricating equipment, accessories and related dispensers.
- K4 Oil filter elements

== Group "L" material ==
Target material

- L1 Targets, and Target equipment. small arms.
- L2 Major items of Group L.
- L3 Targets and target material, fixed armament, parts and equipment.
- L4 M3 field artillery trainer, (fires 1-inch steel balls. via compressed air).
- L5 Skeet and trap shooting equipment
- L6 discharger, smoke puff, parts and equipment
- L7
- L8
- L9 Target, fast moving ground, M2, parts and equipment.
- L10 projector target, rocket, M1
- L11
- L12 Board terrain, M1
- L13 Kit Training, Gunnery, M36.
- L14 target seacoast, M18
- L15 Target tow, Mk.22 A6B, and A7

== Group "M" material ==
Electrical apparatus and Miscellaneous

- M1 Electrical apparatus units and parts
- M2 Unassigned (1944 ORD2)
- M3 Miscellaneous accessory units and parts
- M4 Unassigned (1944 ORD2)
- M5 Component parts common to two or more groups.
- M6 Unassigned (1944 ORD2)
- M7 Unassigned (1944 ORD2)
- M8 Miscellaneous Chests, Kits, Racks, and tool rolls, cleaning materials, and small stores. (without contents)
- M9 Miscellaneous ordnance motor vehicle units and parts.
- M10 Unassigned (1944 ORD2)

== Group "N" material ==
Tool sets

- N1 Maneuvering material and supplies.
- N2
- N3
- N4
- N5
- N6
- N7 Ordnance medium tank company.
- N8 Tools and supplies for ordnance light maintenance company.
- N9 Measuring, impression, testing, and reconditioning outfits.
- N10 Surveillance, demolition, testing, equipment.
- N11 General tools and supplies, ordnance depot company
- N12 General tools and supplies, ordnance ammunition company
- N13
- N14
- N16
- N17 General tools, and supplies, for ordnance ammunition company.
- N18 Tool set, armorers, tank destroyer battalion.
- N19 Tool sets, motor transport Basic.
- N20 Tool set Armorers, field artillery Battalion.
- N21 Ordnance maintenance sets.
- N22
- N23 Tool-set, unit equipment, special for posts camps, and stations.
- N24
- N25
- N30 Tool-sets, for ordnance service command automotive shops.

== Group "O" material ==
Unknown or unused

== Group "P" material ==
Ammunition for heavy artillery

- P1 Projectiles, separate loading, 6-inch to 240 mm inclusive
- P2 Charges, propelling, separate loading, 6-inch to 240 mm inclusive for harbor defense, heavy field, and railway artillery.
- P3 Projectiles, separate loading, 10-inch to 16-inch inclusive, for harbor defense, heavy field, and railway artillery. including complete round data.
- P4 Charges, propelling, separate loading, 10-inch to 16-inch inclusive, for harbor defense, heavy field, and railway artillery.
- P5 Ammunition for antiaircraft artillery
- P6 Ammunition, fixed, including subcaliber ammunition, for harbor defense, heavy field, and railway artillery
- P7 Fuzes, Primers, Blank ammunition, and miscellaneous items for antiaircraft, harbor defense, heavy field, and railway artillery
- P8 Ammunition instruction material, for antiaircraft, harbor defense, heavy field, and railway artillery
- P9 Ammunition, obsolete and nonstandard for harbor defense, heavy field and railway artillery.
- P10 Packing materials used by field service for antiaircraft, harbor defense, heavy field, and railway artillery service ammunition
- P11 Special Ammunition Surveillance, Testing, Inspection, and Renovation: Tools and Supplies

== Group "Q" material ==
Special weapons material

- Q1 Major items and major combinations of

== Group "R" material ==
Ammunition for pack, light, and medium field artillery

- R1 Ammunition, fixed and semifixed, all types, including subcaliber for pack, light, and medium field artillery including complete round
- R2 Projectiles, and propelling charges, separate loading, for medium field artillery including complete round data.
- R3 Service fuzes and primers for pack, light, and medium field artillery
- R4 Ammunition, trench mortar, including fuzes, propelling charges and other components
- R5 Ammunition, blank, for Pack, Light, and Medium field artillery
- R6 Ammunition instruction material for pack, light, and medium field artillery
- R7 Land Mines and Fuzes, Demolition Material, and Ammunition for Simulated Artillery and Grenade Fire
- R8 Ammunition complete and nonstandard
- R9
- R10 Packing materials used by field service

== Group "S" material ==
Bombs, grenades, pyrotechnics

- S1 Bombs, aircraft, all types
- S2 Fuzes and miscellaneous explosive components for aircraft bombs
- S3 Fin assemblies, and miscellaneous inert components for aircraft bombs
- S4 Grenades, hand and rifle, and fuzing components
- S5 Pyrotechnics, military, all types
- S6 Ammunition instruction material for grenades, pyrotechnics, and aircraft bombs
- S7 Guided missile complete rounds, all types
- S8 Guided missile explosive components, all types
- S9 Rockets, all types, and components
- S10 Obsolete and nonstandard bombs, grenades, pyrotechnics, and rockets.
- S11 Materials for renovating and packaging of Group S ammunition and miscellaneous items

== Group "T" material ==
Small arms ammunition

- T1 Ammunition for Rifle, Carbine, and Automatic gun.
- T2 Ammunition for revolver, automatic pistol, and submachine gun.
- T3 Shells for shotgun
- T4 Miscellaneous service components of small arms ammunition, and instruction material for field service account.
- T5 Shipping and packaging containers and materials, including such items as Bandoleers, Belts, Clips, Links, and odds and ends for small arms ammunition.
- T6 Ammunition, small arms, obsolete and nonstandard.

== Group "U" material ==
Army Aircraft

- U1 Major items of
- U2 Aircraft, 2 place, fixed wing L-19A (Cessna), Cessna O-1 Bird Dog
- U3 Aircraft, 2 place, fixed wing L-21A (Piper), Piper PA-18 Super Cub
- U4 Aircraft, multi passenger, fixed wing L-17A,-B,-C, (Ryan), Ryan Navion
- U5 Aircraft, multi passenger, fixed wing L-20 (DeHaviland), de Havilland Canada DHC-2 Beaver
- U6 Aircraft, multi passenger, fixed wing LC-126B (Cessna)
- U7 Aircraft, helicopter, utility, H-13B, C, D, E, (Bell), Bell H-13 Sioux
- U8 Aircraft, helicopter, utility, H-23, B, (Hiller), Hiller OH-23 Raven
- U9 Aircraft, helicopter, cargo transport, H-19A, B, (Sikorsky), Sikorsky H-19 Chickasaw
- U10 Aircraft, helicopter, cargo transport H-21B, (Piasecki), Piasecki H-21
- U11 Aircraft, helicopter, cargo transport H-25A, (Piasecki), Piasecki HUP Retriever
- U12 Aircraft, multi passenger, twin engine, multi passenger, L-23, Beechcraft L-23 Seminole
- U13 Aircraft, target, OQ-19D

== Group "V" material ==
(unused or unknown)

== Group "W" material ==
(unused or unknown)

== Group "X" material ==
(unused or unknown)

== Group "Y" material ==
Guided Missiles, guidance and control, launching, transporting, and handling material. (as well as radio-controlled aerial targets)

- Y1 S-1 Major items, and major combinations pertaining to guided missile material
- Y1 S-2 Major items, and major combinations pertaining to aerial target material
- Y2 Body, guided missile, M2
- Y3 Missile guided, Corporal, XSSM-A-17. (MGM-5 Corporal)
- Y4
- Y5 Launcher loader, guided missile, M26. and rack M5. (Nike (rocket))
- Y6 Launcher control station M307. and launching central control, M3
- Y7 Control indicator, CO-1448/MSE-2
- Y8 Simulator group, OA-758/MSE-2
- Y9 Rack battery charging M6. (Nike Ajax)
- Y10 motor generator set, 400-cycle, (8003148)
- Y11 Truck bracket hand, jato, M254, and missile M256. (Nike Ajax)
- Y12 Truck bracket hand, guidance section, M255. (Nike Ajax)
- Y13 Rail launching, and handling, XM1
- Y14 Truck lift hand, missile, M257. (Nike Ajax)
- Y15 shop set, assembly, and test. (special)
- Y16 Carriage missile handling, XM28
- Y17 Servicer, acid M2, and fuel M3, guided missile
- Y18 test set launching area, portable electrical equipment, XM20
- Y19 test set, electrical equipment, guided missile, XM22
- Y20 tester missile hydraulic, XM14
- Y21 Draining kit, oxidizer, guided missile, M53
- Y22 Cable system fire control, M26, and launching M27
- Y23
- Y24
- Y25
- Y26 Tracking Station Group OS-1595/MPA-5;Missile Tracking Antenna-Receiver-Transmitter Group OA-1485/MPA; and Target Tracking Antenna-Receiver-Transmitter Group OA-1488/MPA: Addition of Waveguide Switch and Dummy Load (Nike Hercules Antiaircraft Guided Missile System) (U)
- Y27
- Y28 Director-Computer Group OA-1479/MSA-19: Burst Time Change (Nike Hercules Anti-Aircraft Guided Missile System) (U)
- Y29
- Y30
- Y31
- Y32 Target aerial, OQ-19B, and OQ-19D (Quail)
- Y33 Launcher, rotary, aerial target, A-2
- Y34 Catapult, aerial target, rocket powered, A-7
- Y35 Starter, external electric, J-5
- Y36 Cart universal starter, model RPES-3A
- Y37 Test box equipment, aerial target
- Y38 stand universal, model HS-2, and cradle target handling
- Y39 Tracking Station Group OA-1595/MPA-5: Bore-sight Drift Reduction, Gain Control Increase, and System Reliability Improvement (Nike-Hercules Antiaircraft Guided Missile System)
- Y40
- Y41
- Y42
- Y43
- Y44
- Y45
- Y46
- Y47
- Y48
- Y49 Draining kit, fuel, guided missile, M54
- Y50 Radar set group, semitrailer mounted, OA-652/MPO-25. (Corporal II)
- Y51 Computer group, guided missile, trailer mounted, AN/MSA-6. (Corporal II)
- Y52 Radio set, AN/MRQ-7, (Corporal II)
- Y53 Control center, missile battery, AN/GTW-1. (Corporal II)
- Y54 Selector, launcher control, AN/GSW-3. (Corporal II)
- Y55 Firing station, guided missile, truck mounted, AN/MSM-1. (Corporal II)
- Y56 Missile test station, truck mounted, AN/MSM-4. (Corporal II)
- Y57
- Y58 Antenna group, trailer mounted, OA-651/MPQ-25. (Corporal II)
- Y59 Tracker optical, M3, (Corporal II)
- Y60 Interconnecting group, cable, OA-771/G. (Corporal II)
- Y61 Erector, guided missile, self-propelled M2. (Corporal II)
- Y62 Trailer, warhead, guided missile, 4-wheel, M311. (Corporal II)
- Y63 Air servicer, truck mounted, 5-ton 6x6, M350. (Corporal II)
- Y64 Truck propellent servicing, 5-ton, 6x6, M268E1, (Corporal II)
- Y65 Tank, acid, premetered, M1. (Corporal II)
- Y66 Tank, Aniline, premetered, M2. (Corporal II)
- Y67 Servicing platform, truck mounted, 5-ton, 6x6, M280E1. (Corporal II)
- Y68 Launcher, guided missile, M27. (Corporal II)
- Y69 Rack set, guided missile, M16, (Corporal II)
- Y70 Control selector, type-C-1267/URW-6
- Y71 Semitrailer, van, tracking station, M323. (Corporal II)
- Y72
- Y73
- Y74
- Y75
- Y76
- Y77
- Y78
- Y79
- Y80
- Y92 Group Y Field and Depot Maintenance Allowance for Radar Course Directing Central Common Items List Consisting of: Antenna and Mast Group; Antenna-Receiver-Transmitter Group, Acquisition; Antenna-Receiver-Transmitter Group, Missile Tracking; Antenna-Receiver-Transmitter Group, Target Tracking; Director-Computer Group; Electronic Shop, Trailer Mounted, M304; Tracking Station Group; Test Set, Radar TS-847A/MSW-1 (Nike-Hercules Antiaircraft Guided Missile System)
- Y100 Field change kits for surface-to-surface guided missile systems
- Y101 Field change kits for surface-to-air guided missile systems

== Group "Z" material ==
Captured Foreign material

- Z1 Major items and major combinations of German material
- Z2 Major items and major combinations of Japanese material
- Z3 German ammunition all types
- Z4 Japanese ammunition all types

== See also ==
- Ammunition Identification Code
- NATO Stock Number
- United States Military Standard
- List of individual weapons of the U.S. armed forces
- List of World War II weapons of the United States
- List of World War II artillery
- Rock Island Arsenal
- PS, The Preventive Maintenance Monthly
- Table of Organization and Equipment
- United States Army Ordnance Training and Heritage Center

== References, general ==
- Ordnance Publications For Supply Index (OPSI) (pdf). Washington: War Department, Ordnance Office. 1 July 1943. "Introduction to The Ordnance Catalog, Index of Standard Nomenclature Lists, Ordnance Provision System Regulations, Schedules of Stores Reports, Ordnance Storage and Shipment Charts, and Alphabetical Listing of Major Items"
- ORD 1, (dated Feb. 1955)
- ORD 12 SNL OGS 1 Obsolete Major Items of Group A (17 Jul 1945)
- TM 9-1900 Ammunition general dated 1945
- mm-Aircraft-Guns-1943 TM 9-2200 small arms, Mortars, antiaircraft guns.
- TM 9-2300 Standard Artillery and Fire Control Material. dated 1944
- TM 9-2300 Artillery Materiel and Associated Equipment. dated May 1949
- Army Vehicle Identification Numbers by Dennis Spence, ISBN 0-938242-10-5
- "The Ordnance Department : procurement and supply"
- Monthly catalog of United States Government publications #582, July 1943, 1705 pages (listed under War Department)
- Nike Missiles Manuals Collection, 1951-1987 (archived) (in Group Y – GOGA 35286, Golden Gate National Recreation Area)
