= M1901 =

M1901 may refer to:

- Steyr Mannlicher M1901 pistol
- Winchester M1901 shotgun
- M1901 disappearing carriage, designation of the US Board of Fortifications
- F28 Sight M1901 variant, see List of U.S. Army fire control and sighting material by supply catalog designation
- Ehrhardt 7.5 cm Model 1901, Artillery used by the Norwegian Army
