= M1904 =

M1904 may refer to:

- 6-inch siege gun M1904, Imperial Russian artillery gun
- 76-mm mountain gun M1904, see List of mountain artillery
- M1904 model of the Maxim gun
- M1904 or Winchester Model 1904 rifle, see List of Winchester models
- M1904 carbine, variant of the Krag–Jørgensen bolt-action rifle
- M1904 saddle, variant of the McClellan saddle
- F119 Telescope Panoramic variant M1904, see List of the United States Army fire control and sighting material by supply catalog designation
- F135 Mount Telescope variants M1904A1 and M1904A1M1, see List of the United States Army fire control and sighting material by supply catalog designation
