= Saint-Chamond-Mondragón =

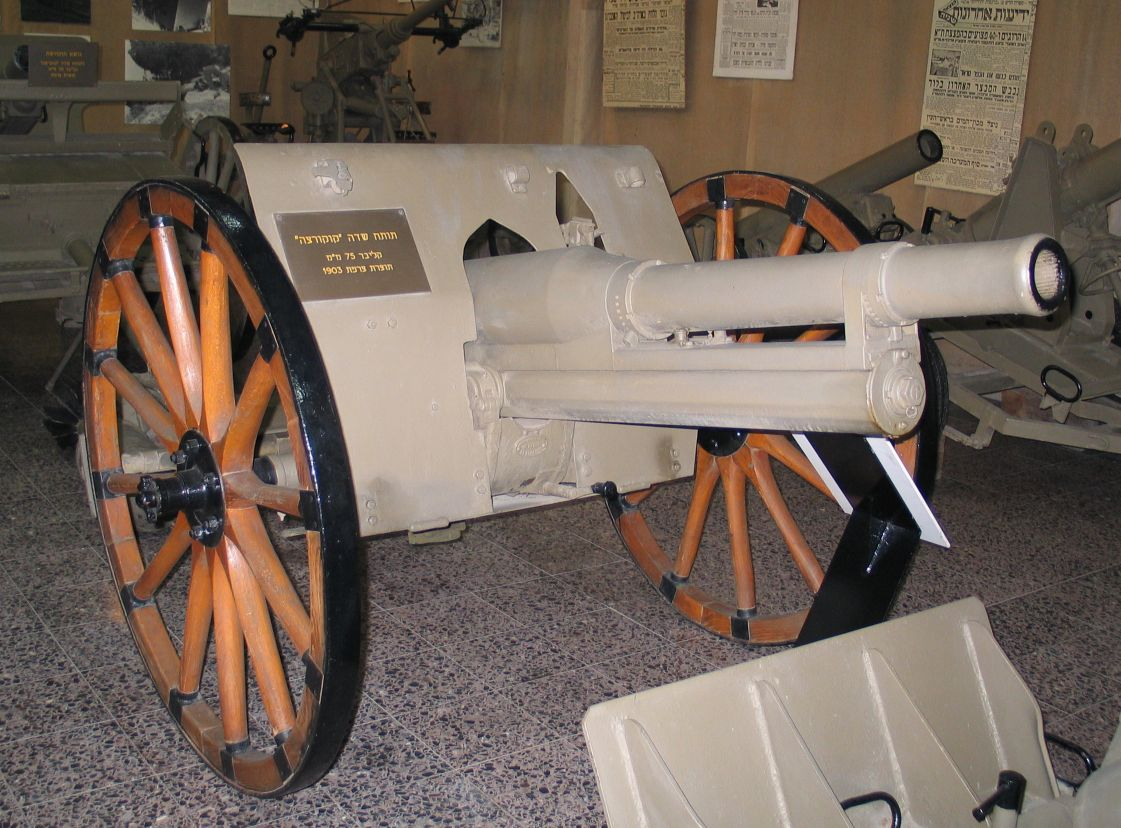
- Saint-Chamond 75 mm gun in the IDF History Museum.
- Type: Field gun
- Place of origin: Mexico

Service history
- In service: 1900-?

Production history
- Designer: Manuel Mondragón
- Manufacturer: Saint-Chamond

Specifications
- Mass: Firing: 1,090 kg (2,400 lb); Travel: 1,770 kg (3,900 lb) with limber
- Barrel length: 2.25 m (7 ft 5 in) L/28.5
- Shell: Fixed QF 75 x 253 mm R
- Shell weight: 7.2 kg (16 lb) Shrapnel; 5.32 kg (11.7 lb) High explosive
- Caliber: 75 mm (3 in)
- Breech: Interrupted screw
- Carriage: Box trail
- Elevation: -8° to +17°
- Traverse: 5° L/R
- Muzzle velocity: 550 m/s (1,800 ft/s)
- Effective firing range: 6,500 m (7,100 yd)

The Canon de 75 modèle 1915 Saint-Chamond also known as the Canon de Tir Rapide 75 mm St Chamond or the Saint-Chamond-Mondragón was specified in the 1890s by Mexican General Manuel Mondragón, designed mostly by Colonel Émile Rimailho, and produced by the French arms manufacturer Saint-Chamond. It was widely used by different forces during the Mexican Revolution. It was also used in modified form to arm some of the French Saint-Chamond tanks deployed during the First World War.

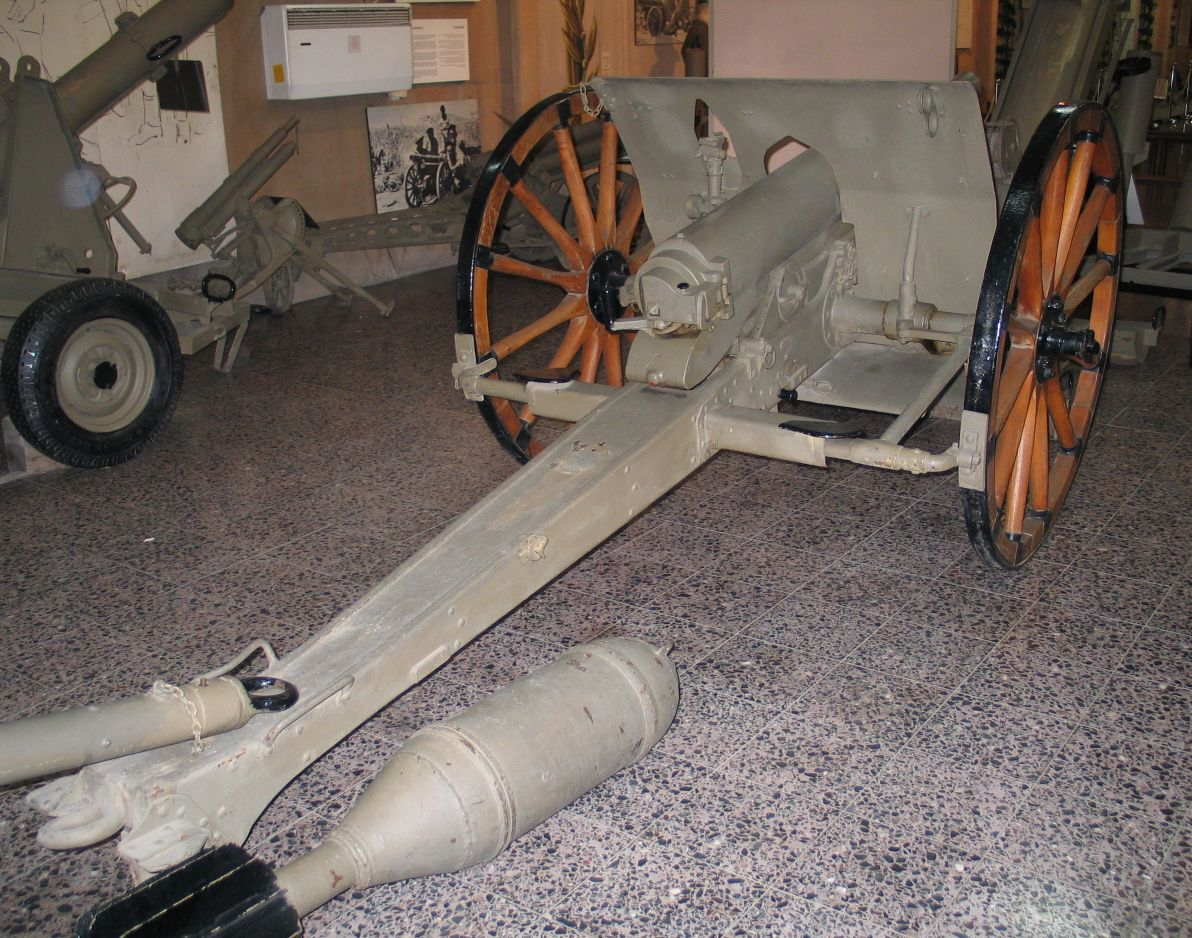
Rear view

Israel purchased a number of pieces from Mexico in 1948 and used them in the 1948 Arab–Israeli War. Because of its Mexican origin, the gun was known in Israel as Cucaracha. Three surviving pieces are on display in Israeli museums: two in the Israel Defense Forces History Museum in Tel Aviv, and one in Beyt ha-Gdudim museum in moshav Avihayil.
