= List of the United States Army fire control and sighting material by supply catalog designation =

This is a list of United States Army fire control, and sighting material by supply catalog designation, or Standard Nomenclature List (SNL) group "F". The United States Army Ordnance Corps Supply Catalog used an alpha-numeric nomenclature system from about the mid-1920s to about 1958. These designations represent parts catalogs for supply and repair purposes. There can be numerous volumes, changes, and updates under each designation

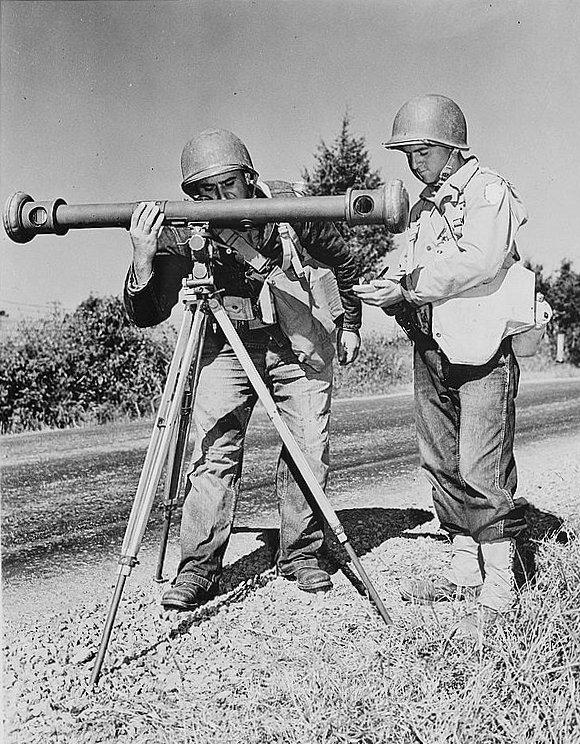
American soldiers using a Coincidence rangefinder with its distinctive single eyepiece during Army maneuvers in the 1940s.

== F1 to F99 ==
- F1 Major items, small arms, automatic gun, trench mortar, and field artillery sighting equipment, and fire control instruments
- F2 Major items, harbor defense, railway, and antiaircraft artillery sighting equipment, and fire-control instruments
- F3 Items not authorized for general issue
- F4 Rule, slide, M1917 – Parts and equipment
- F5 Items common to two or more group F products
- F6 Aiming Circle, M1918 (French)
- F7 Instrument angle of sight, M1917
- F8 Mount, telescope, M1 (for 37mm gun carriage, M1); Telescope, M2 (for 37mm gun carriage, M1) – Parts and equipment
- F9 Telescope B.C. M1915, and M1915A1
- F10 bore sight, (small arms, and field artillery)
- F11 Setter Fuze, Bracket, M1916, M1916A1, M1916A2
- F12 Targets, testing (small arms and field artillery) – parts
- F13 Gunners Quadrant, M1918.
- F14 Compass, lensatic, M1918 – Parts and equipment, 16 September 1927
- F15 Machine gun clinometer M1917 Parts and equipment
- F16 Sight, panoramic, machine gun, M1918 – Parts and equipment
- F17 Device, aiming, mirror, M1918 – Parts and equipment, 23 November 1926
- F18 Night lighting device, parts and equipment
- F19 Board, deflection, M1
- F20
- F21 Kit, repair optical, for field artillery equipment
- F22 Telescope, Pan
1. oramic, M1917M1 (Mils)
- F23 Compass, Prismatic, M1918
- F24 Sight Quadrant, M1918A1
- F25 Range finder, 80-cm. base, M1914; Range finder, 80-cm. base, M1916; Range finder, 80-cm. base, M1917; Range finder, 80-cm. base, M1918 -Parts and equipment, 7 December 1926
- F26 Finder range, 1-meter base,
- F27 Sights, rocking-bar (all types) – Parts and equipment
- F28 Sight, M1901 (French)
- F29 Sight, M1916, for 75 mm Gun M1916 – Parts and equipment
- F30 Sight, telescopic, 2.24-inch (6 Pdr.) tank gun, Mk.II (British) -Parts and equipment
- F31 Sight, M1916, telescopic, 37mm gun, M1916 – Parts and equipment, 18 October 1926
- F32 Sight Telescopic, M1918, M1918A2. (for 37-mm tank gun, and machine gun,) (M2 Light Tank?)
- F33 Quadrant sight, M1916, for 37-mm Gun M1916
- F34 Glass field, type EE. 6-power
- F35 Post aiming, M1
- F36 Pocket watch, 7-Jewel, 15-Jewel, and stop watch Type B, class 15. and Wrist watch.
- F37 Clinometer, MK.1, (degrees) 3-inch, trench mortar
- F38 Telescope, B. C. M1917B1, M1917B2, M1917B3, M1917B4
- F39 Finder range,80-cm, base, M1918
- F40 Level, testing – Parts and equipment
- F41 Periscope, Battery Commanders, M1918
- F42 Mount, telescope, M2 (for 75mm mortar carriage, M1); Telescope, elbow, M3 (for 75mm mortar carriage, M1) – Parts and equipment
- F43 Sight, M1912, 2.95-inch mountain gun – Parts and equipment
- F44 Altimeter, M1917, M1920. ?
- F45 Depression position finder, Lewis, M1907 – Parts and equipment
- F46 Finder depression position (Swasey type AII) (Depression position finder)
- F47 Periscope, rifle, M1918 – Parts
- F48 Board rocket, M1918. (for signal rockets)
- F49 Telescope, sighting, No. 4, Mk. III (British); Telescope, sighting, No.5, (British) – Parts and equipment
- F50 Sight, M1917, for A.A. carriages (for 75m A.A. truck mount, M1917) – Parts and equipment
- F51 System, sighting, A.A. M1 (for 3" A.A. gun mounts, M1917MI) – Parts and equipment
- F52 Trainer coincidence, Type A
- F53
- F54
- F55
- F56 Indicator, wind component, M1
- F57 Rule set forward, type B
- F58 Instrument Observation M1. Telescope, M3?
- F59 Board plotting and relocating, cloke, M1923. (Plotting board)
- F60 Altimeters
- F61
- F62
- F63
- F64
- F65
- F66
- F67
- F68
- F69 Firing tables, and trajectory charts
- F70 Trainer Coincidence, type B
- F71
- F72
- F73
- F74 Eyeglasses, amber, M2. and eyeglasses, red M1.
- F75 Board deflection Gun, M1905, M1905MI, M1917
- F76 Board, deflection, mortar, M1906
- F80
- F81 Board, range correction, M1, and M1A1
- F82
- F83
- F84 Instrument, Azimuth M1910A1, M2 (degrees)
- F85
- F86 Mount, Telescope, M9, M13
- F87 Quadrant Elevation, M1917
- F88
- F89
- F90 Telescope, Panoramic, M1918MIII (Mils)
- F91
- F92 Telescope, Observation, M1908
- F93 Kit repair optical, for harbor defense
- F94
- F95 Predictor, Mine, M1916
- F96
- F97
- F98 Clinometer, M1912, and M1912A1
- F99

== 100 to 199 ==
- F100 Board plotting and relocating, M1
- F101 Tripods, all types
- F102 Board, plotting, 110-degree, M1915, and M1918
- F103 Corrector, percentage, M1
- F104
- F105
- F106 Mount, Telescope, M3, and Telescope, Panoramic, M1
- F107 Circle aiming, M1916, M1916MI
- F108 Rule Aiming, M1918 with sights
- F109
- F110
- F111 Finder depression position, M1, M2
- F112 Mount Telescope, M7
- F113
- F114
- F115
- F116 Board, fire adjustment M1
- F117
- F118 System data transmission, for director M1, M2
- F119 Telescope, Panoramic, M1904, M1915
- F120 Material, Sound locator, (T), parts and Equipment
- F121 Instrument Binaural training, M1, parts and equipment
- F122 Telescope, M1923
- F123 Telescope, Panoramic, M1922
- F124
- F125
- F126 Setter Fuze, hand, M1912, and M1912A4
- F127 Setter Fuze, hand, M1913A1
- F133 Mount, Telescope, M1906, and M1906A1, and Telescope, (2-inch) M1906, M1909
- F134
- F135 Mount Telescope, M1904A1, and M1904MIA1
- F136
- F137 Telescope, (3-inch) M1912
- F138 Mount, Telescope, M1912M1, M1918
- F139 Board spotting M2
- F140 Quadrant Gunners, M1 (Mils)
- F141
- F142 Mount Telescope, M4
- F143
- F144
- F145
- F146 Glass field type-E. 6-power, and glass field type-EE, (Navy)
- F147 Compass, prismatic, M1918, (Keuffel and Esser type)

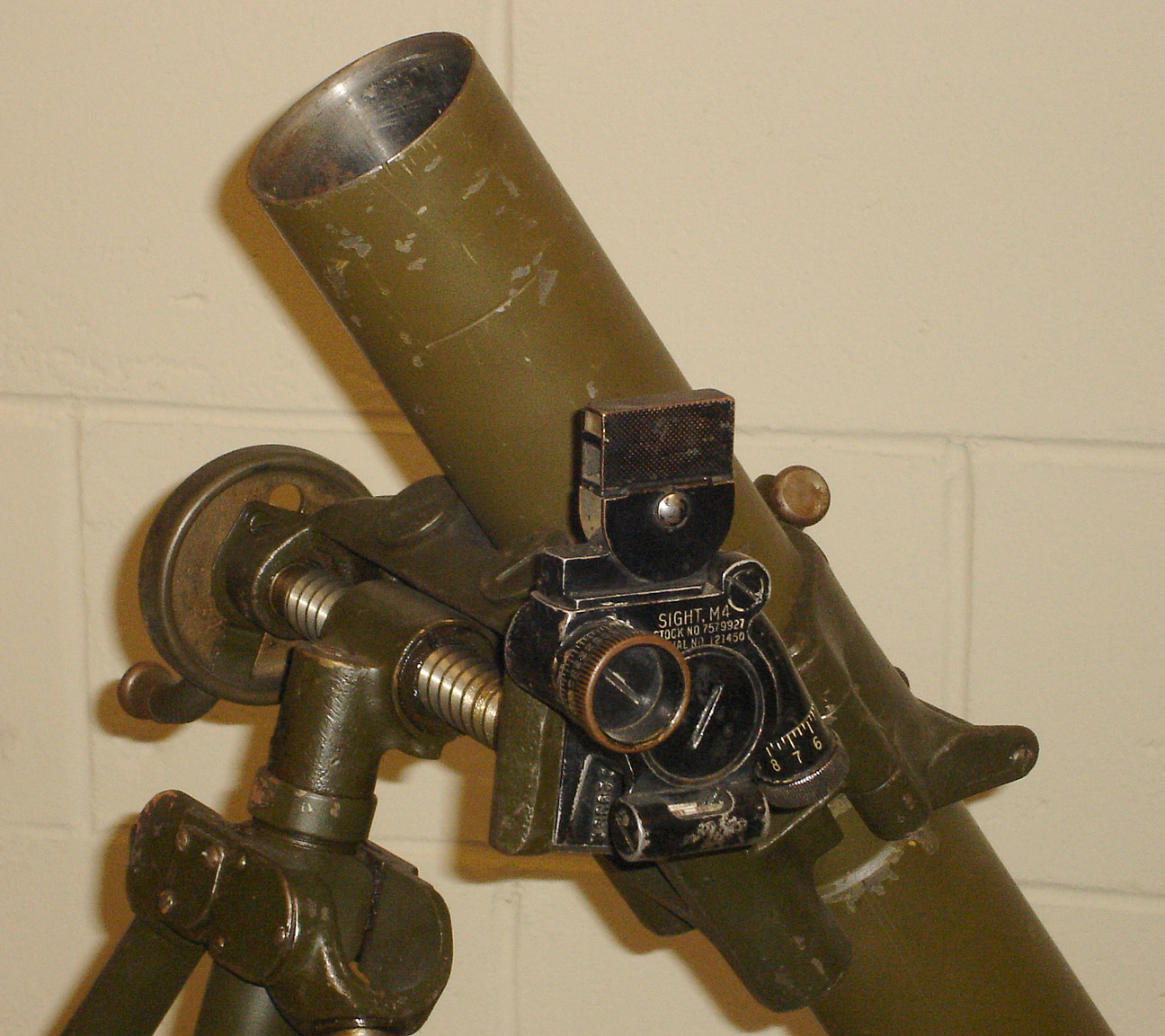
M4 Collimator Sight, used for both indirect fire and direct lay missions.

- F149 Instrument, Azimuth, M1918, M1918A2, M1 (Mils)
- F150
- F151
- F152 Arms scale M1906
- F153 Corrector, wind, sound ranging, M1
- F154 Board plotting, sound ranging, M1
- F155
- F156 Mount, Telescope, M6A1
- F157
- F158
- F159
- F160 Aiming circle, M1
- F161
- F162
- F163
- F164 Finder, range, stereoscopic, 6-meter base, M2
- F165 Lamp, Aiming post,
- F166 Mount Telescope, M15A1 and Quadrant range M1
- F167 Director (Military), AA., M7, M7A1B1, M7A1B2
- F168 Tester, Stereoscopic, M1A1
- F169 Mount Telescope, M16
- F170
- F171 Finder height, M1, M1A1
- F172 Telescope, 2-inch, M1909A1
- F173 Telescope, Observation, M48, M49
- F174 Telescope, M5, M5A1, (machine gun)
- F175
- F176 Material sound Locator, M2
- F177 Setter Fuze, M8
- F178 System data transmission, M3
- F179
- F180 Mount Quadrant, M1
- F181 System data transmission, M4A1
- F182
- F183 Telescope, M64, M74
- F184 Mount Telescope, M19 and Telescope, M6 (37 mm Gun M3)
- F185 Board Plotting, M3, and M4
- F186 Mount Telescope, M20
- F187 Pocket watch, Railroad grade.
- F188 Instrument flank spotting, M1. and Rule flank spotting, M1
- F189 Finder Height, M2, and M2A1
- F190 System, Data Transmission, M5, M7, M8, M9, M10, M13, M14, M17
- F191 Post Aiming, M4, M5, M6, M7, M8, M9
- F192
- F193 Trainer Stereoscopic, M2, M3 and M6, M7
- F194 Clock, message center, M1
- F195 Sight Telescopic, M1
- F196 Telescope, Panoramic, M8
- F197 Mount Telescope, M21 M23?
- F198 Instrument Binaural training, M2, parts and equipment
- F199 Mount Telescope, M22

== 200 to 299 ==
- F200 Kit, cable repair, M1, M2, M3, M5, and M7
- F201 Board spotting, M3, and M7?
- F202 Voltage controller, M1
- F203 Gun Data Computer, M1
- F204 Quadrant, Elevation, M1
- F205 Light Instrument, M2, M5, M9, M10, M12, M13, M16, M17, M18, M19, M23, M25, M26, M27, M28, M29, M30, M31, M32, M33
- F206 Kit, Instrument repair
- F207 System remote control, M2, and cable, M1
- F208 System remote control, M1, M5, and cable, M8
- F209 Director (Military), AA., M5, M5A1, and M5A2
- F210 Binocular, M3, M8, M9, M13
- F211 Setter Fuze, M13
- F212
- F213 Instrument Azimuth, M1918A1
- F214 Telescope, Panoramic, M12, M12A1, A2, A3, A5
- F215 Rule Slide M1
- F216 Mount Telescope, M25
- F217 Periscope, M1, with M21 telescope.
- F218
- F219 Compass, M2
- F220 Light, Aiming post, M14
- F221 Setter Fuze, M10
- F222 System, Data Transmission, M6
- F223 Mount Telescope, M30
- F224 Mount Telescope, M26, M27, M28 M47? M52C, M52D, M54
- F225 System remote control, M3, M4, and cable M9
- F226 Directors Trailer, M13 M14. and generator trailer, M7
- F227 generating unit, M5, M6
- F230 Mount Telescope, M24A1, and Telescope M18. (Ordnance QF 6 pounder)
- F231 Telescope elbow, M1, M1A1, M6, M17, M22, M34, and M58
- F232
- F233 Board plotting, M5 (for flash ranging)
- F234 Mount Telescope, M35, and Telescope, M31
- F235 Periscopes, telescopes for periscopes, and direct sighting telescopes for use in tanks.
  - V1 Periscope, M4A1 with Telescope, M47A2
  - V2 Periscope, M6
  - V3 Periscope, M8A1, with Telescope, M39A2 for howitzer motor carriage M8 also M9 periscope
  - V4 Periscope, M10C, M10D, M10F, M10G, M10P
  - V5 Periscope, M13, B1, M14, A1, M17
  - V6 Periscopes, M15, and M15A1
  - V7 Periscopes, M16C, M16D, M16F, M16G, M16H
  - V8 Telescope, M69C, M69F, and M69G
  - V9 Telescope, M70C, M70D, M70F, M70R
  - V10 Telescope, M71C, M71D, M71G, M71K, M71N
  - V11 Telescope, M76C, M76F, M76G
  - V12 Telescope, M83C, M83D, M83F
  - V13 Telescope, M86F
  - V14 Telescope, M79E1
  - V15 Periscope, M20, -A1, A2, A3, and A3C (for M41, M47, M48 series tanks)
  - V16 Telescope M97
  - V17 Periscope M19, and T41, night vision for M60 tank
  - V18 Periscope, T25, T36
  - V19 Periscope T38
- F236 Mount Telescope, M36. and Telescope M33
- F237 Table, Firing, Graphical M1 thru M20, M22, M38 to M51
- F238 Binocular, M2, M7, M14, M15, M16, M17, Mark 21 (Navy)
- F239
- F240
- F241 System Sighting, M5, M6
- F242 Mount, sight, M35, and sight reflex M18 (Quadmount)
- F243 Director (Military), M9, M9B1, and M10
- F244 System cable, M3
- F245 Setter Fuze, M14 (wrench), M15, M16, M17, M21
- F246 Instrument spotting, M2
- F247
- F248
- F249 Kit, Helium filling, M8 (for height finders)
- F250 Trainer, Director, M8
- F251 Arms scale, M1906
- F252 System Sighting, M7
- F253 Mount Telescope, M43
- F254 Finder range, M7, M9, M9A1
- F255
- F256 Mount Telescope, M42
- F257
- F258 Transmitter azimuth, M5, and elevation M6
- F259 Telescope, B.C. M65
- F260
- F261 Mount Telescope, M50
- F262 Telescope elbow, M62, M62E2, M62A1C
- F263 Mount Telescope, M40
- F264 Binocular, M6
- F265
- F266
- F267
- F268 Binocular, M5
- F269
- F270
- F271 Mount Telescope, M44
- F272 Kit, instrument repair
- F273 Gun Data Computer, M8C, M8F, M8G, M8K, M8N, M9
- F274 Amplifier, torque M1
- F275 Observation tower, M1
- F276 Sight Computing, M7, M7A1
- F277 System Remote control, M14
- F278
- F279 Clock tank, 8-day Elgin
- F280
- F281 Quadrant Elevation, M9
- F282
- F283 Generating unit, M15, M15A1
- F284 Indicator, Powder Temperature, M12, M13, M14, M15
- F285 Indicator Azimuth, M18, M19
- F286 Sight, correctional, Mk. V (Navy) (40MM Gun)
- F287 Indicator, Range, MK. 1. (Navy)
- F288 Setter Fuze, M19. (120 mm M1 gun)
- F289 Telescope, M73B1, M81, M82, M84
- F290 Generating unit M17
- F291 Generating unit, M18
- F292 Mount Telescope, M45
- F293 Setter Fuze, M22, M23
- F294 Mount Telescope, M55 (T85). M56, M57, M70, M77
- F295 Mount Telescope, M64, (T90), M72
- F296 Mount Telescope, M65, (T94), M82
- F297
- F298 Finder range, M10
- F299

== 300 to 399 ==
- F300 Mount telescope T89
- F301 Mount Telescope, M59, M79,
- F302
- F203
- F304 Mount Telescope, M63,
- F305
- F306
- F307 Sight computing, M14
- F308 Sight computing, T80
- F309 Board plotting, M9C, M9D, M9F
- F310 Mount Telescope, M78, and Telescope, M85C
- F311 Mount Telescope, M69
- F312 Mount Telescope, M66, M67, M68 M73, M83, and (T116)
- F313
- F314 Board plotting, M10
- F315 System remote control, M16E1 for twin 40-MM ON M42 CHASSIS
- F316 Sight computing, M13
- F317
- F318
- F319 Interpupillometer, M1
- F320 Mount, sight, M74
- F321 Sight computing, M19
- F322 Holder telescope mount, M4
- F323 Mount Telescope, M79
- F324 Adapter, telescope, M9
- F325
- F326 Periscope, M18, M18C
- F327 Telescope, T151, T151E1
- F328
- F329 Table Graphical, firing, M39, M39A1, M40, M40A1, M41, M1A1, M42, M43 thru M57
- F330
- F331
- F332
- F233
- F334
- F335
- F336
- F337
- F338
- F339
- F340
- F341
- F342 Fire control system AA. M33C, M33D
- F343 Telescope, M91C, T152
- F344 Mount telescope, M87, T173, M87A1
- F345 Setter fuze, orientation, M24
- F346 Thermometer, powder temperature, M1, M1A1
- F347
- F348
- F349 Setter Fuze, M26
- F350 Fire control system, T38
- F351 Table, graphical site, M52, M52, M54, M55, M56
- F352 Telescope, M90C, (T127E3) M90D
- F353 Mount, telescope, M85, T158
- F354 Mount sight, M86
- F355 Azimuth indicator T23
- F356 Finder range, T46E1
- F357 Setter Fuze, M27
- F358 Mount Periscope, M88, M89, M93, (T176E1), and M94
- F359 Drives Ballistic, M4, M3, and T23E2
- F360 Quadrant, elevation, M13, T21
- F361 Sight, T149E2
- F362 Sight, bore, T150
- F263 Sight, computing, T154
- F364 Mount, telescope, M92, T178, T178E1
- F365 Transmitter, superelevation, M22, T13
- F366 Sight unit, M34, M34A1, M34A2
- F367 System, cable, M23
- F368 System projection, (7597856)
- F369 Inverter, (7633698)
- F370 Sight ring assembly (F7686524)
- F371 Mount Telescope, M96,
- F372 Mount Telescope, T179
- F273 Telescope, Panoramic, T149E1
- F374 Telescope, M101
- F375 Mount, telescope, M31 M32
- F376 Mount Telescope, M71
- F377 Drive, range, T25
- F378 Mounts Periscope, M102, and M102A1
- F379 Circle, aiming, M2, (T3)
- F380 Mount Telescope, T-169E1
- F381 Mount Telescope, M101
- F382 Telescope, M93 T153
- F283 Mount Telescope, T-159
- F384 Sight Periscope, M25
- F385 Mount Telescope, T191
- F386 Computer Ballistic, T31
- F387 Device, leveling, 8293768 for 106-MM Recoilless Rifle M40
- F388 Mount, periscope, T195
- F389 Indicator Azimuth, M20, m21, M27, M28, M30, M31
- F390 Fuze setter, M28
- F391 Telescope, elbow, M92D
- F392 Mount Telescope M90
- F293 Sight, bore, M37
- F394
- F395 sight, M39, T156
- F396 Periscope mount, M105, T185
- F397
- F398
- F399

== 400 to 499 ==
- F400
- F401 Ballistic Drive, M5A1, (T24E5) for M48A2 (M48 Patton)
- F402 Periscope, M28, (T46), 1956
- F403
- F404
- F405

== See also ==
- List of U.S. Army weapons by supply catalog designation
- Indirect fire
- Gun laying
- Coincidence rangefinder
- Sound ranging
- Coast Artillery fire control system
- Angular mil
