= 75 mm gun M1917 =

1917 American field gun

75 mm gun model of 1917
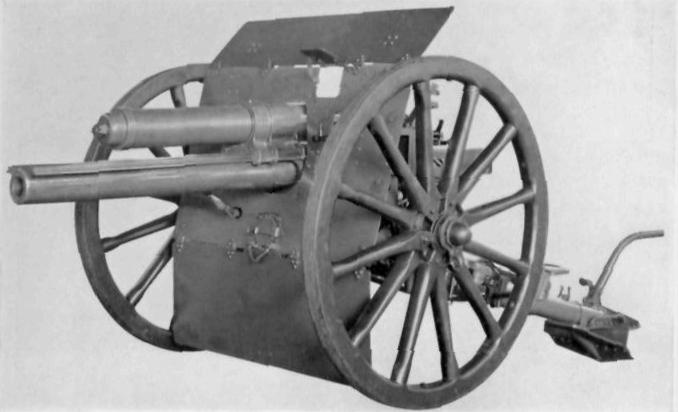
- Type: Field gun
- Place of origin: United States

Service history
- In service: 1918–1945
- Used by: United States; United Kingdom; Finland; Greece; Philippine Commonwealth
- Wars: World War II; Continuation War

Production history
- Designed: 1917
- Produced: 1917

Specifications
- Mass: Gun & Breech: 995 lb (451 kg); Total: 2,890 lb (1,310 kg)
- Barrel length: Bore: 7 ft (2.1 m) L/28; Total: 7 ft 4 in (2.24 m)
- Shell: Fixed QF 75 x 350mm R
- Shell weight: 16 lb (7.3 kg) (Shrapnel); 12.3 lb (5.6 kg) (HE)
- Calibre: 75 mm (2.95 in)
- Recoil: hydro-spring 45–49 inches
- Carriage: wheeled, pole trail
- Muzzle velocity: 1,693 ft/s (516 m/s) (Shrapnel); 1,900 ft/s (580 m/s) (HE)
- Effective firing range: 6,494 yd (5,938 m) (Shrapnel); 8,100 yd (7,400 m) (HE short fuze); 7,450 yd (6,810 m) (HE long fuze)

The 75 mm gun model of 1917 was an interim measure, based on the British QF 18-pounder, produced by the United States in World War I after it had decided to switch from 3-inch (76 mm) to 75 mm calibre for its field guns.

== History ==
The US decided early in World War I to switch from 3-inch (76 mm) to 75 mm calibre for its field guns. Its preferred gun for re-equipment was the French 75 mm Model of 1897, but early attempts to produce it in the US using US commercial mass-production techniques failed, partly due to delays in obtaining necessary French plans, and then their being incomplete or inaccurate, and partly because US industry was not equipped to work to metric measurements. By 1917 US firms had produced 851 QF 18-pounders for export to Britain. Hence production of a 75 mm version offered a simple interim solution, being basically a copy of the British QF 18-pounder rechambered for French 75 mm ammunition, utilizing existing production capacity. It remains very similar to the 18-pounder, the main visible difference being a shorter barrel with straight muzzle.

The gun was developed too late to see action in World War I.

== Between World Wars ==
Although World War I had shown that direct fire, light field guns like the M1917 lacked adequate firepower to destroy an entrenched enemy, the majority of combatants had large numbers of them and had little impetus to replace them. With a limited peacetime budget, the US Army like other armies opted to modernize its artillery by switching from horse traction to motor traction.

In January, 1934, field conversion kits were collected at the Rock Island Arsenal and 48 were sent to Hawaii and 24 were sent to the Philippines. The kits included the same sprung axles, steel wheels, and pneumatic tires as the 75 mm M1897A4 that allow them to be towed at higher speeds. Of the 900 M1917s available roughly half were modernized to M1917A1 standards.

== World War II ==
=== British service ===
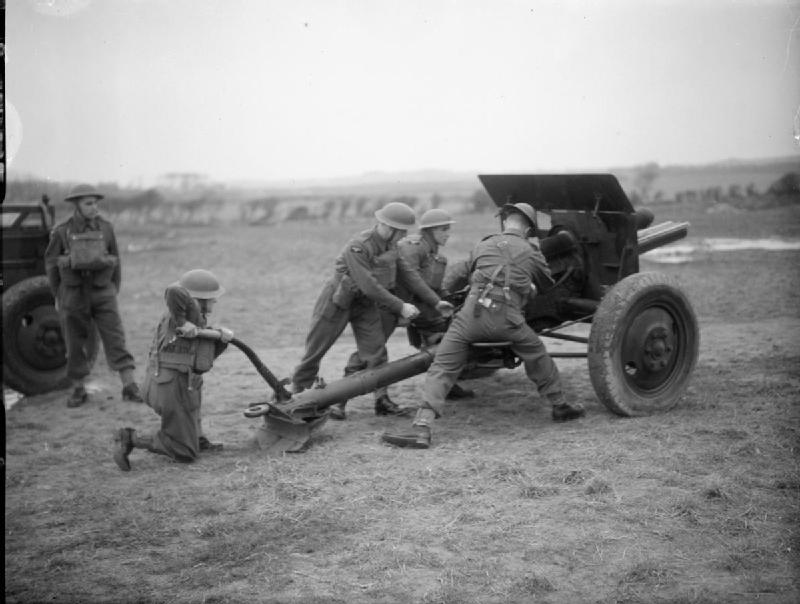
British airmen man a 75 mm field gun during training at No. 2 RAF Regiment School, Whitley Bay, Northumberland, during World War II

Early in World War II Britain lost many of its field guns in France, and the US transferred 395 M1917s to Britain, where its similarity to the 18-pounder made it useful for British home defence and training needs. Its British designation was the Ordnance QF 75mm on Carriage, 75mm /18 pr Mark 1PA.

=== Canadian Service ===
At least 2 guns were mounted onboard the Canadian Number 1 Armored Train on the west coast from 1942 to 1943, one mounted at the front, and one at the rear.

=== Finnish service ===
Finland purchased 200 old guns from the United States for its Winter War against the USSR in 1940. They arrived too late to be used in that war but were designated "75 K/17" and after necessary overhaul were used in the Continuation War from 1941, and many continued in use for training until the 1990s.

=== Greek service ===
The gun entered in Greek service during the Greco-Italian war of 1940–1941. Greece requested aid from the US and Britain, which in part came in the form of the British 75 mm field gun. A total of 24 by the US in March and 50 by Britain in January 1941 were offered. Of those, 24 were sent from Britain, but only 18 arrived in January 1941 to Greece. The rest of the offered guns were either sunk or never loaded on ships due to the fall of Greece in April 1941. The 18 that arrived to Greece were in need of maintenance before being pressed into service. Ultimately 4 guns saw service with the 19th Field Artillery Battalion, and 12 guns with the B3 Field Artillery Battalion.

=== United States and Philippine service ===
174 M1917s were sent to the US and Philippine Army and participated in the Philippines Campaign where all were lost. Another 48 were still at sea and diverted to Java and served in the Java Campaign where they were lost.

== Surviving examples ==
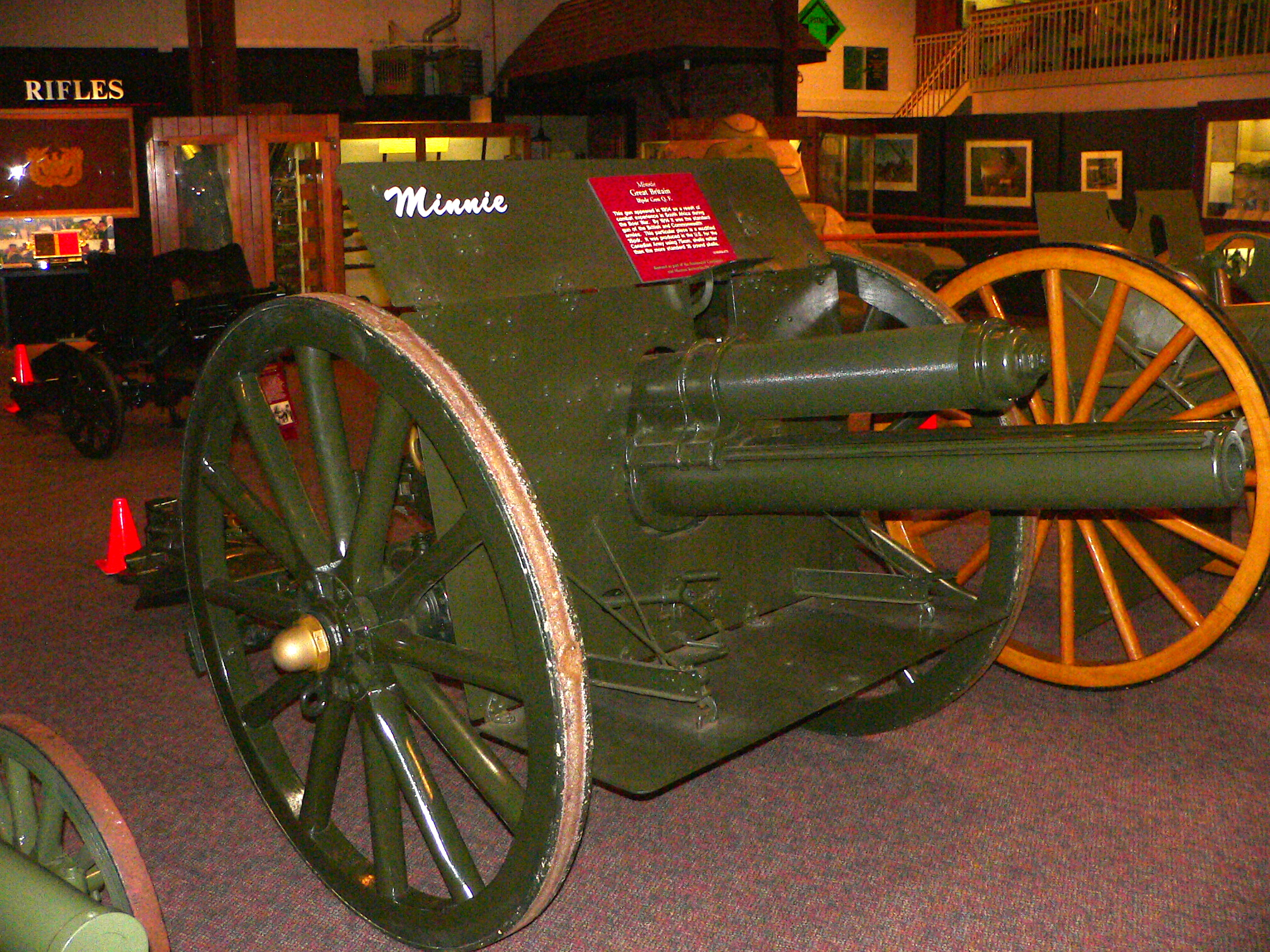
"Minnie" at United States Army Ordnance Museum, Maryland

- "Minnie" is displayed at the United States Army Ordnance Museum, Maryland
- Imperial War Museum, Duxford, England
- The Central Museum of The Royal Regiment of Canadian Artillery, CFB Shilo, Manitoba, Canada
- US Army Artillery Museum, Ft Sill, Oklahoma, USA
- The Artillery Museum of Finland, Linnankasarmi, Hämeenlinna, Finland

== See also ==
- United States home front during World War I
- Ordnance QF 18 pounder
- List of field guns

== Bibliography ==
- "Handbook of Artillery". US Ordnance Department. Document No. 2033. July 1921
- Sevellon Brown, The Story of Ordnance in the World War. Washington: James William Bryan Press, 1920
- Herbert T Wade, United States Army Ordnance Dept, "Handbook of ordnance data". Washington, Government Printing Office, 1919
