= MiniTSFO =

Mini TSFO
- MiniTSFO Classic Target Screen
- Developer: Captain Bill Erwin
- Stable release: 1.7 / 1987
- Operating system: DOS
- Type: Simulation
- License: Public domain

The Mini TSFO (Training Set, Fire Observation) was the first artillery call-for-fire simulation designed for the personal computer. It was started in 1985 as an outgrowth of a Field Artillery Officer Advanced Course battlefield research project at the U.S. Army Field Artillery School (USAFAS) to develop a concept for incorporating PCs into artillery training, and was completed in 1986. It replaced summer artillery live fire training for cadets at West Point in 1986 and 1987.

One of the USAFAS students involved in the battlefield research project, Captain (later Colonel) Bill Erwin, volunteered to continue to develop the concept into an actual application during his follow-on assignment to the USAFAS Directorate of Training and Doctrine.

Versions:

MINITSFO - Original version using a Digital Message Device (DMD), virtual map, and CGA graphics.

VTSFO - Replaced the DMD with keyboard interface for use at West Point.

NGFTSFO - Naval Gunfire version using EGA graphics, actual scenes from San Clemente Island training area, and incorporating effects of dispersion between rounds.

== Evolution of a military video game ==
As originally envisioned, the MiniTSFO would be a complete system that required only a computer to play. This meant that there had to be some way to see targets on-screen, some way to locate the target coordinates such as a map, and some way to call for fire. This resulted in a combination of three screens which the user could flip back-and-forth by using function keys. The first screen showed a simulated view through an AN/GVS-5 laser rangefinder. The map screen was a depiction of the fictional German town of Nitzburg and surrounding area. Lastly, the way to enter firing commands was a virtual AN/PSG-2 Digital Message Device (DMD).

The virtual DMD required extensive programming in order to simulate the actual operation of a real DMD and consumed most of the program code space.

The MiniTSFO was originally coded in BASICA, an interpreted version of BASIC available on IBM PCs. As the design of the program was pushing the limits of BASICA, Microsoft introduced the QuickBASIC compiler. This allowed the MiniTSFO to grow beyond the memory limits of BASICA and structured programming allowed additional complexity.

In its initial design, the MiniTSFO drew all screens from program code. It wasn't long before the limitations of this approach became obvious and so the screens completed to date were captured and imported into PC Paintbrush to be edited. This allowed the additional of details that would have been too tedious to incorporate through code and also allowed the target screens to be easily edited to add additional types of targets.

To allow the target screens to be easily changed to provide additional challenges, the target locations and descriptions were read in from an initialization file when the MiniTSFO was started.

== MiniTSFO (classic edition) ==
MiniTSFO Classic map screen

MiniTSFO Classic DMD screen

The MiniTSFO used a virtual DMD to control fire missions. The user was presented with one of five random target screens. The user would then determine how to engage the target by either grid location, polar coordinates, or shifting from a known point by flipping back and forth between the target screen and the map. Once the target was located, the user would go to the virtual DMD and enter a fire mission just as a real FO would do with a real DMD. Messages back and forth between the user and the fire direction center (shot and splash) would precede the depiction of an artillery round bursting where the user had described the target location. The user would then use the virtual DMD to adjust the fire onto the target, fire for effect, and then give end-of-mission details. After the end of the fire mission, the user would be critiqued on several factors such as initial target location, description, how many rounds were needed to fire-for-effect, and overall mission completion.

The best available graphic card for a PC at that time was the CGA which allowed for 320x200 resolution in only four colors. This meant that the graphics for the MiniTSFO, while state-of-the-art for the time, would be considered very crude by today's standards.

== Trainer edition ==
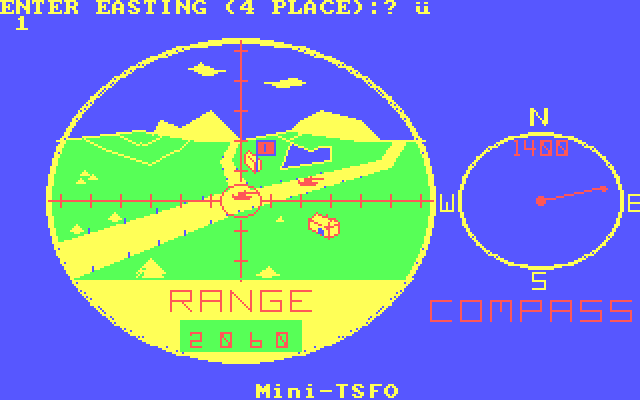
Entering Target Easting for the Trainer Edition

This was the classic edition with the DMD removed and a keyboard interface used instead. NCOs training cadets at West Point decided that teaching them to use a DMD was too time-consuming, and wanted them to just call the fire mission information to the NCO in charge, who would then enter it into the MiniTSFO. This was the only difference from the classic edition.

== Naval gunfire edition ==
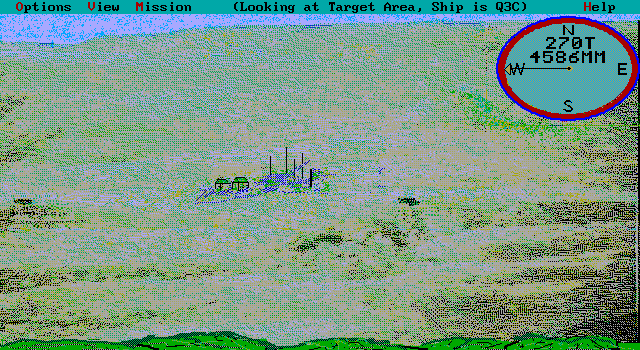
Zoomed-out view of target area

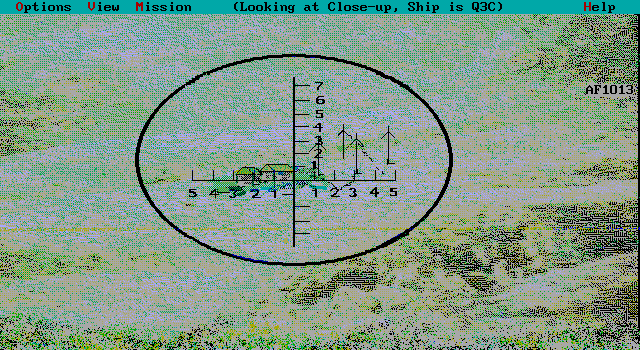
Zoomed-in view of target area

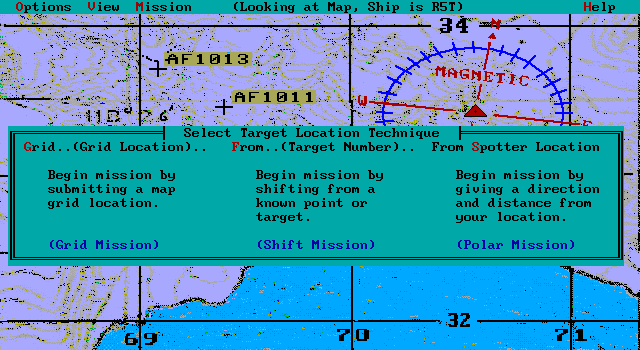
Target Engagement Method

In 1987, the Joint Munitions Effectiveness Group became concerned that existing simulations such as the TSFO gave an unrealistic picture of effects on a target because the effect of dispersion between rounds was not taken into account. In other words, if you fired 10 rounds at a target, not all the rounds would hit in the same spot. Most would hit close to the target and a couple might be quite a distance away in a pattern along the gun-to-target line. This can be computed using a Gaussian distribution function.

Efforts to include this effect in the TSFO were deemed too expensive and lengthy. One of the members of the group was familiar with the MiniTSFO and suggested that it be modified. Additionally, since the original MiniTSFO supported the Army call for fire process, it was deemed appropriate to have the new version support the Naval Gunfire (NGF) process.

Work began immediately. By this time, the Extended Graphics Adapter (EGA) was commonly available for the PC offering 640/350 resolution and a palette of 16 colors. Photographs of the San Clemente Island impact area were scanned in, incorporated into PC Paintbrush for cleanup, and realistic targets added. An actual map of the area was also scanned in, providing additional realism.

The virtual DMD was replaced by a fire mission workup board, as was used by Naval Gunfire Liaison Officers. Once the target was located, the user would flip to the workup board, enter the mission information, and submit to the ship.

Communications back and forth were through a scrolling strip of text at the bottom of the screen. The actual transmissions that would be used in a real naval gunfire mission kept the user informed on the progress of the mission.

Besides the enhanced graphics and dispersion, several additional enhancements were made. The ship's location would move during the conduct of the fire mission and the user would see the pattern of rounds on the ground move along with the ship as its direction to the target shifted. The initialization file listed the direction, speed, and weapon type for each available firing platform. Also, the effects on the target would be judged on how close the rounds actually came to the target based on the caliber of the weapon.

== Unfinished work ==
MiniTSFO for Windows virtual DMD

Virtual DMD connection options

Development of expansion cards for PCs which allowed communication with the TACFIRE system raised the possibility of using an actual DMD to replace the virtual DMD in the MiniTSFO and also of using the MiniTSFO's virtual DMD to communicate with a real TACFIRE system.

Unfortunately, the original developer had moved to a new assignment at the Pentagon as a Systems Automation Officer. This led to two problems: Nobody at the Field Artillery School stepped up to develop any follow-on systems nor did any external agency offer to provide funding to secure a contractor to continue development.

== The MiniTSFO's legacy ==
For several years, the Field Artillery School used the MiniTSFO as an example of the school's leadership in adopting computer technology. An overview of the MiniTSFO was briefed to all pre-command classes for Field Artillery battalion and brigade commanders as well as visiting dignitaries. It also provided some inspiration for the developers of the Guardfist II, a much more capable system. Some artillerymen used it to keep their skills up (the director of the USAFAS Gunnery Department used it before meeting with lieutenants in basic artillery training so that he could impress them with his skills with a DMD). In retrospect, it was a good introduction to what was to come later.

== MiniTSFO Training Aids ==
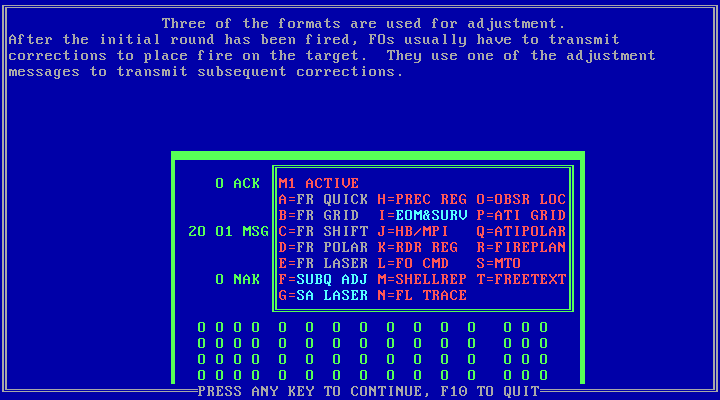
MiniTSFO Message Type computer assisted training

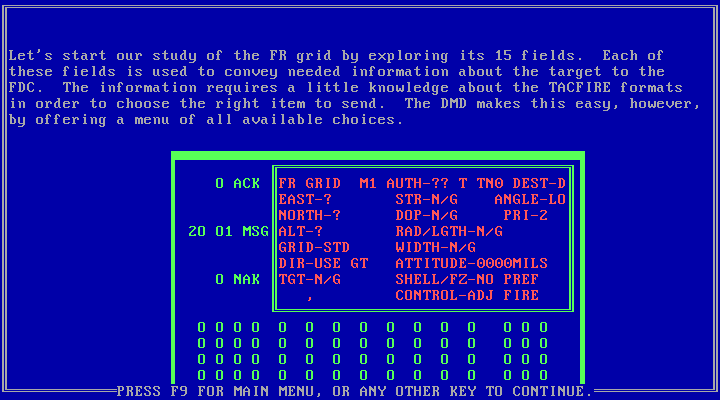
MiniTSFO Fire Request-Grid computer assisted training

Three text-mode training applications were also developed to demonstrate how microcomputers could assist in training real-world situations. These are the Message Types, Fire Request-Grid, and Fire Request-Polar applications.

Each offers many screens of training material and then allows the student to practice with a text-mode representation of a PSG-2 Digital Message Device. The text-based DMD simulated the actual operation of a real DMD and allowed for the use of text-only microcomputers as many early Army computers were not purchased with graphics capability.
