= Mark 8 Fire Control Computer =

The Mark 8 Fire Control Computer was developed by Bell Laboratories during World War II. It was initially requested by the USN Bureau of Ordnance as an alternative to the Ford Instruments Mark I Fire Control Computer, in case supplies of the Mk I were interrupted or were unable to be manufactured in the required numbers. The Mk 8 computer used all electric methods of computation, in contrast to the Mk 1, which performed most computations via mechanical devices. The Mk 8 was found to be more accurate than the Mk 1 and substantially faster in reaching a fire control solution, but by the time it was developed and tested in 1944, supplies of the Mk 1 were found to be sufficient in quantity. The USN extensively tested the Mk 8 and may have incorporated some of its technology into the post war Ford Instruments Mk1A computer. The Mk 8 technology was similar to that used in the M9 gun data computer used by the US Army for coast defence fire control and in the SCR-584 radar system computer.
