= AN/GYK-12 =

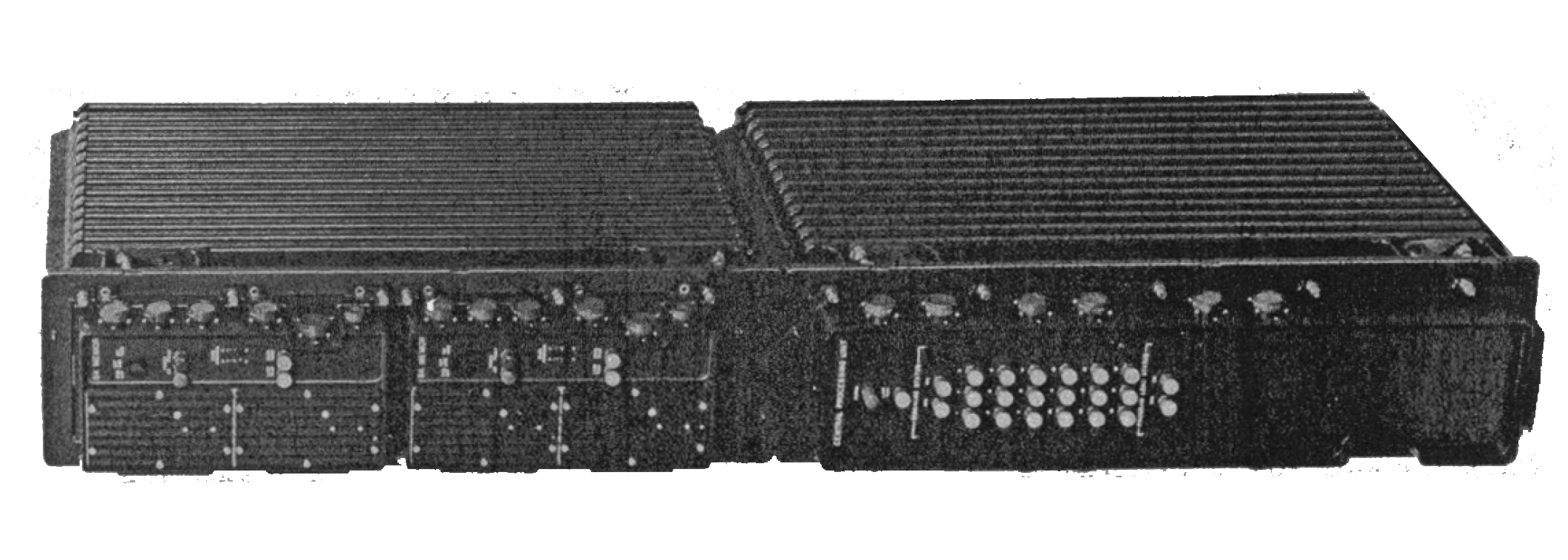
AN/GYK-12 CPU

The AN/GYK-12 is an obsolete 32-bit minicomputer developed by Litton Industries for the United States Army. The AN/GYK-12 is a militarized version of the L-3050 computer ruggedized for use in the TACFIRE tactical fire direction system and in the TOS^{2} (Tactical Operating System, Operable Segment) system which was never fielded. The design dates from the 1960s.

In 1980, the Army introduced the Nebula instruction set architecture (MIL-STD-1862), intended as an upgrade to the AN/GYK-12. Nebula is also a 32-bit architecture with 32-bit addressing mode and instructions optimized for running programs written in Ada.

In accordance with the Joint Electronics Type Designation System (JETDS), the "AN/GYK-12" designation represents the 12th design of an Army-Navy electronic device for ground data processing computing equipment. The JETDS system also now is used to name all Department of Defense electronic systems.

== Description ==
The basic system consists of three rack-mounted modules: The CPU, the IOU (Input/Output unit), and the MCMU. Modules are mounted vertically and are 9.32 inches (23.7 cm) wide by 33.75 inches (85.7 cm) high.

The AN/GYK-12 has a 32-bit instruction format and operates on data from one bit to a doubleword (64 bits) in size. Only fixed-point binary arithmetic is provided.

The system can have a maximum of 32768 pages—64 million words—of 2 μs memory (256 MB). Physically memory is divided into banks of 8 KW to minimize memory contention. Logically it is divided into pages of 2 KW each. Access to pages is controlled by 16 Page Control and Address Registers per program level, allowing an individual program to directly address 128 KB at one time.

The AN/GYK-12 CPU features 64 hardware priority program levels, numbered from 0 (highest) to 63 (lowest). One task can run at each level. Level 0 is reserved for "power off". Level 1 is power-on restart. Level 2 handles hardware and program errors. Level 63 is entered after completion of a boot load. Therefore the system can support a maximum of 60 user tasks. Tasks are scheduled preemptively—a task will run until an error occurs, until it gives up control to another task, or until successful completion of an input/output operation transfers control to the so-called normal program level.

Each task also has a privilege level, which controls the operations it is allowed to perform. Level '00'b is used for non-privileged programs. Level '01'b programs are semi-privileged. Level '10'b programs are privileged and can execute all instructions and I/O operations. Level '11'b is unused.

The system uses Sylvania Universal High Level II Integrated Circuits (SUHL II), manufactured by Collins Radio, Honeywell, Raytheon and Motorola Semi-Conductor Division.

== See also ==
- Gun data computer
- List of military electronics of the United States
