= Mark I Fire Control Computer =

Component of the Mark 37 Gun Fire Control System

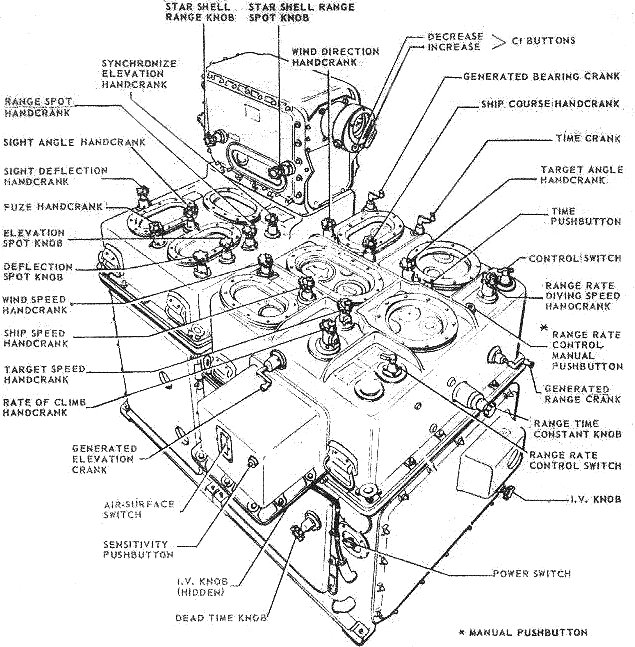
Mark 1A Computer

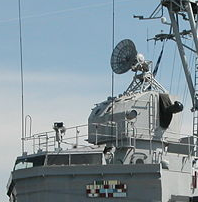
Mk 37 Director above the bridge of destroyer USS Cassin Young with AN/SPG-25 radar antenna

The Mark 1, and later the Mark 1A, Fire Control Computer was a component of the Mark 37 Gun Fire Control System deployed by the United States Navy during World War II and up to 1991 and possibly later. It was originally developed by Hannibal C. Ford of the Ford Instrument Company and William Newell. It was used on a variety of ships, ranging from destroyers (one per ship) to battleships (four per ship). The Mark 37 system used tachymetric target motion prediction to compute a fire control solution. It contained a target simulator which was updated by further target tracking until it matched.

Weighing more than 3,000 pounds (1,400 kg), the Mark 1 itself was installed in the plotting room, a watertight compartment that was located deep inside the ship's hull to provide as much protection against battle damage as possible.

Essentially an electromechanical analog computer, the Mark 1 was electrically linked to the gun mounts and the Mark 37 gun director, the latter mounted as high on the superstructure as possible to afford maximum visual and radar range. The gun director was equipped with both optical and radar range finding, and was able to rotate on a small barbette-like structure. Using the range finders and telescopes for bearing and elevation, the director was able to produce a continuously varying set of outputs, referred to as line-of-sight (LOS) data, that were electrically relayed to the Mark 1 via synchro motors. The LOS data provided the target's present range, bearing, and in the case of aerial targets, altitude. Additional inputs to the Mark 1A were continuously generated from the stable element, a gyroscopic device that reacted to the roll and pitch of the ship, the pitometer log, which measured the ship's speed through the water, and an anemometer, which provided wind speed and direction. The Stable Element would now be called a vertical gyro.

In "Plot" (the plotting room), a team of sailors stood around the four-foot-tall (1.2 m) Mark 1 and continuously monitored its operation. They would also be responsible for calculating and entering the average muzzle velocity of the projectiles to be fired before action started. This calculation was based on the type of propellant to be used and its temperature, the projectile type and weight, and the number of rounds fired through the guns to date.

Given these inputs, the Mark 1 automatically computed the lead angles to the future position of the target at the end of the projectile's time of flight, adding in corrections for gravity, relative wind, the magnus effect of the spinning projectile, and parallax, the latter compensation necessary because the guns themselves were widely displaced along the length of the ship. Lead angles and corrections were added to the LOS data to generate the line-of-fire (LOF) data. The LOF data, bearing and elevation, as well as the projectile's fuze time, was sent to the mounts by synchro motors, whose motion actuated hydraulic servos with excellent dynamic accuracy to aim the guns.

Once the system was "locked" on the target, it produced a continuous fire control solution. While these fire control systems greatly improved the long-range accuracy of ship-to-ship and ship-to-shore gunfire, especially on heavy cruisers and battleships, it was in the anti-aircraft warfare mode that the Mark 1 made the greatest contribution. However, the anti-aircraft value of analog computers such as the Mark 1 was greatly reduced with the introduction of jet aircraft, where the relative motion of the target became such that the computer's mechanism could not react quickly enough to produce accurate results. Furthermore, the target speed, originally limited to 300 knots by a mechanical stop, was twice doubled to 600, then 1,200 knots by gear ratio changes.

The design of the postwar Mark 1A may have been influenced by the Bell Labs Mark 8, which was developed as an all electrical computer, incorporating technology from the M9 gun data computer as a safeguard to ensure adequate supplies of fire control computers for the USN during WW2. Surviving Mark 1 computers were upgraded to the Mark 1A standard after World War II ended.

Among the upgrades were removing the vector solver from the Mark 1 and redesigning the reverse coordinate conversion scheme that updated target parameters.

The scheme kept the four component integrators, obscure devices not included in explanations of basic fire control mechanisms. They worked like a ball–type computer mouse, but had shaft inputs to rotate the ball and to determine the angle of its axis of rotation.

The round target course indicator on the right side of the star shell computer with the two panic buttons is a holdover from WW II days when early tracking data and initial angle–output position of the vector solver caused target speed to decrease. Pushbuttons slewed the vector solver quickly.

== See also ==
- Ship gun fire-control system
- Admiralty Fire Control Table
- High Angle Control System
- Gun data computer
- Stabilisierter Leitstand
