= Directing point =

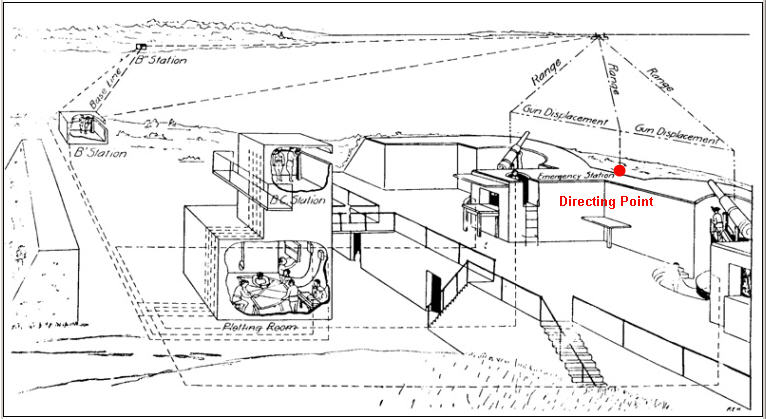
A cut-away drawing of a Coast Artillery battery, showing its two base and stations (upper left), the plotting room (with plotting board), and the directing point (DP) (between the two guns, at right). The directing point, on the surface of the blast apron, is indicated by the red dot. Each gun's displacement (the distance from the pintle center of the gun to the DP) is also indicated.

A copper bolt set in concrete marks the DP for the mortars of Battery Whitman at Fort Andrews in Boston Harbor.

The directing point (DP) was a term used in the United States Army Coast Artillery Corps to identify a precisely surveyed point that was used as the point of reference for preparing the firing data used to aim the guns of a given Coast Artillery battery.

Often the DP was taken as the pintle center of the right-most gun in a battery, as an observer looked over the battery towards the sea. In this case, the referenced gun was called the directing gun.

In a two-gun battery, the DP was often located at a point midway between the two guns (as in the battery illustrated at right). In a four-gun battery, the DP was often located midway between the two central guns. When the guns of a battery were more widely separated, the DP was often taken as a point on the ground perhaps 50 to 100 feet in front of the guns and more or less at the midpoint of the horizontal extent of the battery, visible from all of its guns. An example of such a directing point can be found at Fort Strong, a Coast Artillery fort on Long Island in Boston Harbor (42.330081°N 70.95554°W).

The directing point for Battery Stevenson at Fort Warren, Boston Harbor, set in the grass strip between its two guns.

Sometimes the DP was marked by a survey disk or a copper bolt, set by the U.S. Army Engineers (USE) or by the United States Coast and Geodetic Survey (USC&GS), often in the concrete blast slope or apron or in the ground in front of the parapet of the battery. The photo at left below illustrates a DP like this, between the two guns of Battery Stevenson at Fort Warren in Boston Harbor.

Often a target, for example a vertical wooden sighting panel (or a sighting pole, not unlike a surveyor's target rod) was placed precisely over the DP marker so that the guns of the battery could sight on it and adjust the offsets of their gun sights.

If the guns of a battery were widely separated, the firing data, computed for the DP, might have had to be corrected in azimuth for the various guns. These calculations could be performed in the plotting room and telephoned to the battery or be performed at the guns. If the guns were relatively close to each other, then it might be enough to point them all at the same azimuth, to fire a salvo in parallel with each other.
