= Gun data computer =

Artillery computers used by the U.S. Army

The gun data computer was a series of artillery computers used by the U.S. Army for coastal artillery, field artillery and anti-aircraft artillery applications. For antiaircraft applications they were used in conjunction with a director computer.

== Variations ==
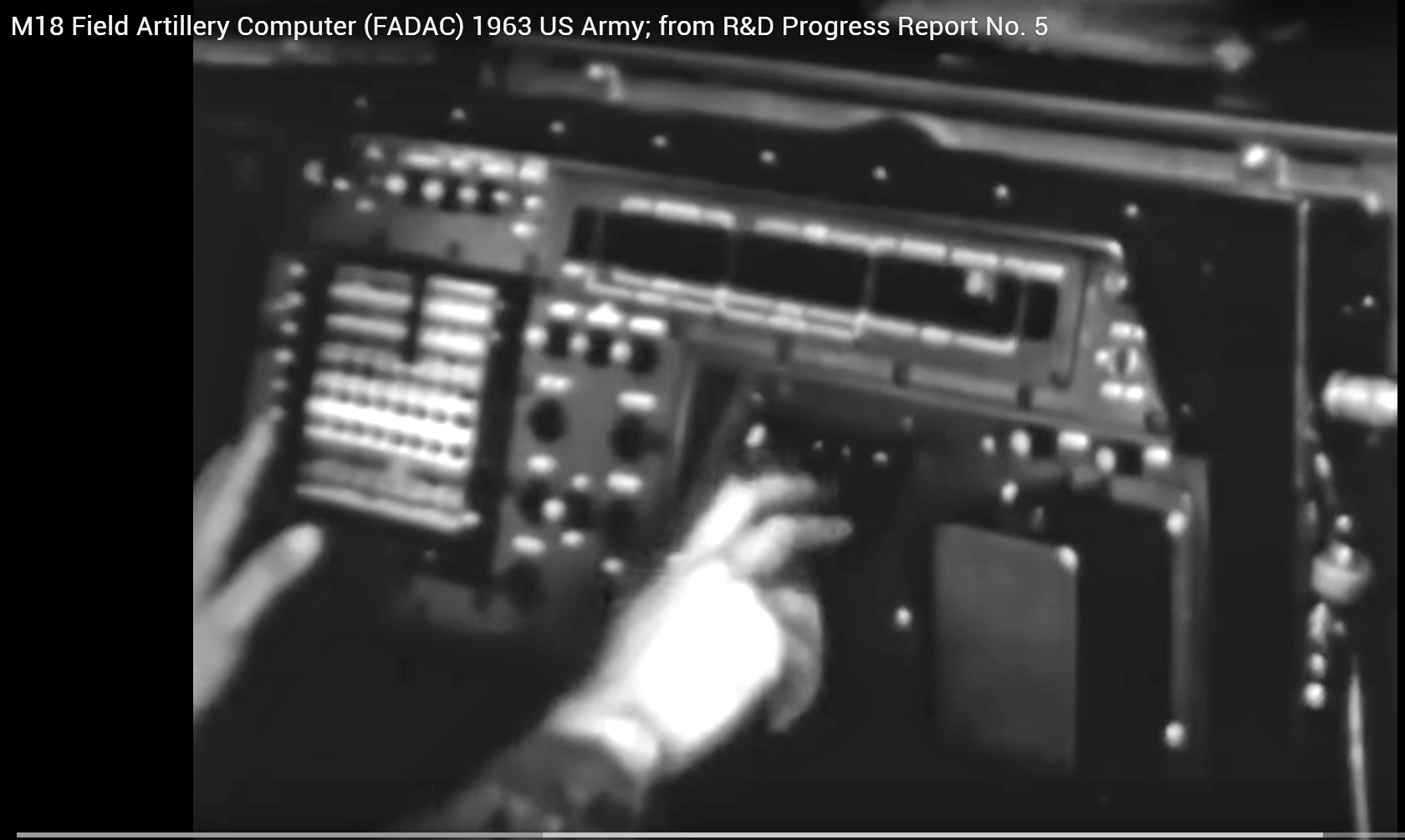
FADAC M18

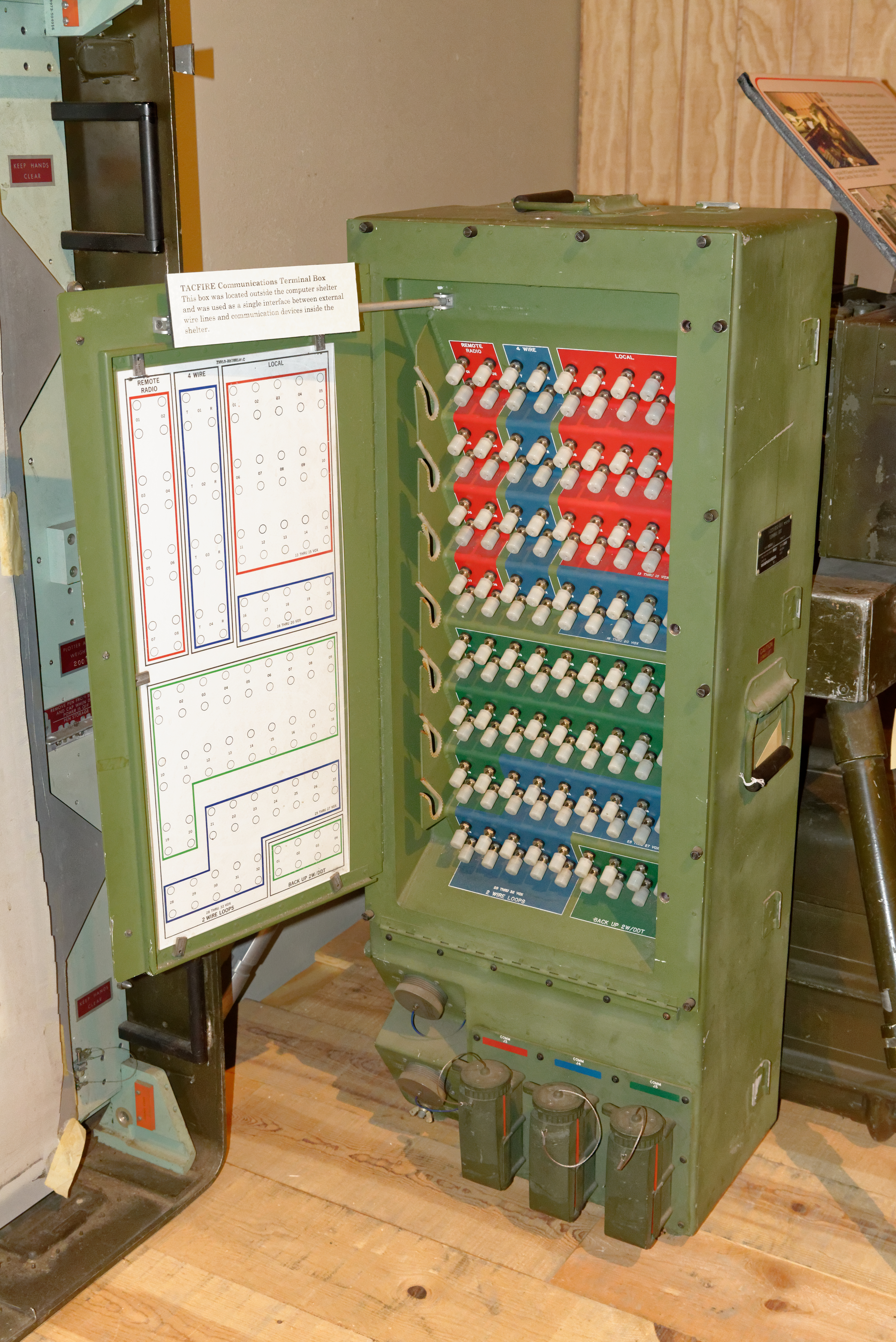
TACFIRE communications terminal box at Fort Sill

- M1: This was used by seacoast artillery for major-caliber seacoast guns. It computed continuous firing data for a battery of two guns that were separated by not more than 1,000 feet (300 m). It utilised the same type of input data furnished by a range section with the then-current (1940) types of position-finding and fire-control equipment.
- M3: This was used in conjunction with the M9 and M10 directors to compute all required firing data, i.e. azimuth, elevation and fuze time. The computations were made continuously, so that the gun was at all times correctly pointed and the fuze correctly timed for firing at any instant. The computer was mounted in the M13 or M14 director trailer.
- M4: This was identical to the M3 except for some mechanisms and parts which were altered to allow for different ammunition being used.
- M8: This was an electronic computer (using vacuum tube technology) built by Bell Labs and used by coast artillery with medium-caliber guns (up to 8 inches or 200 millimetres). It made the following corrections: wind, drift, Earth's rotation, muzzle velocity, air density, height of site and spot corrections.
- M9: This was identical to the M8 except for some mechanisms and parts which were altered to accommodate anti-aircraft ammunition and guns.
- M10: A ballistics computer, part of the M38 fire control system, for Skysweeper anti-aircraft guns.
- M13: A ballistics computer for M48 tanks.
- M14: A ballistics computer for M103 heavy tanks.
- M15: A part of the M35 field artillery fire-control system, which included the M1 gunnery officer console and M27 power supply.
- M16: A ballistics computer for M60A1 tanks.
- M18: FADAC (field artillery digital automatic computer), an all-transistorized general-purpose digital computer manufactured by Amelco (Teledyne Systems, Inc.,) and North American—Autonetics. FADAC was first fielded during 1960, and was the first semiconductor-based digital electronics field-artillery computer.
- M19: A ballistics computer for M60A2 tanks.
- M21: A ballistics computer for M60A3 tanks.
- M23: A mortar ballistics computer.
- M26: A fire-control computer for AH-1 Cobra helicopters, (AH-1F).
- M31: A mortar ballistics computer.
- M32: A mortar ballistics computer, (handheld).
- M1: A ballistics computer for M1 Abrams main battle tanks.

== Systems ==
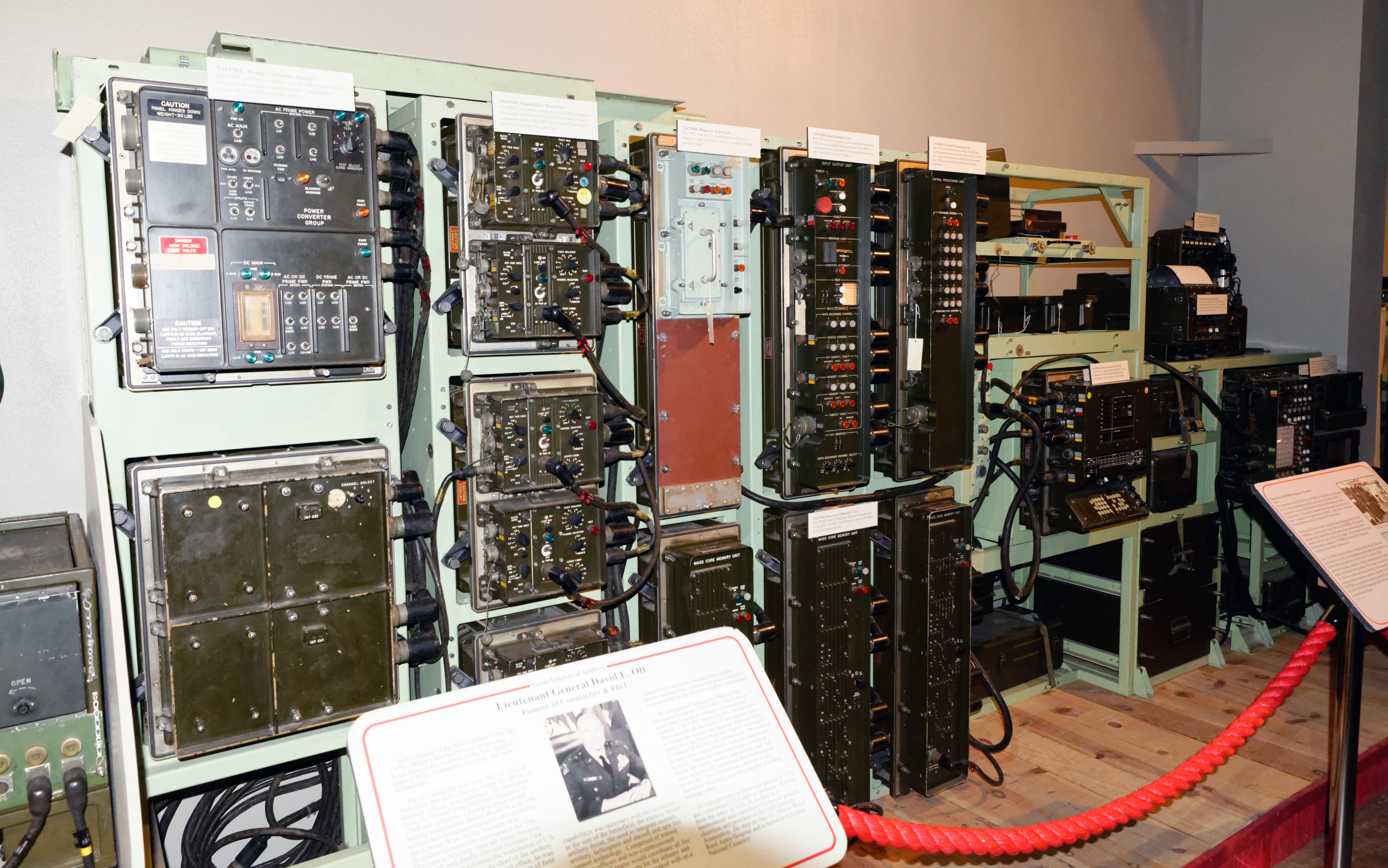
AN/GSG-10 TACFIRE

- The Battery Computer System (BCS) AN/GYK-29 was a computer used by the United States Army for computing artillery fire mission data. It replaced the FADAC and was small enough to fit into the HMMWV combat vehicle.
- The AN/GSG-10 TACFIRE (Tactical Fire) direction system automated field artillery command and control functions. It was composed of computers and remote devices such as the Variable Format Message Entry Device (VFMED), the AN/PSG-2 Digital Message Device (DMD) and the AN/TPQ-36 Firefinder field artillery target acquisition radar system linked by digital communications using existing radio and wire communications equipment. Later it also linked with the BCS which had more advanced targeting algorithms.

The last TACFIRE fielding was completed during 1987. Replacement of TACFIRE equipment began during 1994.

TACFIRE used the AN/GYK-12, a second-generation mainframe computer developed primarily by Litton Industries for Army divisional field artillery (DIVARTY) units. It had two configurations (division and battalion level) housed in mobile command shelters. Field artillery brigades also use the division configuration.

Components of the system were identified using acronyms:

- CPU – Central Processing Unit
- IOU – Input/Output Unit
- MCMU – Mass Core Memory Unit
- DDT – Digital Data Terminal
- MTU – Magnetic Tape Unit
- PCG – Power Converter Group
- ELP – Electronic Line Printer
- DPM – Digital Plotter Map
- ACC – Artillery Control Console
- RCMU – Remote Control Monitoring Unit

The successor to the TACFIRE system is the Advanced Field Artillery Tactical Data System (AFATDS). The AFATDS is the "Fires XXI" computer system for both tactical and technical fire control. It replaced both BCS (for technical fire solutions) and IFSAS/L-TACFIRE (for tactical fire control) systems in U.S. Field Artillery organizations, as well as in maneuver fire support elements at the battalion level and higher. By 2009, the U.S. Army was transitioning from a version based on a Sun Microsystems SPARC computer running the Linux kernel to a version based on laptop computers running the Microsoft Windows operating system.

=== Surviving examples ===
One reason for a lack of surviving examples of early units was the use of radium on the dials. As a result they were classified as hazardous waste and were disposed of by the United States Department of Energy. Currently there is one surviving example of a FADAC computer at the Fort Sill artillery museum.

== See also ==
- Director (military)
- Fire-control system
- Kerrison Predictor
- List of military electronics of the United States
- Mark I Fire Control Computer – US Navy system for 5-inch guns
- Numerical control
- Rangekeeper
