= Barrow Duck-In =

1961 civil disobedience event in Alaska

The Barrow Duck-In was a civil disobedience event that occurred in Utqiaġvik, Alaska (known as Barrow from 1901 to 2016), in the spring of 1961. During the Duck-in, the Iñupiat protested a federal hunting ban on ducks, which threatened their livelihood and rights to food security. The Alaskan North Slope is a remote and rural area, and many residents rely on seasonal bird hunts for sustenance. A series of attempts to regulate Iñupiat subsistence by federal and international entities led to the Duck-in, in which over one-hundred Iñupiaq residents of Utqiaġvik protested waterfowl regulations in the area. The Duck-in is considered a seminal protest, as it had significant influence over future subsistence regulation and Native claims laws in Alaska, such as the Alaska Native Claims Settlement Act (ANCSA).

== History of waterfowl regulations in Alaska ==
Prior to Alaska's statehood and colonization of the Arctic, the Iñupiat freely practiced subsistence hunting of various marine and terrestrial species, such as the bowhead whale, various species of seal, caribou, waterfowl, and fish. Additionally, eiders, rabbits, geese, berries, and roots are of seasonal importance to the Iñupiat. These subsistence activities have been practiced sustainably since time immemorial and retain a high social and cultural significance. In the Alaskan Arctic, subsistence activities exist as a way for the community to gather, celebrate, and share sustenance. Many Iñupiat dances, songs, and cultural practices tell stories of hunts and explain the relationship the Iñupiat have with various Arctic animals, including the common eider. Due to the remote location and lack of infrastructure in Utqiaġvik (and other areas considered Iñupiat homelands), imported foods in 1961 were both incredibly expensive and inaccessible as the primary source of protein in a person's diet. Subsistence foods remain a critical component of food security for communities in the Arctic.

=== Migratory Bird Treaty Conventions ===
In 1918 and 1937, the federal governments of Canada, Mexico, and the United States signed two Migratory Bird Treaty Conventions, which were aimed at protecting North American migration routes for birds. After debate at the congressional level, spring bird hunting was officially outlawed in all three nations. These treaties were primarily an attempt to aid in conservation efforts and combat sport hunting and commercial egg gathering by outlawing duck hunting from March 10 to September 1 of each year. The 1918 Migratory Bird Treaty Act (MTBA) prohibited the harvesting of over 800 types of birds, including the gathering of eggs or feathers. Some Alaska Natives critiqued these treaties for their region-specific approach, claiming that both of these treaties failed to recognize subsistence hunting of bird species, as Iñupiat hunted these birds only during the spring months when they migrated to the North Slope region. Despite the passing of this treaty in 1918, it had little effect in the region until Alaska was granted statehood in 1959. Alaska's new statehood status threatened subsistence practices because of newly imposed federal regulations. Almost five decades later, shortly after Alaska's induction as the 49th state, the state made it compulsory that anyone who hunted out of season would be put in jail. Prior to this, the federal government of Mexico argued that poachers from the states of California, Arizona, and Texas were breaking the terms outlined in the 1916 Migratory Bird Treaty. These treaties were meant to lower rates of poaching of geese and ducks in both Canada and the contiguous United States during critical nesting periods. It was believed by some Iñupiat that the federal government put an unfair amount emphasis on subsistence hunts in the North, as it would be more difficult to address the politically powerful states of California, Arizona, and Texas.

== The Duck-In ==
In 1961, the Iñupiat had experienced a difficult whaling season, as only two whales had been taken for subsistence. The shares from these two whales amounted to only about four meals per family in Utqiaġvik. Because of this, community members were heavily anticipating the spring bird hunt for sustenance throughout the year. Sadie Neakok, Utqiaġvik resident and city magistrate, knew that her community would be relying on that year's migration of birds and would be breaking the law to hunt, and was noted saying that the treaty, "made criminals of all our people breaking the law...Eben Hopson was our senator and I was magistrate when the state made compulsory that anyone who hunted waterfowl out of season would have to be put in jail... And so, Eben and I knew every man, woman, and child who was able to hold a shotgun was guilty of hunting ducks that spring".

On May 20, 1961, Utqiaġvik resident Tim Pikok was arrested for hunting three geese out of season by federal game wardens. Following the arrest, warden Harry Pinkham arrived in Utqiaġvik, alongside resident and state legislature politician John Nusunginya. Shortly after arriving in Utqiaġvik, Nusunginya was arrested by Pinkham for shooting and possessing an eider duck out of season. In the following days, a community meeting was organized to determine a course of action. Neakok recounts that the community decided to protest the treaty by overwhelming the government's response capacity and demand that they jail the entire community. They planned to have every man, woman, and child in Utqiaġvik shoot a duck and show up to the warden's office with them in hand. The next day, 138 residents of Utqiaġvik lined-up outside of the warden's office with a harvested duck in possession. Each person had signed a statement confirming that they had illegally harvested a duck out of season and requested to be arrested. Oliver Leavitt, a whaling captain, harvested eiders with his whaling crew and distributed them to Utqiaġvik residents, while other residents removed eiders from their ice cellars for the protest. Leavitt noted that, "some took two, one for the arrest and one for dinner". Upon seeing the crowd of community members outside of his office, Pinkham hurried to the home of Utqiaġvik magistrate, Sadie Neakok. Neakok recalled that Pinkham had rushed hurriedly to her home in Utqiaġvik after seeing the hundreds of people outside his small office, asking her what he should do. When Neakok asked Pinkham why he did not know what to do as a game warden he responded, "I can't handle that much paperwork".

After each person who had hunted a duck illegally was recorded, state senator Eben Hopson Sr. wrote to Alaska State Governor William Egan, requesting that social welfare officials be sent to the North Slope to take care of the large number of children who would be left without parents if all 138 people were arrested. After Governor Egan was contacted, the Utqiaġvik game wardens realized that it was impossible for them to arrest and jail nearly the entire community of Utqiaġvik, as well as arrange for social welfare to fly to the remote town. Instead, the wardens gathered the over six-hundred pounds of illegally caught eider and took two flights to Fairbanks to store the birds as evidence. Despite these difficulties, the Secretary of the Interior Stewardt Udall still insisted that all those who were in illegal possession of eider ducks should be arrested. However, Udall's attempts were unsuccessful, as they would have to take several flights between Fairbanks and Utqiaġvik to transport all involved.

=== Aftermath ===
The Duck-In controversy settled for a few weeks, and in this time the U.S. Bureau of Sport Fisheries and Wildlife continued to believe that they should enforce the treaty and arrest those in Utqiaġvik who broke it. Ray Trembley, head of the federal agency, broke silence on the Duck-In by saying, "We have our orders, and we will enforce the treaty and will arrest anyone we find taking ducks between now and September 1". Despite the resistance from the federal government, representatives of both the state and local governments in Alaska stood in solidarity with the Iñupiat, and a resolution was passed by the Alaska State Legislature to voice Alaska's support of Utqiaġvik. Women in Utqiaġvik publicly expressed that if the men were arrested, they would continue to hunt in order to provide for their families and the community. In the weeks following the Duck-In, articles were published in the Washington Post and New York Times, describing the unfair subsistence regulations and voicing support for Alaska Native peoples. President John F. Kennedy and Secretary Udall received hundreds of letters from across the nation condemning the regulations and enforcement actions by the U.S. Bureau of Sports Fisheries and Wildlife. Even after a public outry, the US Attorney General announced that he would not arrest the 138 residents of Utqiaġvik but would prosecute all future violations. An Alaskan delegation (consisting of the Governor Egan and other state legislators) met with Secretary Udall in D.C. to express their discontent with the enforcement. Governor Egan requested that federal government allow Native hunters and communities to be left alone to engage in, "subsistence, peace and contentment".

In March 1962, following nearly a year of pressure from Alaska Natives, Governor Egan, and national press, U.S Fish and Wildlife commissioner Clarence Pautzke instructed enforcement officers to notify subsistence communities of their patrol dates ahead of their visits. This way, local hunters would know when Fish & Wildlife officers would be in town and could prepare to not hunt for the three-day period. The process of officers letting subsistence communities know of their visits became standard practice until 1997 when hunts were no longer considered illegal.

=== Subsistence bird hunting today ===
Today, Iñupiat subsistence hunts of migratory birds continues and these migratory populations remain healthy and abundant. Migratory bird subsistence populations in the Alaskan Arctic are co-managed by the U.S. Fish and Wildlife Service, Alaska Department of Fish & Game, and Alaska Native representatives from tribal organizations throughout Alaska, as well as the North Slope Borough This co-management group is known as the Alaska Migratory Bird Co-Management Council (AMBCC), and is tasked with providing annual harvest recommendations, yearly assessments of the eider populations, reports on subsistence hunts, and educational outreach statewide.

=== Impacts ===
The Barrow Duck-In was a highly significant event, as it protected Iñupiat subsistence rights and set a precedent that would influence federal regulatory policies enacted in the 1970s. Overall, the Duck-In, Project Chariot, and Rampart Dam proposal helped grow Alaska Native solidarity and displayed the effectiveness of grassroots actions against unfair federal regulations. In 1971, ten years after the Barrow Duck-in, President Nixon signed the Alaska Native Claims Settlement Act (ANCSA), which incorporated rights to self-determination in Native land claim policy. ANCSA settled Native land claims in Alaska by redistributing over 44 million acres of land back to tribal groups and $962 million paid back over a course of eleven years from taxation on oil activities in the area. This act set up the Arctic Slope Regional Corporation, a Native corporation on the North Slope of Alaska with over 13,000 Iñupiat shareholders and control of 5 million acres of land in the region.

=== Apology from governments ===
In September 2018, the U.S. Fish and Wildlife Service issued an official apology to Alaska Native peoples for the actions game wardens took to implement the Migratory Bird Treaty Act of 1918. Prior to the Duck-in, game wardens arrested and cited dozens of Alaska Natives for subsisting migratory bird populations. Even after the Duck-In, the presence of wardens in town meant that community members would have to "hide" from officials in order to hunt during an official visit. The apology was delivered in Anchorage, AK at an Alaska Migratory Bird Co-Management Council meeting, where both federal government representatives and Native tribal officials were present. Sam Cotten, commissioner for the Alaska Department of Fish & Game offered an apology on behalf of ADFG saying, "We recognized that the regulations were wrong, that they prohibited hunting of migratory birds when you needed it most during the springtime. We got it wrong. We regret that. We caused harm. We're happy that's been resolved."

== Similar protests ==
Around the same time of the Duck-in, Native groups throughout the United States were also engaging in acts of civil disobedience to protest unfair regulations and bans on subsistence hunting. A series of 1960s protests, happening at the same time of the American Civil Rights Movement, occurred in Washington state with local Indigenous groups protesting to protect fishing rights. These protests were known as the Fish Wars, in which Native tribes of the Puget Sound area (Muckleshoot, Nisqually, and Puyallup) protested the denial of treaty rights by fishing in ancestral waterways as an act of defiance. These fish-in protests were gathering places for Native peoples, where activists and community leaders gathered to strategize and form solidarity. These ideas and grassroots protests would later be incorporated into the Red Power Movement.

== Notable figures ==
- Eben Hopson Sr.
- Sadie Neakok
- John Nusunginya
- William A. Egan
- Stewart Udall
