= Sadie Neakok =

American judge

Sadie Neakok

Sadie Neakok (March 16, 1916 – June 13, 2004) or Tagiagiña (last name pronounced Niaquq in Iñupiaq) was the first female magistrate in Alaska. She served in Alaska's Second Judicial District in Utqiaġvik, Alaska.

== Personal life ==
Her father, Charles D. Brower, was a United States Commissioner in the Alaska territory and her mother, Ahsiangatok (Asiaŋŋataq), was Iñupiaq from the Barrow area. Her father originally moved to the Alaska to work as a commercial whaler and was the first white settler there. Neakok was born in 1916. One of ten children, she was sent to San Francisco, California at the age of 14 to attend high school and then attended the University of Alaska. After graduation, she worked first in a hospital, and then as a teacher in a Bureau of Indian Affairs school and a social worker.

She married Nathaniel Neakok, a whaling boat captain who also worked at the Barrow Airport, in 1940 and together they had 13 children and several foster children. As of 1989, the couple had been married for over 50 years. Her oldest son, Bill, was mayor of Utqiaġvik (then Barrow) in the 1970s.

She died in 2004. In 1992 Margaret B. Blackman wrote her biography, Sadie Brower Neakok: An Inupiaq Woman.

In 2009, Neakok was inducted into the Alaska Women's Hall of Fame. She was the first woman elder in her Presbyterian church.

== Judicial career ==
She became a magistrate in Alaska's Second Judicial District when the territory gained statehood in 1958. She ran the court in both the English and Iñupiaq languages, and had to fight to allow cases to be heard in the local language when defendants did not speak English. She followed Eben Hopson, who encouraged her to take the position. Before a courthouse was built, she heard cases in her kitchen.

== Inuit advocate ==
As a half Inupiaq, Neakok was an advocate in Alaska and in Washington DC for Inuit causes. As a child, she saw the local Naval base enforcing discriminatory segregation against the native people, inspiring her to defend them. As an adult, she served on the tribal council.

In 1961, in response to what she viewed as an unjust hunting law, she helped organize The Barrow Duck-In.

== See also ==
- List of first women lawyers and judges in Alaska
