= Charles Brower =

Charles Brower may refer to:

- Charles H. Brower (1901–1984), American advertising executive, copywriter, and author
- Charles N. Brower, American judge
- Charles Andrew Brower (1857–1924), Ontario farmer and political figure
- Charles D. Brower (1863–1945), American whaler, trader, postmaster, and writer
