= Native Village of Barrow Inupiat Traditional Government =

Alaska Native Village

The Native Village of Barrow Inupiat Traditional Government (previously, Native Village of Barrow) (Iñupiaq: Utqiaġviŋmiut Iñupiat Kavamaat) is a U.S. federally recognized Alaska Native Iñupiat tribal entity, as listed by the Bureau of Indian Affairs circa 2003. Located in Utqiaġvik, Alaska, it is part of the North Slope Borough. The constitution and by-laws of the native village were established in 1940 under the Indian Reorganization Act (IRA) of 1934. An IRA corporation was also created.

This corporation is not to be confused with the for-profit village corporation in Barrow, Ukpeaġvik Iñupiat Corporation (UIC), created under the Alaska Native Claims Settlement Act of 1971.
