= List of federal lands in Alaska =

Federal lands in Alaska include:

| Name | Location | Year established | Area (2024) |
|---|---|---|---|
| Denali National Park | National park | 1917 | 4,740,911.16 acres (19,185.7868 km^{2}) |
| Gates of the Arctic National Park | National park | 1980 | 7,523,897.45 acres (30,448.1327 km^{2}) |
| Glacier Bay National Park | National park | 1980 | 3,223,383.43 acres (13,044.5699 km^{2}) |
| Katmai National Park | National park | 1980 | 3,674,529.33 acres (14,870.2926 km^{2}) |
| Kenai Fjords National Park | National park | 1980 | 669,650.05 acres (2,709.9776 km^{2}) |
| Kobuk Valley National Park | National park | 1980 | 1,750,716.16 acres (7,084.8969 km^{2}) |
| Lake Clark National Park | National park | 1980 | 2,619,816.49 acres (10,602.0212 km^{2}) |
| Wrangell–St. Elias National Park | National park | 1980 | 8,323,146.48 acres (33,682.5788 km^{2}) |
| Aniakchak National Monument and Preserve | National monument | 1978 | 137,176.00 acres (555.1316 km^{2}) |
| Cape Krusenstern National Monument | National monument | 1978 | 649,096.15 acres (2,626.7989 km^{2}) |
| Aniakchak National Monument and Preserve | National preserve | | 464,117.93 acres (1,878.2186 km^{2}) |
| Bering Land Bridge National Preserve | National preserve | | 2,697,391.01 acres (10,915.9541 km^{2}) |
| Denali National Park and Preserve | National preserve | | 1,334,117.80 acres (5,398.9832 km^{2}) |
| Gates of the Arctic National Park and Preserve | National preserve | | 948,608.07 acres (3,838.8807 km^{2}) |
| Glacier Bay National Park and Preserve | National preserve | | 58,406.00 acres (236.3607 km^{2}) |
| Katmai National Park and Preserve | National preserve | | 418,698.80 acres (1,694.4139 km^{2}) |
| Lake Clark National Park and Preserve | National preserve | | 1,410,293.68 acres (5,707.2560 km^{2}) |
| Noatak National Preserve | National preserve | | 6,587,071.39 acres (26,656.9322 km^{2}) |
| Wrangell–St. Elias National Park and Preserve | National preserve | | 4,852,644.89 acres (19,637.9571 km^{2}) |
| Yukon–Charley Rivers National Preserve | National preserve | | 2,526,512.44 acres (10,224.4331 km^{2}) |
| Klondike Gold Rush National Historical Park (part of Klondike Gold Rush International Historical Park) | National historical parks | | 12,996.49 acres (52.5949 km^{2}) |
| Sitka National Historical Park | National historical parks | | 116.29 acres (0.4706 km^{2}) |
| Alagnak Wild River | National rivers and national wild and scenic rivers | | 30,664.79 acres (124.0960 km^{2}) |
| Chilkoot National Historic Trail | National historic and scenic trails | | |
| Aleutian World War II National Historic Area (affiliated area) | Other NPS protected areas and administrative group | | 134.94 acres (0.5461 km^{2}) |
| Inupiat Heritage Center (affiliated area) | Other NPS protected areas and administrative group | | 0.00 acres (0 km^{2}) |
| Fort Egbert | U.S. Army base | | |
| Iditarod Trail | Bureau of Land Management area | | |
| National Petroleum Reserve–Alaska | Bureau of Land Management area | | |
| Steese National Conservation Area | Bureau of Land Management area | | |
