= International Inuit Day =

Annual holiday

- Date: 7 November
- Next time: 7 November 2025
- Frequency: annual

International Inuit Day (Inuktitut: ᐃᓄᐃᑦ ᐅᑉᓗᐊᓂ, romanized: Inuit Upluani), also known as International Circumpolar Inuit Day (Inuktitut: Tamaat Ukiuktaqtuniitunik Inuit Ubluangit), is a holiday that was created to celebrate Inuit and amplify their voices. It falls on 7 November.

The holiday was established by the Inuit Circumpolar Council in 2006 at their general assembly in Utqiagvik. The council chose 7 November to honour the birth of Eben Hopson Sr., the organizer of the first Inuit Circumpolar Conference.
