= Barrow High School =

Public high school in Utqiaġvik, Alaska, United States

Coordinates: 71°17′21″N 156°46′04″W

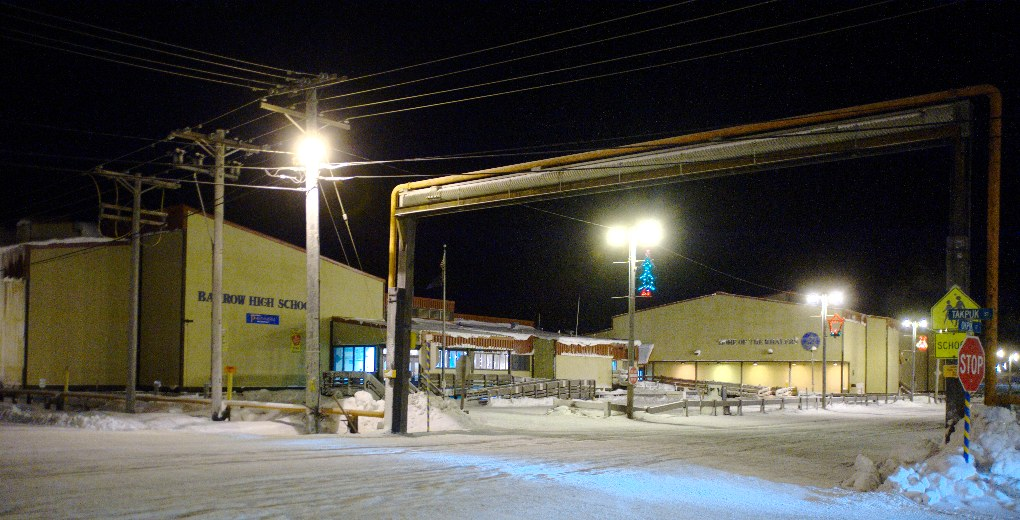
- Barrow High School in the dark of winter

Location
- 1965 Takpuk St; Utqiaġvik, Alaska 99723; United States

Information
- Type: Public
- CEEB code: 020011
- Principal: Nancy Zook
- Grades: 9–12
- Enrollment: 266 (2023–2024)
- Campus: Remote
- Colors: Blue and gold
- Mascot: Whaler
- Website: bhs.nsbsd.org

Barrow High School is a public high school in Utqiaġvik (formerly Barrow), Alaska, United States, operated by the North Slope Borough School District. As of the 2016–2017 school year, the school had 232 students.

== Athletics ==
=== Football ===
A high school football team was established at the school in 2006. It is the only known American football team to have its home field north of the Arctic Circle.

In 2011, the football team finished the regular season with a 7–1 record and qualified for the Alaska Small School State Playoffs. They eventually advanced to the state finals, but were defeated by Nikiski High School. The Whalers' football team finished the season with an 8–2 record.

In 2015, the Barrow High School football team and its staff participated in a TV show entitled Football Town: Barrow, Alaska, which chronicled the team during their 2015 season. The show was broadcast on the NFL Network and premiered on September 22, 2015. The season ran for eight episodes and followed the daily lives of the Whalers' football players, coaches, parents, and staff throughout the season. The Whalers ended the 2015 season with a 5–3 record, and qualified for the Alaska state playoffs, but were eliminated in the first round by powerhouse Nikiski. The Whalers finished the 2015 season with a 5–4 record and were ranked as the #20 high school football team in Alaska by MaxPreps.

In 2017, the football team won the state title.

In 2018, the football team would advance to the state finals but were defeated by Eielson with the score 36–0.

The 2019 season would see the team once again reach the Division III state finals losing to Houston 41–8.

=== Basketball ===
In 2015, the Barrow boys' basketball team won the Alaska Class 3A State Championship with a 50–40 victory over two-time defending state champion, Monroe Catholic. The Whalers' team was led by 5-star recruit Kamaka Hepa, a 6'7" freshman who was regarded as one of the top basketball recruits in the country. He was ranked as the #21 ranked basketball recruit in the country by ESPN for the class of 2018. The Whalers' boys' basketball team finished the 2014–2015 season with a 24–3 record, the highest win percentage in school history.

=== Championships ===
- Boys' Basketball – State Champions (2015, 2016, 2018). State Runner-Up (2004, 2005)
- Girls' Basketball – State Champions (2007, 2011, 2013, 2016, 2022). State Runner-Up (2003, 2006, 2008)
- Football – State Champions (2017) – State Finalists (2011, 2018, 2019)
- Volleyball – State Champions (2003, 2005, 2006, 2008)

== See also ==
- Bentley Mall
- List of high schools in Alaska
