= Tikiġaq School =

School in Alaska, United States

Coordinates: 68°20′59″N 166°44′08″W

Tikiġaq School is a school in Point Hope, Alaska, that provides education from pre-kindergarten to grade 12. It is a part of the North Slope Borough School District.

As of 2014, it had 46 employees and 229 students. Half of the employees were certified while the other half were classified.

== History ==
As of 2014, most principals only stay at the school for up to one year.

== Athletics ==
The high-school boys' basketball team has won three consecutive Class 2-A Alaska championships. Basketball became popular before a gymnasium was built, and passing became important as dribbling was difficult on makeshift courts and on snow. An up-tempo, skillful passing game has characterized play since then by the Harpooners and Harponerettes, as the boys' and girls' teams are known, enabling them to beat rival schools from districts with much larger population bases.

== Note ==
- Some material originated from Point Hope, Alaska
