= Avak crater =

Impact crater in north Alaska

- Location: Utqiagvik, Alaska; 71°15′N 156°30′W

Impact crater structure
- Confidence: Confirmed
- Diameter: 12 km (7.5 mi)
- Age: 3-95 Ma
- Exposed: No
- Drilled: Yes

Avak is an impact crater centered approximately 12 km (7.5 mi) southeast of Utqiagvik, Alaska, United States.

Avak is a subcircular structure about 12 km (7.5 mi) in diameter and 1 km (0.62 mi) deep. In the structure, metamorphic basement rocks and regionally flat lying sedimentary rocks are uplifted and intensely deformed. The Avak structure has no surface expression in the swampy, lake-dotted tundra of the Arctic coastal plain. The structure is covered by a thin veneer of permanently frozen Pliocene and Pleistocene rock. This means that the age of the impact took place anywhere between 3 million and 95 million years ago. Palynological data on its ejecta suggest Middle–Late Turonian age of the impact (about 90 million years ago).

The Avak structure provides the structural trap for the natural gas in the adjacent South Barrow and East Barrow gas fields. These fields have accumulated about 37 bcf of natural gas in Jurassic sandstones.

== History ==
The Avak structure was first recognized from seismic surveys in the National Petroleum Reserve No. 4 (NPR4) by the U.S. Navy during the period from 1943 to 1953. The Navy drilled the Avak 1 well in 1951–1952 and encountered deformed rocks from near the surface to a total depth of 1,225 m (4,019 ft). Shatter cones and other evidence of impact origin was found.

In 1995, geologists from the Geological Survey of Canada and U.S. Geological Survey found another group of mineralogic features that indicated that Avak is a meteorite impact structure: the planar deformation features.
