= North Slope Borough School District =

School district in Alaska, United States

Address
- 829 Aivik Street Utqiaġvik, Alaska, 99723; United States

District information
- Type: Public
- Grades: Pre-K–12
- NCES District ID: 0200610

Students and staff
- Students: 1,853
- Teachers: 162.1
- Staff: 238.4
- Student–teacher ratio: 11.43

Other information
- Website: www.nsbsd.org

North Slope Borough School District (NSBSD) is a school district headquartered in Utqiaġvik, Alaska (formerly Barrow).

It serves all areas of the North Slope Borough. This makes it the largest school district in the United States by area, with a total area of around 229,731 km^{2} (88,700 sq mi)

== Schools ==
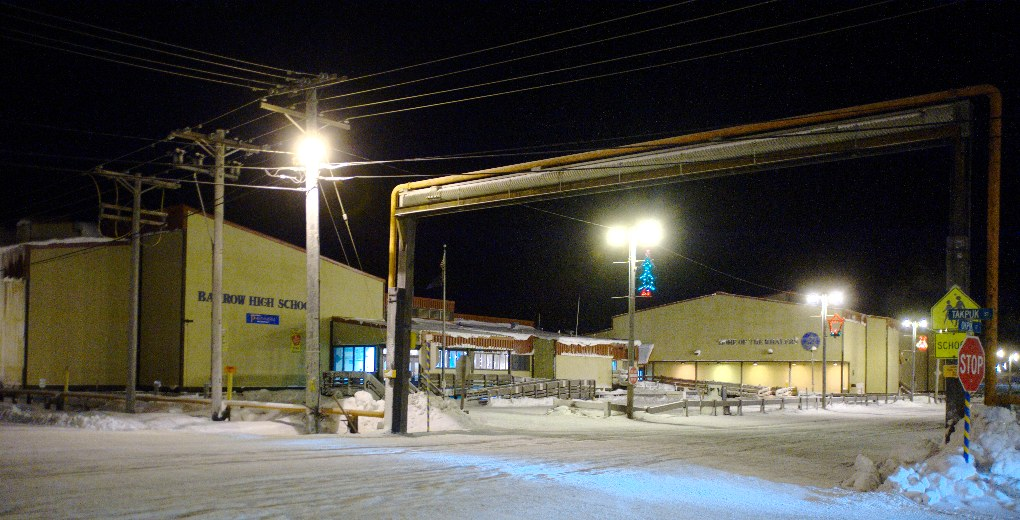
Barrow High School

K-12 schools:

- Alak School (Wainwright)
- Kali School (Point Lay)
- Harold Kaveolook School (Kaktovik)
- Meade River School (Atqasuk)
- Nuiqsut Trapper School (Nuiqsut)
- Nunamiut School (Anaktuvuk Pass)
- Tikiġaq School (Point Hope)

Schools in Utqiaġvik:

- Barrow High School
- Hopson Middle School
- Fred Ipalook Elementary School
- Kiita Learning Community
