= Iñupiat Heritage Center =

Museum in Alaska, U.S.

Coordinates: 71°17′55″N 156°45′12″W

The Iñupiat Heritage Center is a museum in Utqiaġvik in the U.S. state of Alaska. Dedicated in February 1999, it is an affiliated area of New Bedford Whaling National Historical Park in New Bedford, Massachusetts, and recognizes the contributions of Alaska Natives to the history of whaling.

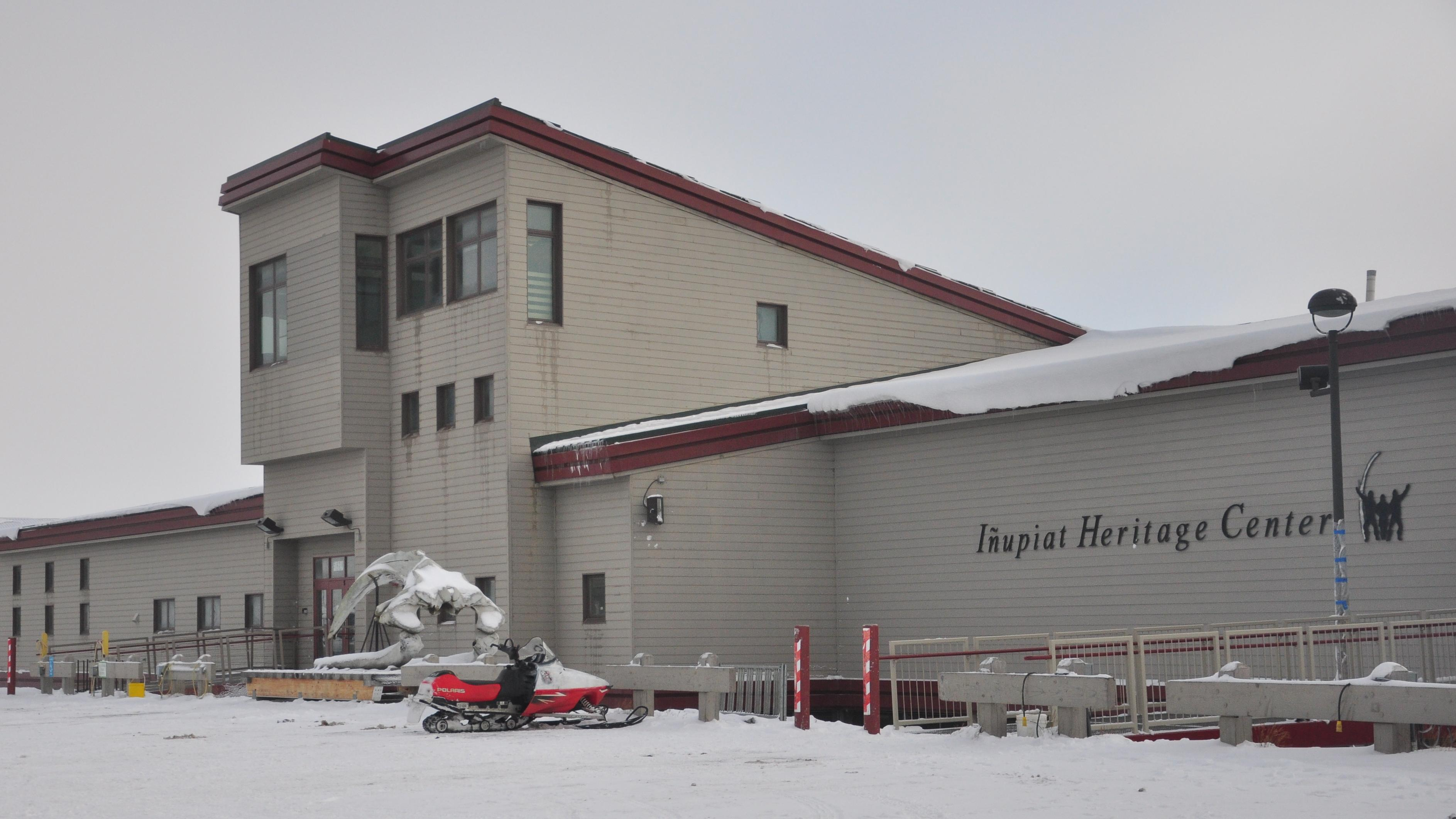
Iñupiat Heritage Center in 2011

It houses exhibits, artifact collections, a library, a gift shop, and a traditional room where traditional crafts are demonstrated and taught. The North Slope Borough owns and manages the Heritage Center on behalf of the whaling villages of the North Slope. The Heritage Center is one of several associated partners that participate in telling the story of commercial whaling in the United States. Park partners operate independently but collaborate in a variety of educational and interpretive programs.

The Iñupiat Heritage Center (IHC) brings people together to promote and perpetuate Iñupiat history, language and culture. This dynamic interaction between the Iñupiat and their environment fosters the awareness, understanding and appreciation of the Iñupiat way of life from generation to generation.

== History ==
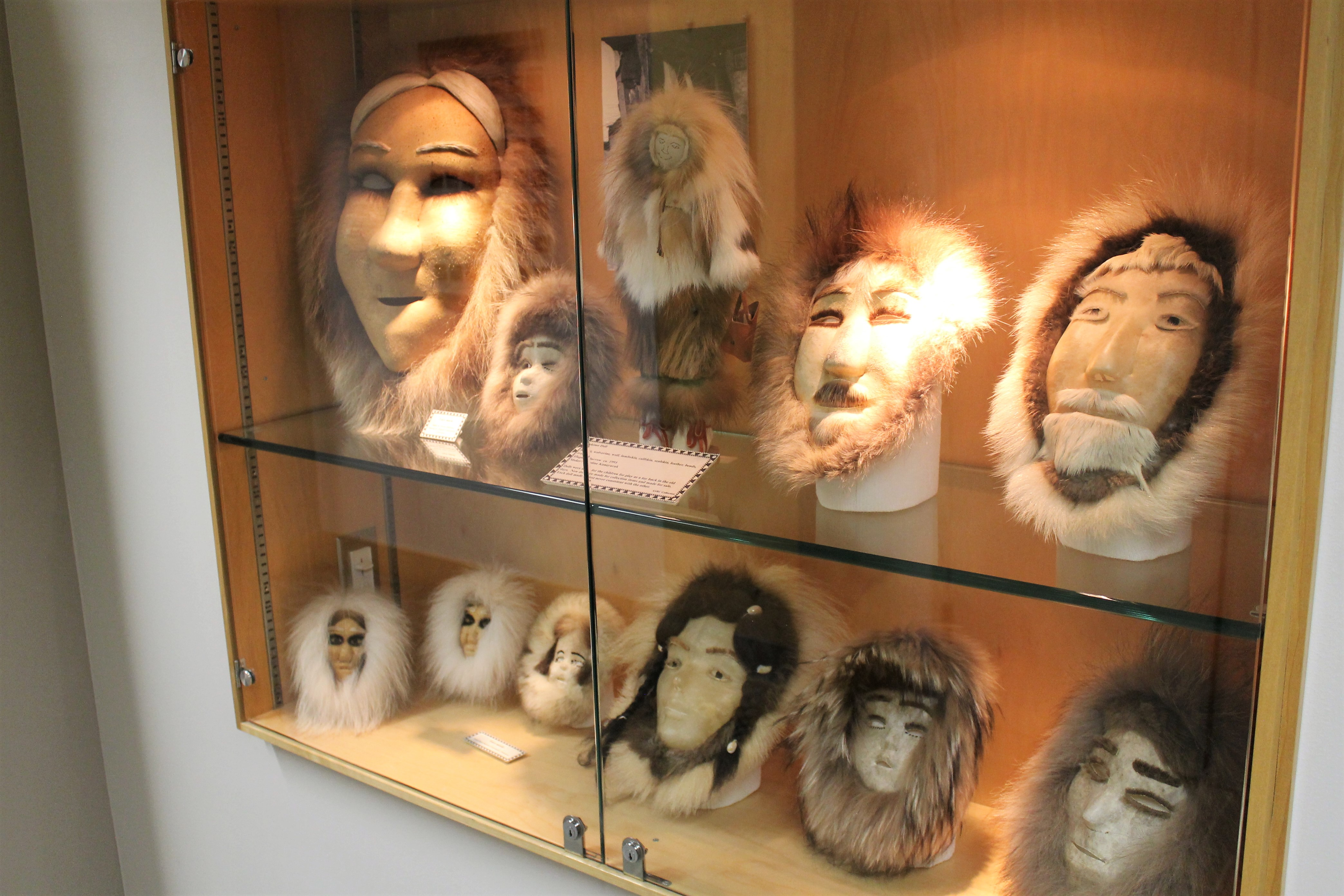
Display of masks at the center

In the late 19th and 20th centuries, more than 2,000 whaling voyages set out from New Bedford bound for the bowhead whaling grounds off Alaska's Arctic coast. The whalers developed the following route for their voyage of over 20,000 miles: to the Azore islands off the coast of Africa, around Cape Horn and the southernmost tip of South America, to the Hawaiian Islands, and finally to the Bering Sea and Arctic Ocean. They were often gone for years at a time, and processed the whales on board.

Many Alaska Natives, particularly Iñupiat Eskimo people, participated in commercial whaling. In addition to crewing on the American ships, they hunted for food for the whalers, provided warm fur clothing, and sheltered many crews who were shipwrecked on the Alaska coast.
