= Ukpeaġvik Iñupiat Corporation =

Alaska Native village corporation

Ukpeaġvik Iñupiat Corporation, or UIC, is one of about 200 Alaska Native village corporations created under the Alaska Native Claims Settlement Act of 1971 (ANCSA) in settlement of aboriginal land claims. Ukpeaġvik Iñupiat Corporation was incorporated in Alaska on April 19, 1973. Located in Utqiaġvik, Alaska, Ukpeaġvik Iñupiat Corporation is a for-profit corporation whose Alaska Native shareholders are primarily of Iñupiat descent.

The name of the corporation derives from one of the Iñupiaq names for Utqiaġvik, ukpiaġvik, which means "place to hunt snowy owls."

== Officers and directors ==
A current listing of Ukpeaġvik Iñupiat Corporation's officers and directors, as well as documents filed with the State of Alaska since UIC's incorporation, are available online through the Corporations Database of the Division of Corporations, Business & Professional Licensing, Alaska Department of Commerce, Community and Economic Development.

== Shareholders ==
At incorporation, Ukpeaġvik Iñupiat Corporation enrolled Alaska Native shareholders, each of whom received 100 shares of UIC stock. As an ANCSA corporation, Ukpeaġvik Iñupiat Corporation has no publicly traded stock and its shares cannot legally be sold.

== Lands ==
When the United States purchased the Alaskan Territory from Russia in 1867, the only land ownership recognized by American law was that obtained by Russian title. Like the Native Americans of the 48 contiguous states, Alaskan Natives were granted claims to ancestral lands, but had no citizenship rights. When Alaskan statehood was granted in 1959, the federal government claimed most of the land.

In response, Alaskan Natives began to dispute government claims, making "who owns Alaska" a national issue, particularly after oil was discovered on the Northern Slope. In response, Congress passed the Alaska Native Claims Settlement Act (ANCSA) in 1971, extinguishing Alaska Native land claims in exchange for about 11 percent of Alaska plus $962.5 million. By conveying Native land title to 12 regional and 200 local village corporations, the ANCSA changed the relationship between Natives and the land from communal tenure to corporate ownership.

As a result, the Iñupiat people of Utqiaġvik, Alaska, the northernmost community in the United States located 330 miles north of the Arctic Circle, established the Ukpeaġvik Iñupiat Corporation (UIC). Utqiaġvik, formerly known as Barrow, named for Sir John Barrow who led the first polar expedition to the area, was called Ukpeaġvik, or place to hunt snowy owls" by the Iñupiat people. The town is the largest community on the North Slope, and more than two-thirds of its 4,600 people are Iñupiat.

Ukpeaġvik Iñupiat Corporation owns 212,000 acres (858 km^{2}) of land in Alaska's North Slope Borough. As provided under ANCSA, subsurface estate in UIC lands is owned by the Alaska Native regional corporation for the region, Arctic Slope Regional Corporation.

== Business enterprises ==
As of 2015, Ukpeaġvik Iñupiat Corporation was ranked 10th by Alaska Business Monthly among Alaska-owned and based companies.

Under federal law, UIC and its majority-owned subsidiaries, joint ventures and partnerships are deemed to be "minority and economically disadvantaged business enterprise[s]" (43 USC 1626(e)).

== Lines of Business ==
Overview:
Ukpeaġvik Iñupiat Corporation (UIC) is a diverse corporation. Their family of companies offers Construction, Architecture and Engineering, Regulatory Consulting, Oil Spill Response, Marine Services, Information Technology, Maintenance and Manufacturing, and Logistics services to government and commercial customers locally and nationwide. They also offer several services to the residents of Utqiaġvik, AK to support the growing community such as car rental and repair, hospitality, catering, facility maintenance, compressed natural gas sales and real estate management.

UIC's family of companies include the following first tier holding companies: UIC Holdings, UIC Construction Services, UIC Professional Services, UIC Marine Services, UIC Maintenance and Manufacturing and UIC Government Services.
