= Utqiagvik, Alaska =

City in Alaska, United States

Utqiaġvik
- City
- City of Utqiaġvik
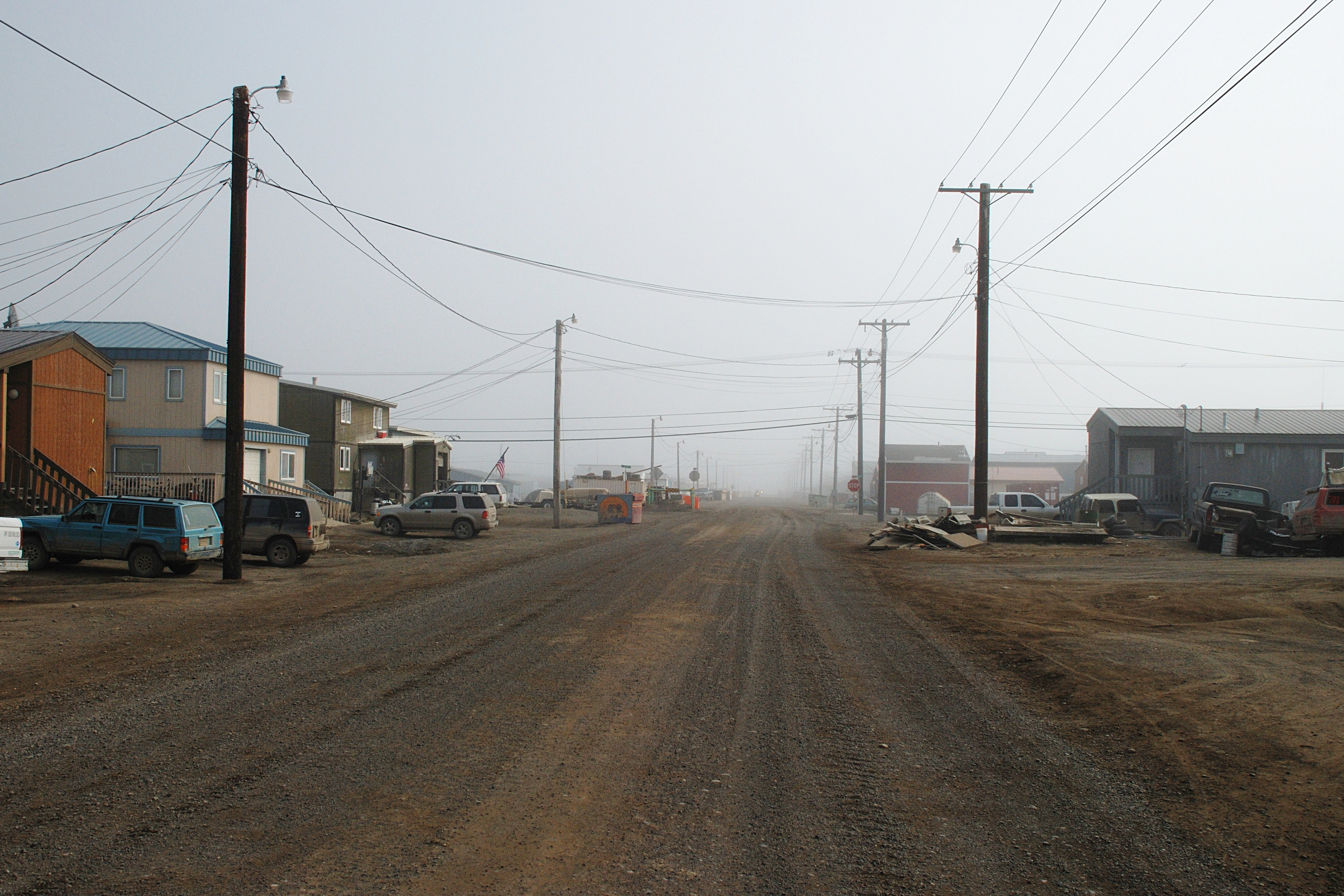
- Street view of Utqiagvik in 2008

- Seal
- Motto: The Northernmost American City
- Location within Alaska Utqiaġvik (North America)
- Coordinates: 71°17′26″N 156°47′19″W
- Country: United States
- State: Alaska
- Borough: North Slope
- Incorporated: June 8, 1959

Government
  - City Mayor: Asisaun Toovak
  - Borough mayor: Josiah Patkotak
  - State Senator: Donny Olson (D)
  - State Rep: Robyn Frier (D)

Area
  - Total: 21.48 sq mi (55.63 km^{2})
  - Land: 18.77 sq mi (48.61 km^{2})
  - Water: 2.71 sq mi (7.01 km^{2})
- Elevation: 10 ft (3.0 m)

Population (2020)
  - Total: 4,927
  - Density: 262.5/sq mi (101.35/km^{2})
- Time zone: UTC−09:00 (AKST)
  - Summer (DST): UTC−08:00 (AKDT)
- ZIP code: 99723
- Area code: 907
- FIPS code: 02-05200
- GNIS ID: 1398635
- Website: utqiagvik.us

Utqiaġvik, (Note: Pronounced /ˌʊtkiˈɑːɡvɪk/ UUT-kee-AHG-vik; Inupiaq: Utqiaġvik, pronounced [utqe.ɑʁvik]. The official English name is spelled with a diacritical mark on the "g", from the Inuktitut spelling.) formerly known as Barrow from 1825 to 2016, (Note: Pronounced /ˈbæroʊ/ BARR-oh.) is the borough seat and largest city of the North Slope Borough in the U.S. state of Alaska. Located north of the Arctic Circle, it is one of the northernmost cities and towns in the world and the northernmost in the United States, with nearby Point Barrow as the country's northernmost point.

Utqiaġvik's population was 4,927 at the 2020 census, an increase from 4,212 in 2010. It is the 12th-most populated city in Alaska.

== Name ==
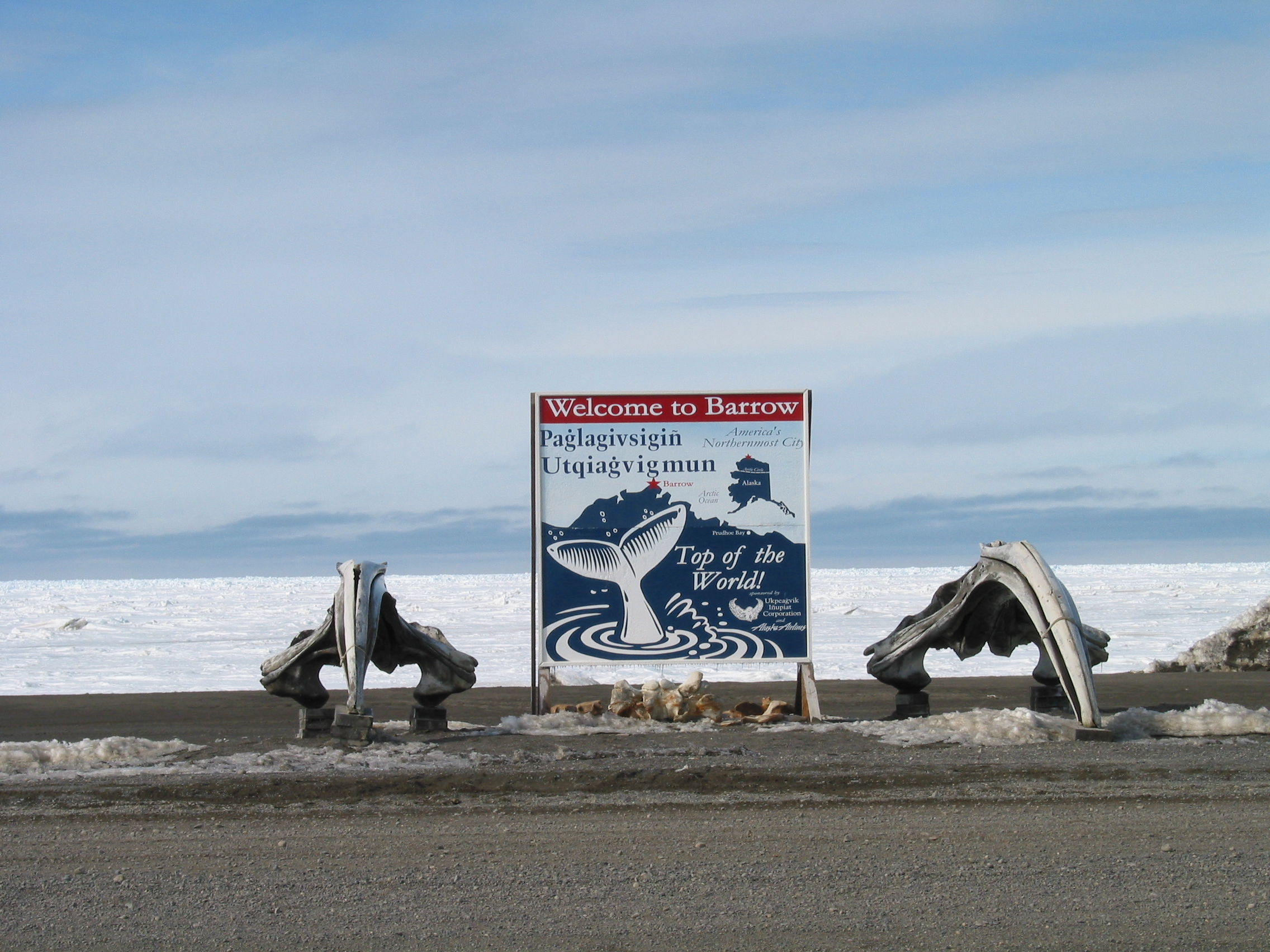
English (Welcome to Barrow) and Iñupiaq (Paġlagivsigiñ Utqiaġvigmun) (2004)

The location has been home to the Iñupiat, an indigenous Inuit ethnic group, for more than 1,500 years. The city's Iñupiaq name refers to a place for gathering wild roots. It is derived from the Iñupiat word utqiq, also used for the Eskimo potato (Claytonia tuberosa). The name was first recorded by European explorers in 1853 as "Ot-ki-a-wing" by Commander Rochfort Maguire, Royal Navy. John Simpson's native map dated 1855 has the name "Otkiawik", which was later misprinted on a British Admiralty chart as "Otkiovik".

The former name Barrow was derived from Point Barrow and was originally a general designation because non-native Alaskan residents found it easier to pronounce than the Inupiat name. Point Barrow was named after Sir John Barrow of the British Admiralty by explorer Frederick William Beechey in 1825. A U.S. post office was established in 1901, which helped the name "Barrow" to become dominant.

Following a referendum approved by residents on October 6, 2016, the city's name was formally changed from Barrow to Utqiaġvik on December 1, 2016. City Council member Qaiyaan Harcharek said the name change supports the use of the Iñupiaq language and is part of a decolonization process.

Another recorded Iñupiaq name is Ukpiaġvik, (Note: Pronounced [ukpi.ɑʁvik].) which comes from ukpik "snowy owl" and is translated as "the place where snowy owls are hunted". A spelling variant of this name was adopted by the Ukpeaġvik Iñupiat Corporation when it was established in 1973.

== History ==
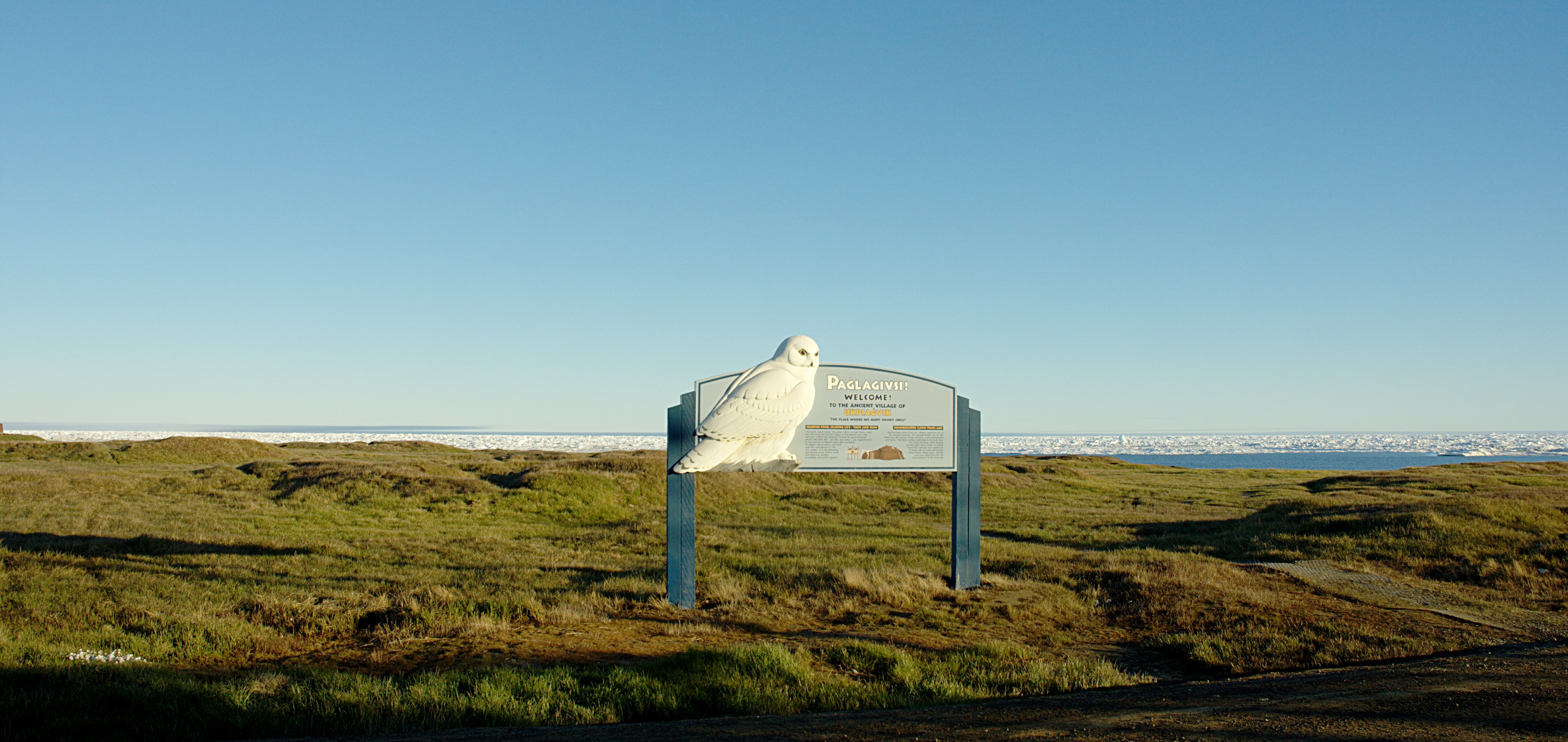
The Ukpeakvik mounds are the site of ancient sod houses in Utqiagvik.

=== Prehistory to the 20th century ===
Archaeological sites in the area indicate the Iñupiat lived around Utqiagvik as far back as 500 AD. Remains of 16 sod dwelling mounds, from the Birnirk culture of about 800 AD, can be seen on the shore of the Arctic Ocean. Located on a slight rise above the high-water mark, they risk being lost to erosion.

Bill Streever, who chairs the North Slope Science Initiative's Science Technical Advisory Panel, wrote in his 2009 book Cold: Adventures in the World's Frozen Places:

Barrow, like most communities in Alaska, looks temporary, like a pioneer settlement. It is not. Barrow is among the oldest permanent settlements in the United States. Hundreds of years before the European Arctic explorers showed up... Barrow was more or less where it is now, a natural hunting place at the base of a peninsula that pokes out into the Beaufort Sea... Yankee whalers sailed here, learning about the bowhead whale from Iñupiat hunters... Later, the military came, setting up a radar station, and in 1947 a science center was founded at Barrow.

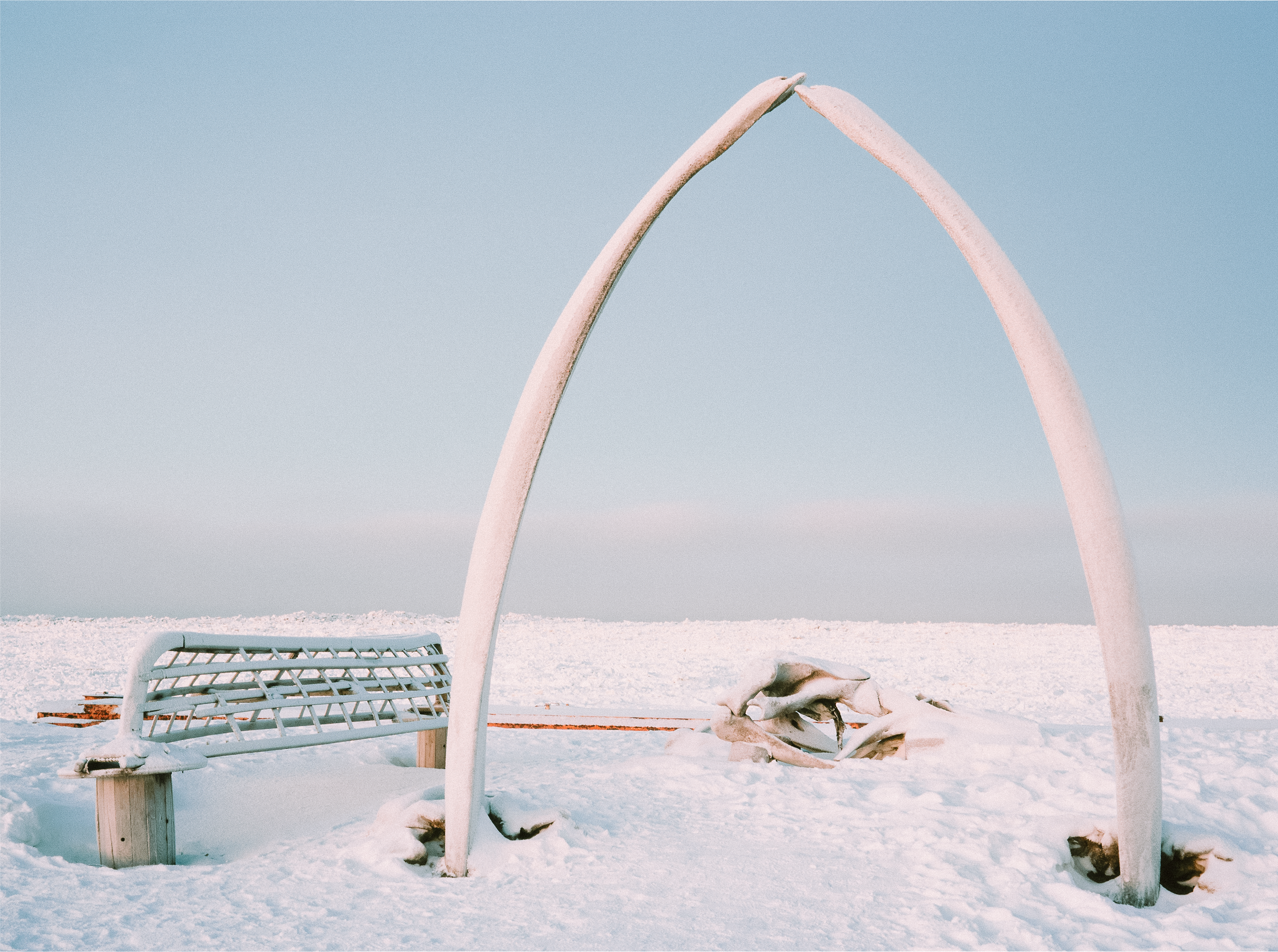
Whalebone arch in Utqiagvik. Whales were a subsistence resource in the region, and whalers would return to this arch near the waterfront when returning from hunts.

British Royal Navy officers came to the area to explore and map the Arctic coastline of North America. The U.S. acquired Alaska in 1867 by purchasing it from Russia. The United States Army established a meteorological and magnetic research station at Utqiagvik in 1881.

In 1888, a Presbyterian church was built by United States missionaries at Utqiagvik. The church is still in use today. In 1889, a whaling supply and rescue station was built. It is the oldest wood-frame building in Utqiagvik and is listed on the National Register of Historic Places. The rescue station was converted in 1896 for use as the retail Cape Smythe Whaling and Trading Station. In the late 20th century, the building was used as Brower's Cafe.

The Cape Smythe Whaling and Trading Company was managed by Charles D. Brower, a whaler and trader who became a prominent early non-Iñupiat resident of the Point Barrow area.

=== 20th century to the present ===
A United States Post Office was opened in 1901.

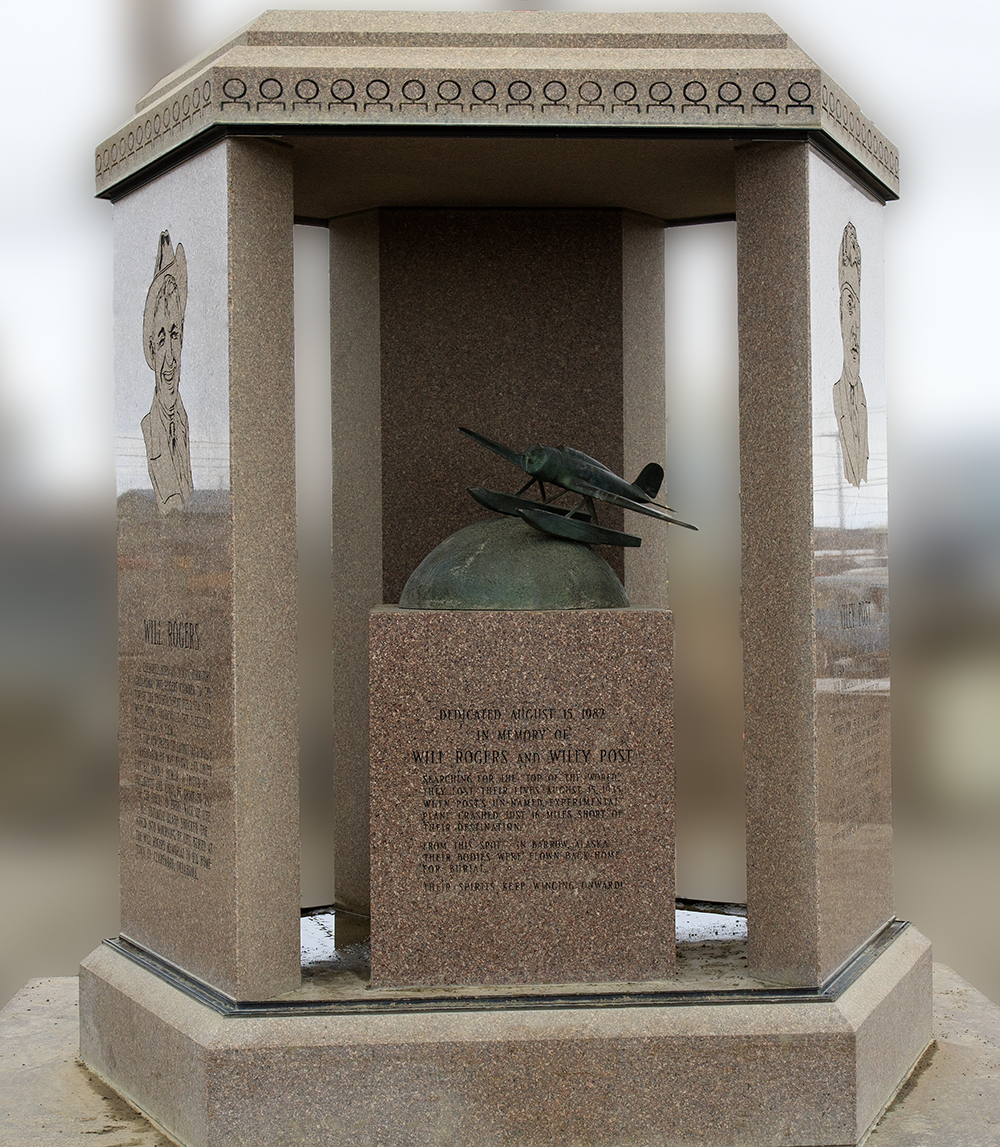
Will Rogers–Wiley Post Memorial

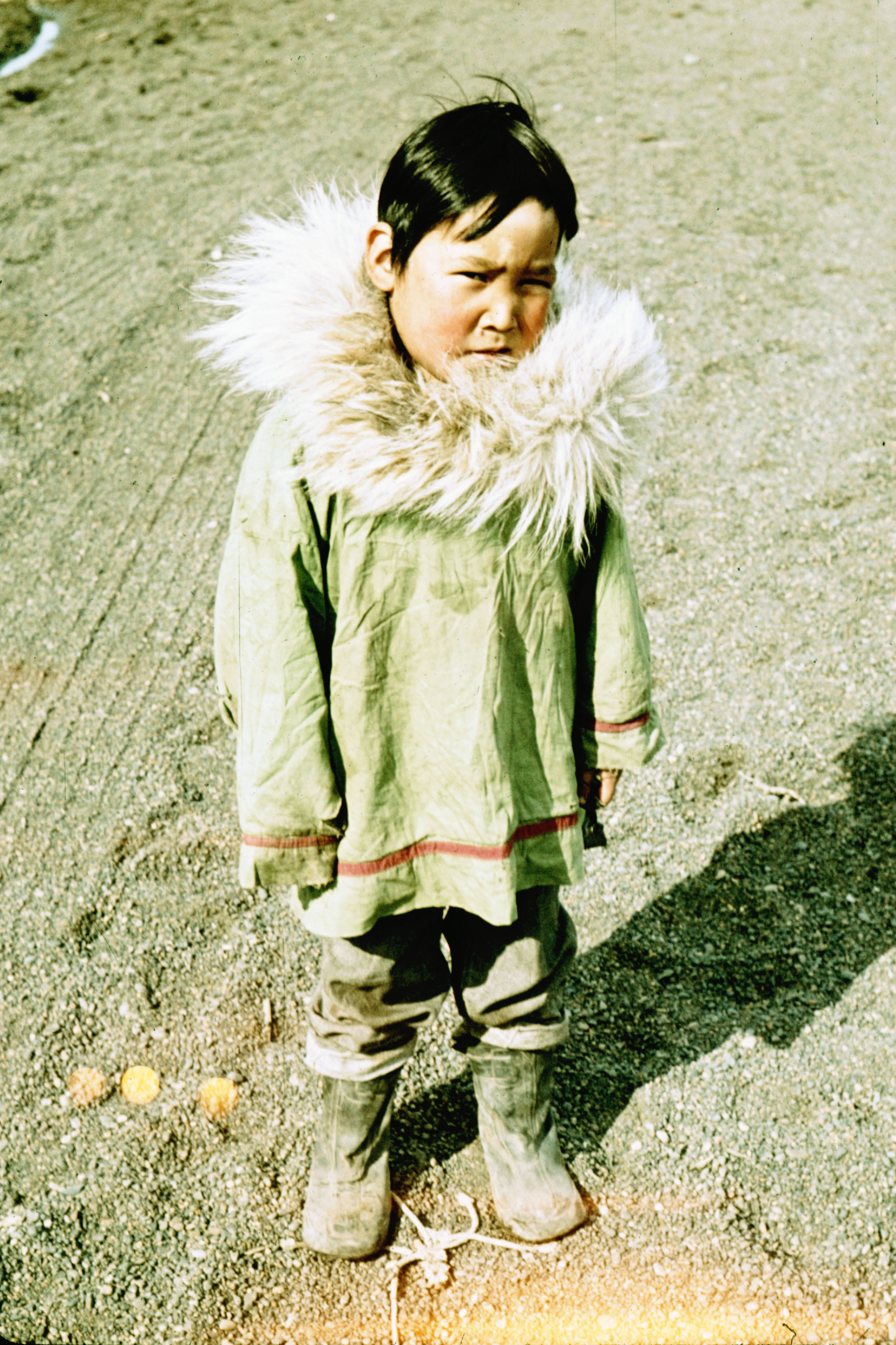
Iñupiaq child at Point Barrow c. 1960s

In 1935, famous humorist Will Rogers and pilot Wiley Post made an unplanned stop at Walakpa Bay, 15 mi (24 km) south of Utqiagvik, en route to the city. As they took off again, their plane stalled and plunged into a river, killing them both. Two memorials have been erected at the location, now called the Rogers–Post Site. Another memorial is located in Utqiagvik, where the airport was renamed the Wiley Post–Will Rogers Memorial Airport in their honor.

In 1940, the Indigenous Iñupiat organized as the Native Village of Barrow Iñupiat Traditional Government (previously, Native Village of Barrow), a federally recognized Alaska Native Iñupiat "tribal entity" as listed by the U.S. Bureau of Indian Affairs around 2003. They wrote a constitution and by-laws under the provisions of the Indian Reorganization Act (IRA) of 1934. An IRA corporation was also created.

Utqiagvik was incorporated as a first-class city under the name Barrow in 1958. Natural gas lines were brought to the town in 1965, eliminating the need for traditional heating sources such as whale blubber.

The Barrow Duck-In was a civil disobedience event that occurred in the spring of 1961. During the Duck-in, the Iñupiat protested a federal hunting ban on ducks, which threatened their livelihood and access to food security.

The residents of the North Slope were the only Native people to vote on the acceptance of the Alaska Native Claims Settlement Act; they rejected it. The Act was passed in December 1971 and, despite their opposition, became law. The Ukpeaġvik Iñupiat Corporation is a for-profit village corporation established under the Act.

In 1972, the North Slope Borough was established. The borough has built sanitation facilities, water and electrical utilities, roads, and fire departments, and has established health and educational services in Utqiagvik and the villages of the North Slope with millions of dollars in new revenues from the settlement and later oil revenues.

In 1986, the North Slope Borough created the North Slope Higher Education Center. Renamed Iḷisaġvik College, it is an accredited two-year college providing education based on the Iñupiat culture and the needs of the North Slope Borough.

The Tuzzy Consortium Library, in the Iñupiat Heritage Center, serves the communities of the North Slope Borough and functions as the academic library for Iḷisaġvik College. It was named after Evelyn Tuzroyluk Higbee, an influential community leader.

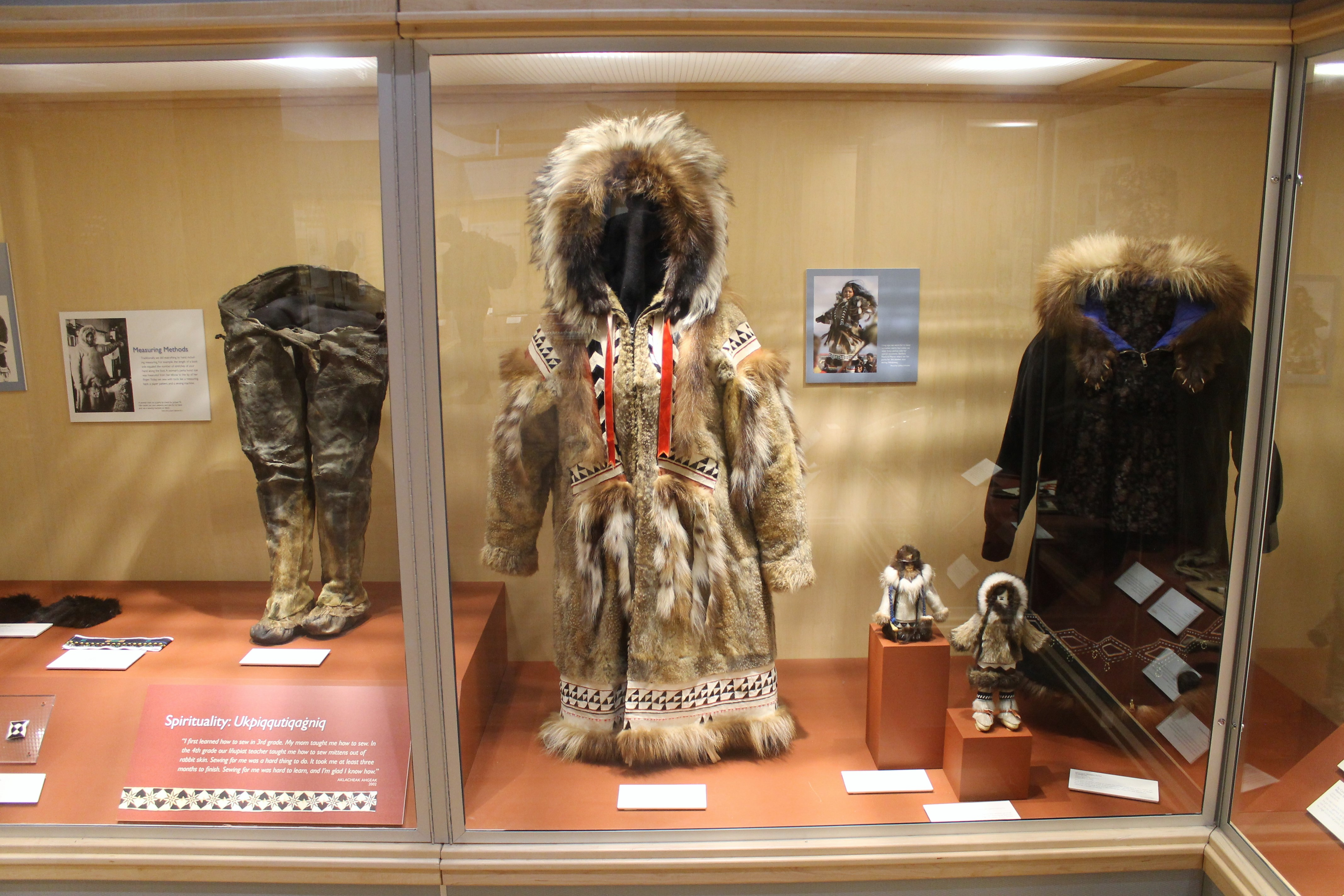
Traditional clothing at Iñupiat Heritage Center in Utqiagvik

Utqiagvik, like many communities in Alaska, has enacted a "damp" law prohibiting the sale of alcoholic beverages. However, the import, possession, and consumption of such beverages are still allowed. In 1994, residents voted to also ban the import and possession of alcohol; this was repealed the following year.

In 1988, Utqiagvik became the center of worldwide media attention when three California gray whales became trapped in the ice offshore. After a two-week rescue effort (Operation Breakthrough), a Soviet icebreaker freed two of the whales. Journalist Tom Rose details the rescue, and the media frenzy that accompanied it, in his 1989 book Freeing The Whales. The movie Big Miracle is based on the rescue and was released on February 3, 2012.

== Geography ==
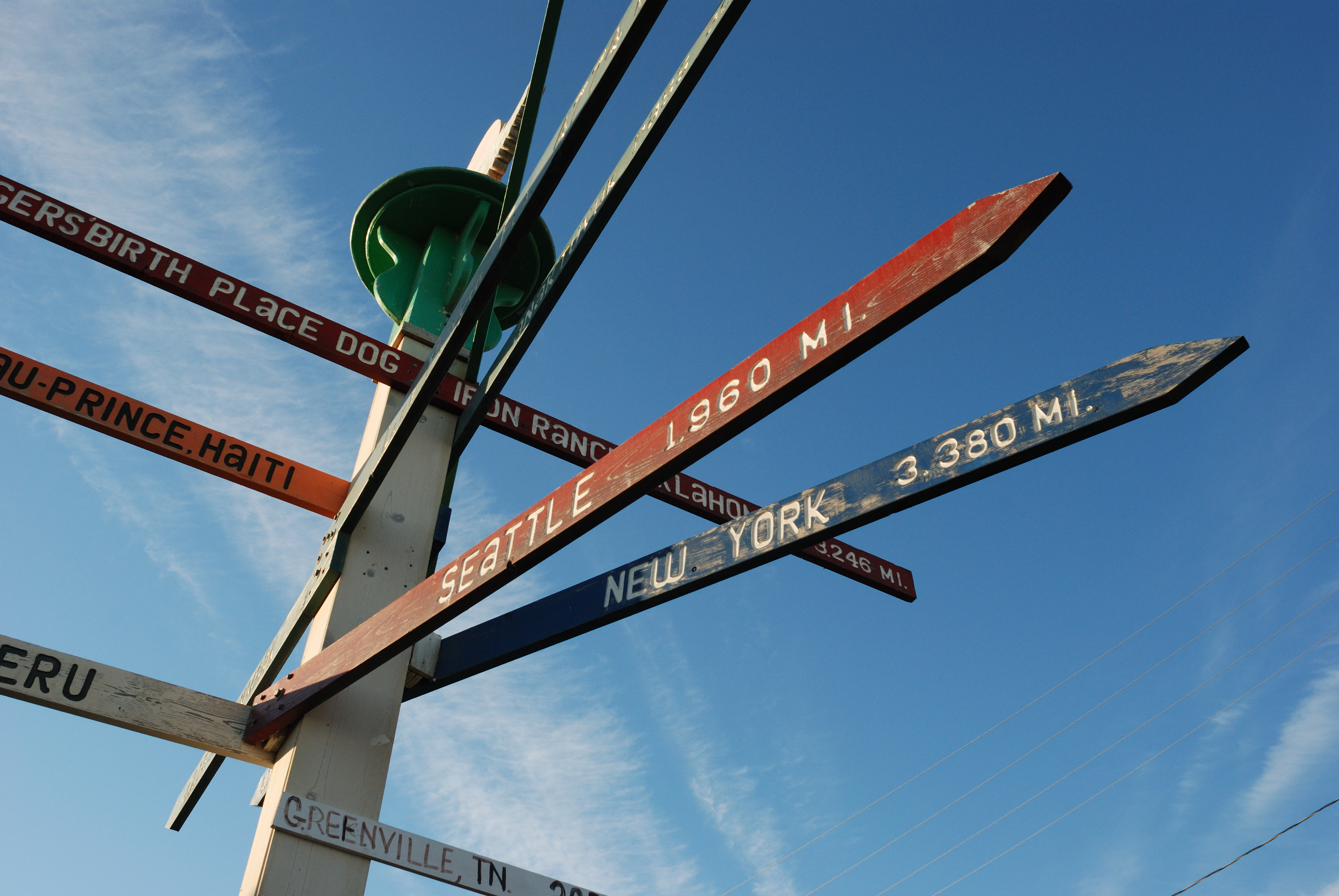
Utqiagvik Milepost

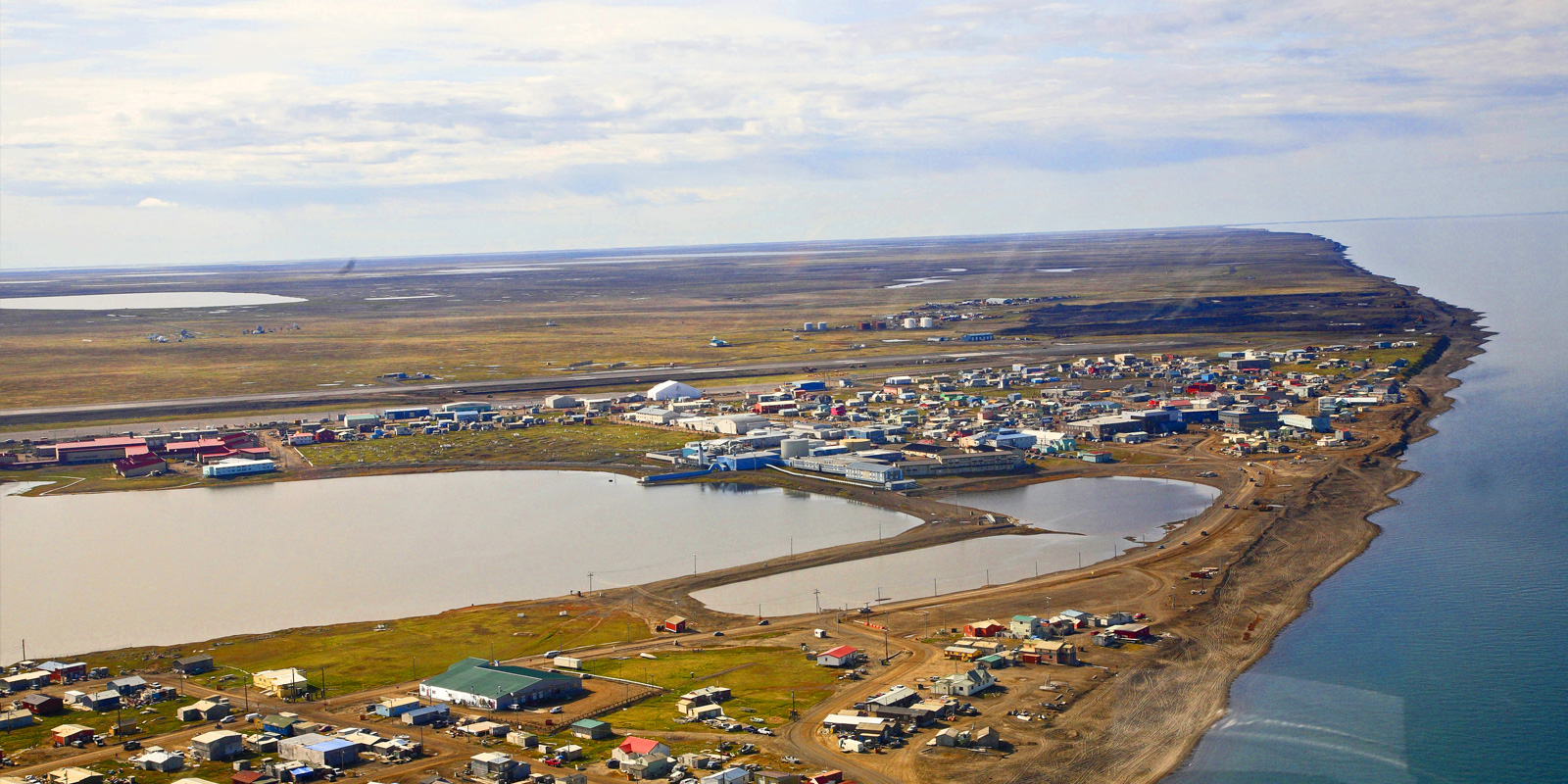
Aerial photograph of Utqiagvik

Utqiagvik is roughly 1,300 mi (2,100 km) south of the North Pole. Only 2.6% of the Earth's surface lies as far or farther north from the equator as Utqiagvik.

According to the United States Census Bureau, the city has a total area of 21 sq mi (54 km^{2}), of which 3 sq mi (7.8 km^{2}) are covered by water (14% of the total area). The predominant land type in Utqiagvik is tundra, which is formed over a permafrost layer that is as deep as 1,300 ft (400 m).

Utqiagvik is surrounded by the National Petroleum Reserve–Alaska.

The city of Utqiagvik has three sections, which can be classified as south, central, and north. They are known to residents as Utqiagvik, Browerville, and NARL, respectively.

- The southernmost section, known historically as the "Barrow side", is the oldest and second-largest of the three; it serves as downtown. This area includes Wiley Post–Will Rogers Memorial Airport, Barrow High School, North Slope Borough School District, and Fred Ipalook Elementary School, as well as restaurants, hotels, the police station, the Utqiagvik City Hall, a Wells Fargo bank branch, and numerous houses.

- The central section is the largest of the three and is called Browerville. This has traditionally been a residential area for the City of Utqiagvik, but many businesses have opened or moved into this area in recent years. Browerville is separated from the south section by a series of lagoons, with two connecting dirt roads. In addition to houses, this area includes Tuzzy Consortium Library, the U.S. Post Office, Eben Hopson Middle School, Samuel Simmonds Memorial Hospital, the Iñupiat Heritage Center, two grocery stores, one hotel, and two restaurants.
- The north section, the smallest and most isolated of the three, is known to residents as NARL because it was originally the site of the Naval Arctic Research Lab (NARL). It is only connected to the central section by Stevenson Street, a two-lane dirt road. The federal government transferred the NARL facility to the North Slope Borough, which adopted it as Iḷisaġvik College. This area also includes a small broadcasting station, run by the college students.

An ancient 5.0 mi (8 km)-sized crater, Avak, is situated near Utqiagvik.

=== Climate ===
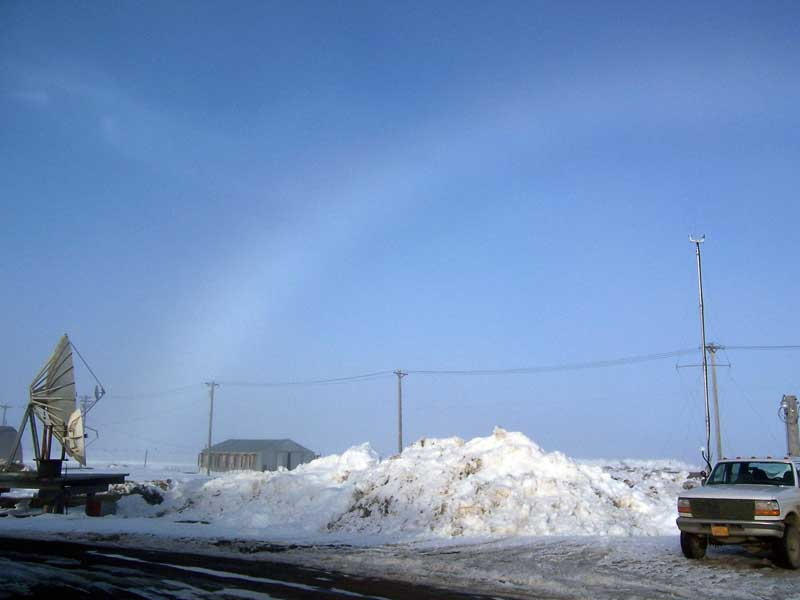
Probable fogbow in Utqiagvik

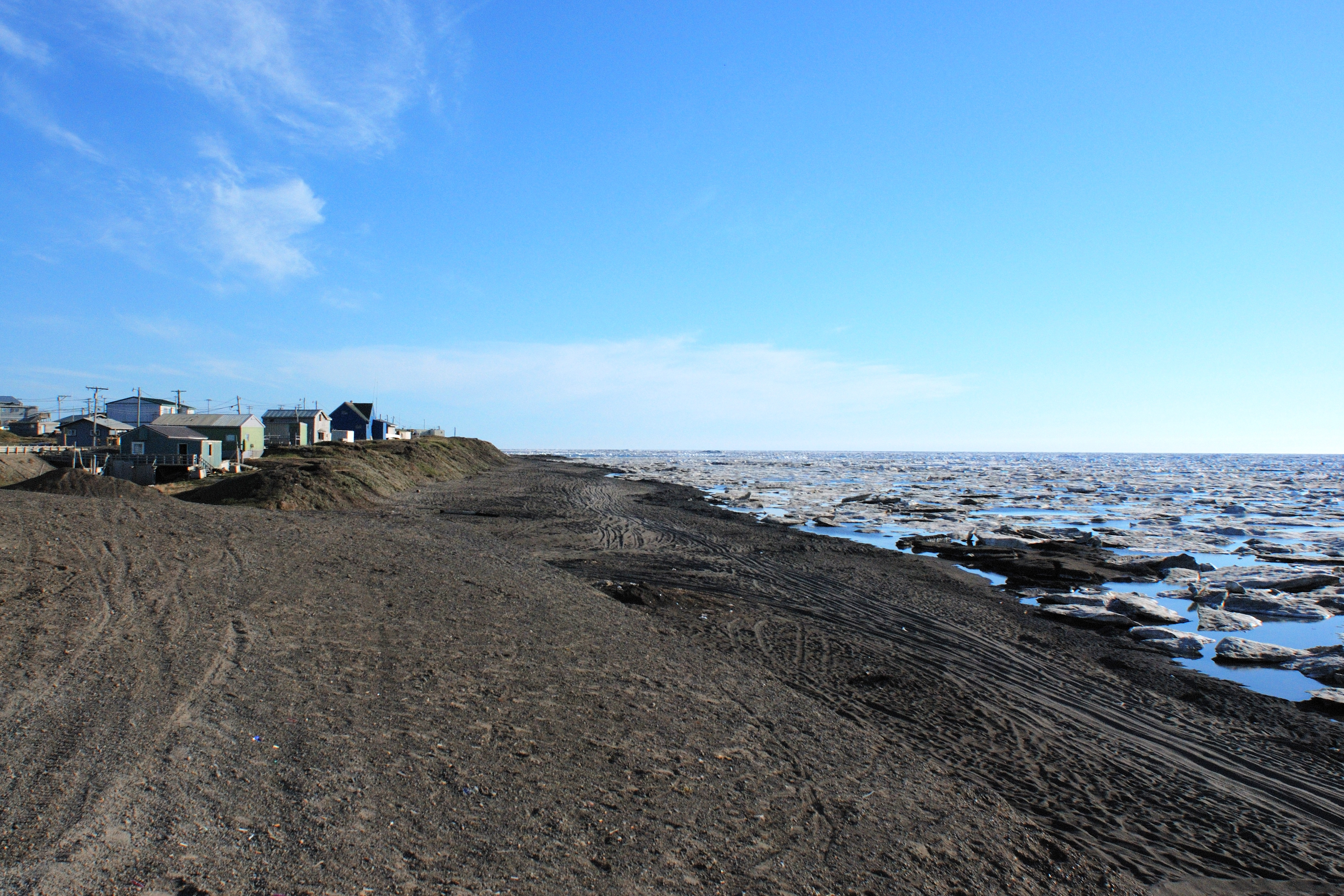
Homes along the Arctic Ocean in Utqiagvik

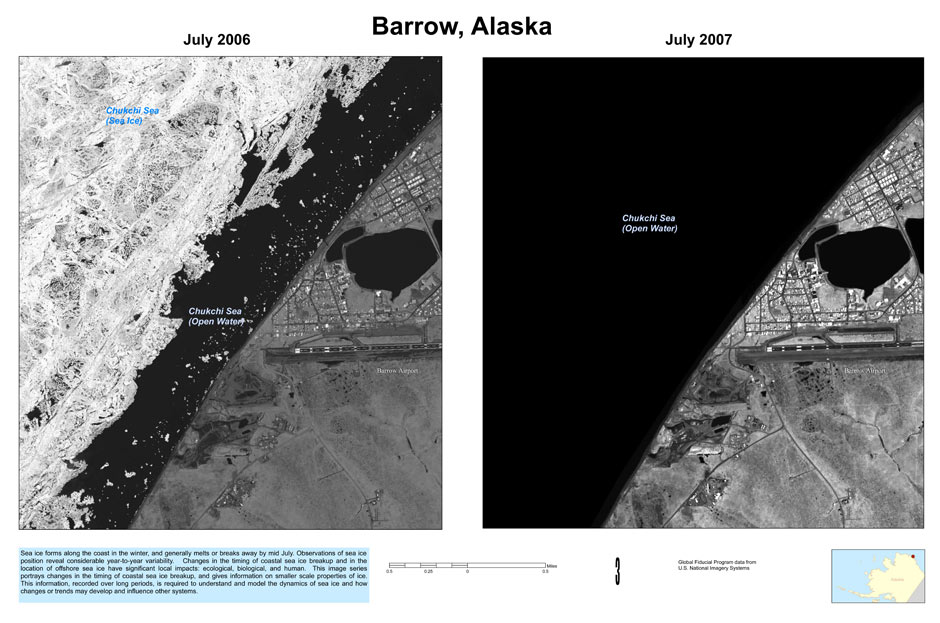
Utqiagvik sea ice, July 2006, 2007

Owing to its location 330 mi (530 km) north of the Arctic Circle, Utqiagvik's climate is cold and dry, classified as a tundra climate (Köppen ET). Winter weather can be hazardous because of the combination of cold and wind, while summers are cool even at their warmest. Weather observation records are available for Utqiagvik, dating back to the late 19th century. The National Oceanic and Atmospheric Administration (NOAA) Climate Monitoring Lab operates in Utqiagvik. The United States Department of Energy has a climate observation site in Utqiagvik as part of its Atmospheric Radiation Measurement Climate Research Facility.

Despite the extreme northern location, temperatures at Utqiagvik are moderated by the surrounding topography. The Arctic Ocean is on three sides, and flat tundra stretches some 200 mi (320 km) to the south. No wind barriers or protected valleys exist where dense cold air can settle or form temperature inversions in the lower atmosphere, as commonly happens in the interior between the Brooks and the Alaska ranges.

Utqiagvik has the lowest average temperatures of cities in Alaska. Although Utqiagvik rarely records the lowest temperatures statewide during cold waves, extremely low wind chill and "white out" conditions from blowing snow are prevalent. Temperatures usually remain below freezing (32 °F or 0 °C) from early October through late May, and below 0 °F (−18 °C) from December through March. Rarely in winter there can be a brief thaw, but continuous sub-freezing temperatures for many months at a time are the rule. For example, in 2025 Utqiagvik had a thaw on January 24 but the year's second day above freezing did not come until June 6. In 2026, the year's first above-freezing temperature was recorded on June 2.

The high temperature reaches or tops the freezing point on an average of only 136 days per year, and 92 days have a maximum at or below 0 °F (−18 °C). Freezing temperatures and snowfall can occur during any month of the year.

As of 2023, Utqiagvik falls within USDA Hardiness Zone 2B.

Regarding precipitation, Utqiagvik has a desert climate and averages less than 6 in (150 mm) "rainfall equivalent" per year. One inch of rain has an estimated water content equal to 12 in (30 cm) of snow. According to 1981−2010 normals, this includes 37 in (94 cm) of snow, compared to 99 in (250 cm) for Kuujjuaq in Nunavik, Quebec, or 87 in (220 cm) and 69 in (180 cm) for much warmer Juneau and Kodiak, Alaska, respectively. Even Sable Island, at around 44 degrees latitude and under the influence of the Gulf Stream, received 44 in (110 cm), or 20 percent more snowfall than Utqiagvik. Snowfall in Utqiagvik has increased in recent years, with an average annual snowfall of 46 in (120 cm) according to the more recent 1991–2020 normals.

The annual first snow (defined as snow that will not melt until the next spring) generally falls during the first week of October, when temperatures cease to rise above freezing during the day. October is usually the month with the heaviest snowfall, with measurable amounts occurring on over half the days and a 1991−2020 normal total accumulation of 10.3 in (26 cm). Sunlight is around 6 hours per day by the end of October.

When the sun sets on November 18, it stays below the horizon until January 23, resulting in a polar night that lasts about 66 days. When the polar night starts, about 6 hours of civil twilight occur, with the amount decreasing each day during the first half of the polar night. On the winter solstice (around December 21 or December 22), civil twilight in Utqiagvik lasts 3 hours. After this, the amount of civil twilight increases each day to around 6 hours at the end of the polar night.

Particularly cold weather usually begins in January, and February is generally the coldest month, averaging −11.9 °F (−24.4 °C). By March 1, the sun is up for 9 hours, and temperatures begin to warm, although winds are usually higher. Starting on March 23, astronomical night ceases to occur, with only daylight and twilight until the start of the midnight sun in May. This is also true from the end of the midnight sun at the beginning of August until September 22. April brings less extreme temperatures, with an average of 4.0 °F (−15.6 °C), and on April 1, the sun is up for more than 14 hours. By May 1, the sun is up for 19 hours, and by May 10 or 11 (depending on the year's relationship to the nearest leap year), the sun stays above the horizon for the entire day. This phenomenon is known as the midnight sun. The sun does not set for 83 days, until August 1 or 2 (again, depending on the year's relationship to the nearest leap year). In May, temperatures are much warmer, averaging 22.7 °F (−5.2 °C). On June 6, the daily mean temperature rises above freezing, and the normal daily mean temperature remains above freezing until September 21.

Climate chart for Utqiagvik

July is the year's warmest month, with an average temperature of 41.7 °F (5.4 °C). Beginning in mid-July, the Arctic Ocean is relatively ice-free until late October. The highest temperature recorded in Utqiagvik was 79 °F (26 °C) on July 13, 1993, while the lowest was −56 °F (−49 °C) on February 3, 1924; the highest minimum was 56 °F (13 °C) on August 5, 2023, while the lowest maximum was −47 °F (−44 °C) on January 3, 1975. On average, during the 1991 to 2020 reference period, the coldest winter maximum was −29 °F (−34 °C) and the warmest summer minimum was 47 °F (8 °C). Utqiagvik records an average 26 days per year where the high reaches at least 50 °F (10 °C). Temperatures above 60 °F (16 °C) are rare but have been recorded in most years. Even in July and August, the low falls to or below the freezing mark on an average of 18 days.

In addition to its low temperatures and polar night, Utqiagvik is one of the cloudiest places on Earth. Owing to the prevailing easterly winds off the Arctic Ocean, it is completely overcast slightly more than 50% of the year. It is at least 70% overcast around 62% of the time. Cloud types are mainly low stratus and fog; cumuli forms are rare. Peak cloudiness occurs in August and September when the ocean is ice-free. Dense fog occurs an average of 65 days yearly, mostly in summer. Ice fog is very common during the winter months, especially when the temperature drops below −30 °F (−34 °C).

Wind speed variation during the year is limited, with the fall days being windiest. Extreme winds from 40 to 60 mph (64 to 97 km/h) have been recorded every month. Winds average 12 mph (19 km/h) and are typically from the east.

Climate data for Utqiagvik, Alaska (Wiley Post–Will Rogers Memorial Airport, 1991–2020 normals, (Note: Mean monthly maxima and minima (i.e., the highest and lowest temperature readings during an entire month or year) calculated based on data at said location from 1991 to 2020.) extremes 1901–present)
Month	Jan	Feb	Mar	Apr	May	Jun	Jul	Aug	Sep	Oct	Nov	Dec	Year
Record high °F (°C)	36 (2)	36 (2)	34 (1)	42 (6)	47 (8)	73 (23)	79 (26)	76 (24)	62 (17)	44 (7)	39 (4)	40 (4)	79 (26)
Mean maximum °F (°C)	19.4 (−7.0)	17.3 (−8.2)	17.2 (−8.2)	28.1 (−2.2)	38.2 (3.4)	59.5 (15.3)	65.2 (18.4)	60.6 (15.9)	51.1 (10.6)	35.6 (2.0)	28.9 (−1.7)	20.3 (−6.5)	67.2 (19.6)
Mean daily maximum °F (°C)	−5.2 (−20.7)	−5.5 (−20.8)	−3.8 (−19.9)	10.6 (−11.9)	26.9 (−2.8)	40.9 (4.9)	47.7 (8.7)	44.5 (6.9)	37.1 (2.8)	25.6 (−3.6)	11.5 (−11.4)	−0.4 (−18.0)	19.2 (−7.1)
Daily mean °F (°C)	−11.5 (−24.2)	−11.9 (−24.4)	−10.5 (−23.6)	4.0 (−15.6)	22.7 (−5.2)	36.0 (2.2)	41.7 (5.4)	39.8 (4.3)	33.7 (0.9)	21.2 (−6.0)	5.7 (−14.6)	−6.3 (−21.3)	13.7 (−10.2)
Mean daily minimum °F (°C)	−17.8 (−27.7)	−18.3 (−27.9)	−17.2 (−27.3)	−2.5 (−19.2)	18.5 (−7.5)	31.1 (−0.5)	35.6 (2.0)	35.1 (1.7)	30.3 (−0.9)	16.8 (−8.4)	−0.1 (−17.8)	−12.2 (−24.6)	8.3 (−13.2)
Mean minimum °F (°C)	−37.8 (−38.8)	−39.1 (−39.5)	−36.1 (−37.8)	−22.6 (−30.3)	0.1 (−17.7)	23.7 (−4.6)	29.7 (−1.3)	28.7 (−1.8)	20.2 (−6.6)	−5.0 (−20.6)	−19.9 (−28.8)	−31.5 (−35.3)	−42.7 (−41.5)
Record low °F (°C)	−53 (−47)	−56 (−49)	−52 (−47)	−42 (−41)	−19 (−28)	4 (−16)	22 (−6)	20 (−7)	1 (−17)	−32 (−36)	−40 (−40)	−55 (−48)	−56 (−49)
Average precipitation inches (mm)	0.14 (3.6)	0.21 (5.3)	0.18 (4.6)	0.18 (4.6)	0.28 (7.1)	0.43 (11)	0.98 (25)	1.09 (28)	0.77 (20)	0.54 (14)	0.37 (9.4)	0.22 (5.6)	5.39 (137)
Average snowfall inches (cm)	3.5 (8.9)	3.5 (8.9)	2.9 (7.4)	3.6 (9.1)	3.4 (8.6)	0.7 (1.8)	0.2 (0.51)	0.8 (2.0)	4.1 (10)	10.3 (26)	7.8 (20)	5.0 (13)	45.8 (116)
Average precipitation days (≥ 0.01 in)	4.8	5.5	5.1	5.3	6.3	6.3	9.7	11.5	13.6	13.5	9.7	6.7	98.0
Average snowy days (≥ 0.1 in)	7.5	7.8	7.1	8.4	7.7	2.0	0.6	2.1	8.3	17.0	13.8	10.0	92.3
Average relative humidity (%)	72.7	70.0	70.9	76.8	87.0	88.5	87.9	91.1	90.6	85.6	79.4	74.0	81.2
Average dew point °F (°C)	−19.5 (−28.6)	−24.5 (−31.4)	−21.8 (−29.9)	−7.2 (−21.8)	16.3 (−8.7)	30.7 (−0.7)	35.6 (2.0)	35.2 (1.8)	27.9 (−2.3)	10.2 (−12.1)	−6.7 (−21.5)	−17.5 (−27.5)	4.9 (−15.1)
Source: NOAA (relative humidity and dew point 1961–1990)

==== Consequences of global warming ====
The Arctic region is warming at a rate that is three times the global average, forcing major adjustments to life on the North Slope with regard to hunting and whaling practices over the prior millennium, as well as to habitation. Thinner sea ice endangers the landing of bowhead whale strikes on offshore ice by springtime whalers. Caribou habitat is also affected while thawing soil threatens homes and municipal and commercial structures. The city's infrastructure is endangered, particularly water, sanitation, power, and road stability. The shoreline is rapidly eroding and has been encroaching on buildings for decades. According to Dr. Harold Wanless of the University of Miami, an anticipated rise in sea level and consequent global warming is inevitable, meaning the existence of Utqiagvik at its current location is doomed in the relative geological short term. Smoothed data from NOAA show that Utqiagvik warmed by 4.6 °F (2.6 °C) between 1949 and 2009, with winters warming substantially more. On December 5, 2022, Utqiagvik broke its previous record for the warmest winter temperature, hitting 40 °F (4 °C).

== Demographics ==
Historical population
Census	Pop.	Note	%±
1880	225		—
1890	246		9.3%
1900	314		27.6%
1910	446		42.0%
1920	322		−27.8%
1930	330		2.5%
1940	363		10.0%
1950	951		162.0%
1960	1,314		38.2%
1970	2,104		60.1%
1980	2,207		4.9%
1990	3,469		57.2%
2000	4,581		32.1%
2010	4,212		−8.1%
2020	4,927		17.0%
U.S. Decennial Census

The town first appeared in census records in the 1880 U.S. Census as the unincorporated Inuit village of "Ootiwakh". All 225 of its residents were Inuit. In 1890, the community and area were returned as the "Cape Smythe Settlements", which included the refuge and whaling stations, Pengnok, Utkeavie, Kugaru (Inaru) River villages, four other camps, and Whaling Steamer Balaena. Of the 246 residents, 189 were Natives, 46 were White, one was Asian, and 10 were other races. This did not include nearby Point Barrow, which was a separate community. In 1900, the community reported again as "Cape Smythe Settlements". In 1910, it first reported as Barrow and did so in every successive census to 2010. The community formally incorporated in 1959. The native name Utqiagvik was adopted in 2016 and was used in the 2020 census.

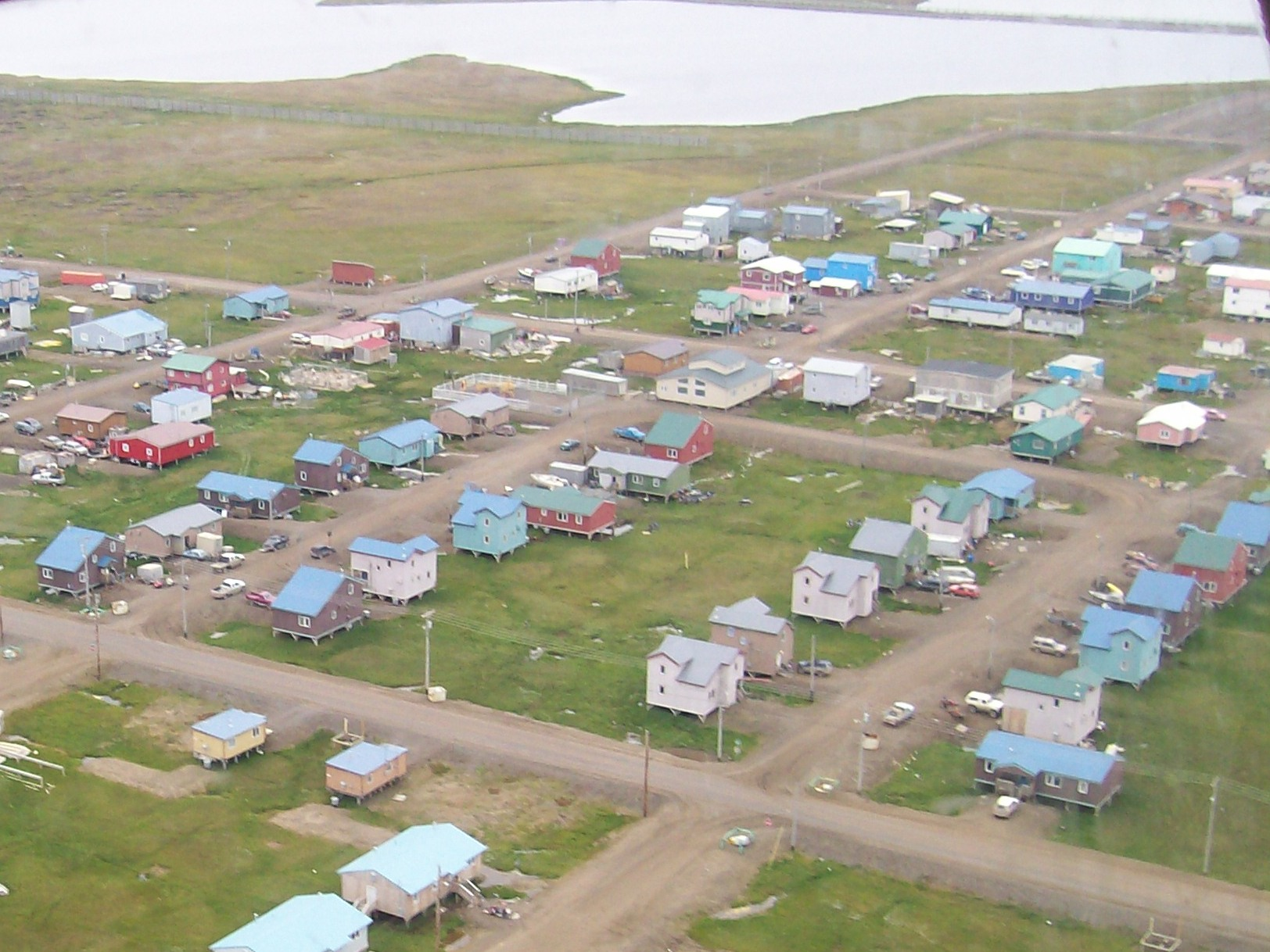
Homes built on pilings

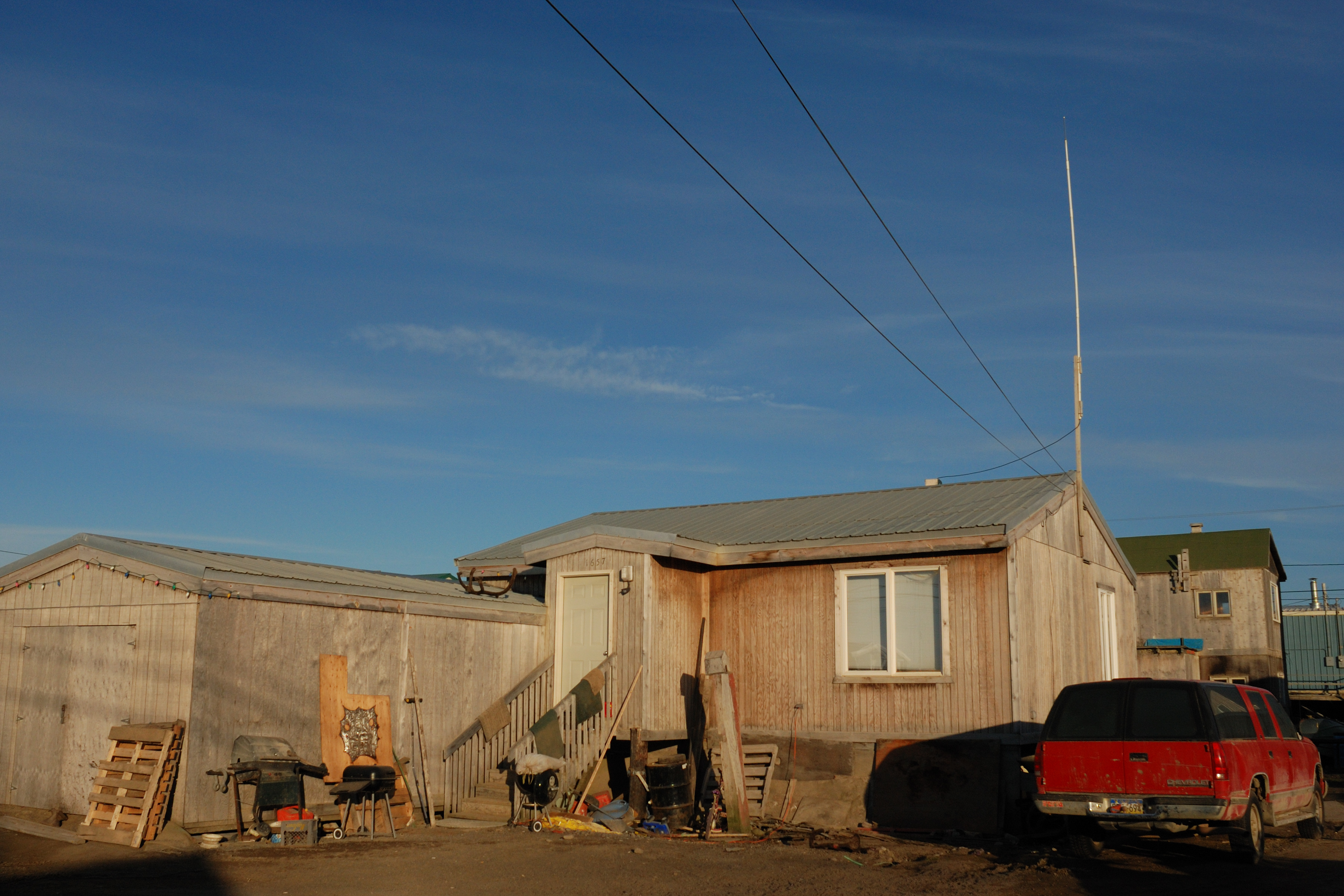
A typical home in Utqiagvik

In the 2010 United States census, 4,212 persons were reported living in the city. The city's racial makeup was 60.5% Alaskan Native, 16.2% White, 8.9% Asian, 8.1% from two or more races, 3.1% Latino, 2.3% Pacific Islander, and 0.9% African.

In the census of 2000, 4,683 persons, 1,399 households, and 976 families were reported living in the city. The population density was 249.0 inhabitants per square mile (96.1/km^{2}). There were 1,620 housing units at an average density of 88.1 per square mile (34.0/km^{2}). The racial makeup of the city was 57.2% Alaska Native, 21.8% White, 9.4% Asian, 1.0% African American, 1.4% Pacific Islander, 0.7% from other races, 8.5% from two or more races, and 3.3% Latinos.

Of the 1,399 households, 56.5% had children under 18 living with them, 45.2% were married couples living together, 14.8% had a female householder with no husband present, and 28.0% were not families. 23.0% of all households were individuals, and 1.8% had someone 65 or older living alone. The average household size was 3.35, and the average family size was 4.80.

In Utqiagvik, the age distribution was 27.7% under 18, 13.3% from 18 to 24, 31.6% from 25 to 44, 19.4% from 45 to 64, and 3.4% who were 65 or older. The median age was 29 years. For every 100 females, there were 107.1 males. For every 100 females age 18 and over, there were 109.5 males.

The median income for a household in the city was $63,094.09, and the median income for a family was $68,223. Males had a median income of $51,959 versus $46,382 for females. The per capita income for the city was $22,902. About 7.7% of families and 8.6% of the population were below the poverty line, including 7.2% of those under 18 and 13.1% of those 65 and older.

As of December 2022, the city's website says: "The largest city in the North Slope Borough, Utqiagvik, has 4,429 residents, of which approximately 61% are Iñupiat Eskimo."

== Economy ==
Utqiagvik is the economic center of the North Slope Borough, the city's primary employer. Many businesses provide support services to oil field operations. State and federal agencies are employers. The midnight sun has attracted tourism, and arts and crafts offer some cash income. Because transporting food to the city is expensive, many residents continue relying on subsistence food sources. Whale, seal, polar bear, walrus, waterfowl, caribou, and fish are harvested from the coast or nearby rivers and lakes. Utqiagvik is the headquarters of the Arctic Slope Regional Corporation, one of the Alaska Native corporations set up following the Alaska Native Claims Settlement Act in 1971 to manage revenues and invest in development for their people in the region.

== Politics ==
United States presidential election results for Barrow/Utqiagvik, Alaska
Year	Republican		Democratic		Third party(ies)	
Year	No.	%	No.	%	No.	%
1960	140	38.57%	223	61.43%	0	0.00%
1964	47	11.27%	370	88.73%	0	0.00%
1968	167	36.62%	269	58.99%	20	4.39%
1972	131	28.92%	306	67.55%	16	3.53%
1976	106	26.70%	280	70.53%	11	2.77%
1980	189	43.35%	157	36.01%	90	20.64%
1984	355	59.46%	229	38.36%	13	2.18%
1988	374	51.80%	311	43.07%	37	5.12%
1992	302	35.49%	340	39.95%	209	24.56%
1996	440	41.94%	449	42.80%	160	15.25%
2000	629	58.19%	358	33.12%	94	8.70%
2004	535	57.90%	355	38.42%	34	3.68%
2008	597	51.87%	518	45.00%	36	3.13%
2012	343	30.11%	743	65.23%	53	4.65%
2016	410	36.57%	545	48.62%	166	14.81%
2020	525	49.90%	473	44.96%	54	5.13%
2024	125	50.61%	109	44.13%	13	5.26%

The city is the center of the North Slope borough and has been a swing city for presidential elections. A substantial number of third-party voters have resided there from time to time.

== Arts and culture ==
=== Special events ===
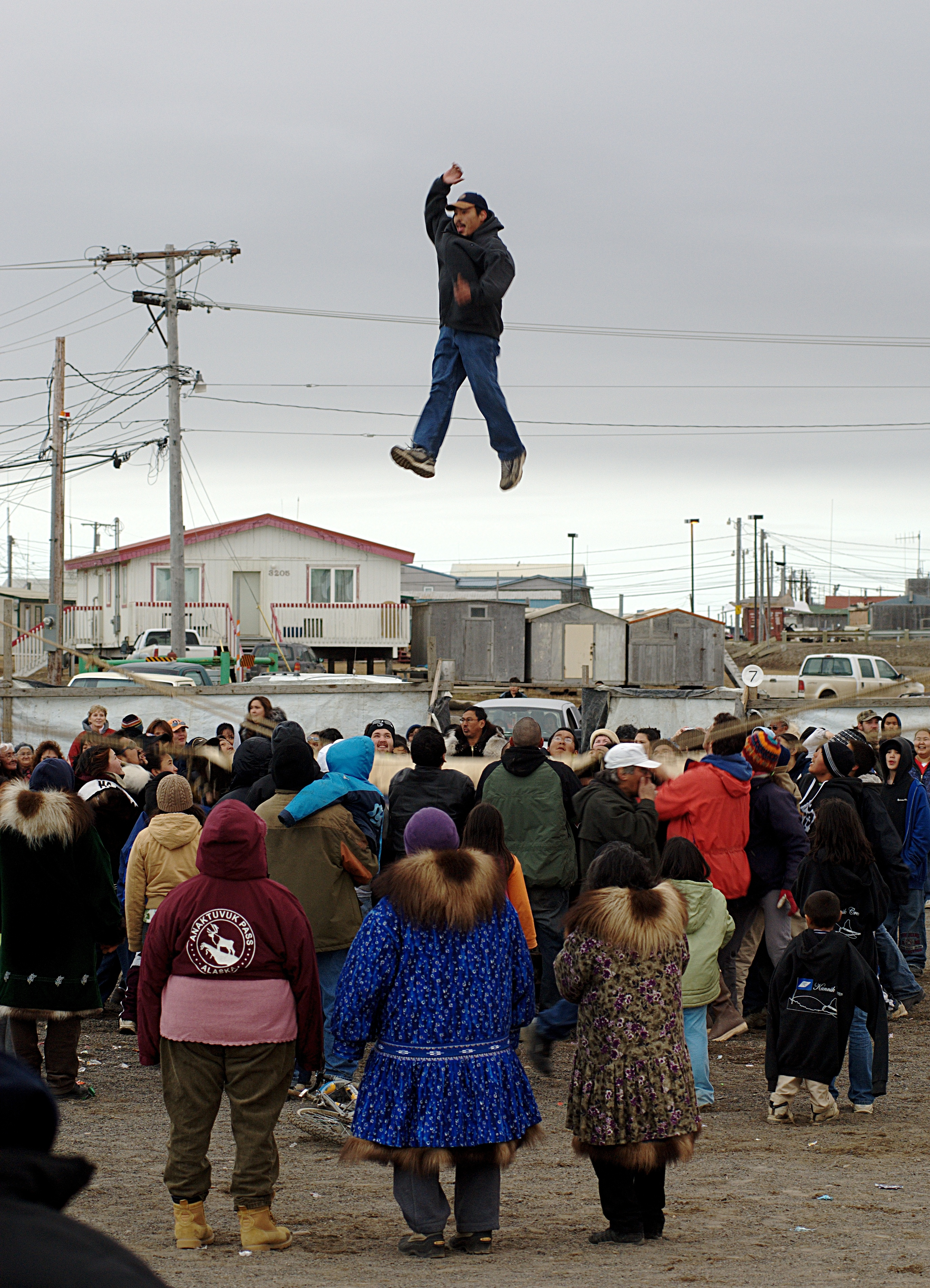
Blanket Toss during a Nalukataq in Utqiagvik

- Kivgiq, the Messenger Feast, in more recent times, has been held almost every year, but "officially" is held every two or three years in late January or early February, at the discretion of the North Slope Borough mayor. Kivgiq is an international event that attracts visitors from around the Arctic Circle.
- Piuraagiaqta, the Spring Festival, celebrates breaking a path in the ice for boats to hunt whales. Held in mid-April, it includes many outdoor activities.
- Nalukataq, the Blanket Toss Celebration, is held on multiple days beginning in the third week of June to celebrate each successful spring whale hunt.
- July 4, Independence Day, in Utqiagvik is time for Eskimo games, such as the two-foot high kick and ear pull, with the winners going on to compete at the World Eskimo Indian Olympics.
- Whaling generally happens during the second week of October.
- Qitik, Eskimo Games, also known as Christmas Games, are held from December 26 through January 1.

=== Depictions in popular culture ===
Singer-songwriter John Denver visited the town for his 1979 television special Alaska, The American Child.

The ABC TV special The Night They Saved Christmas was filmed here and first aired in December 1984.

Local restaurant owner Fran Tate was a frequent guest by telephone on a Chicago radio program, the Steve and Johnnie Show on WGN, during the 1990s. She also appeared on the Tonight Show with Johnny Carson.

The town is the setting for a series of horror comic books titled 30 Days of Night, begun in 2002. A feature feature film adaptation and straight-to-video sequel set in the town were released in 2007 and 2010.

Stephen Fry visited the town and its people during the last segment of his 2008 documentary Stephen Fry in America.

On the Ice, a 2011 film about teenagers dealing with a tragic accidental death, was filmed in the town, with locals acting in most roles.

Big Miracle, a 2012 film starring Drew Barrymore, is based on the true story of whales trapped under ice near Point Barrow, and features scenes in and characters from the town.

Karl Pilkington visits the town in the second season of An Idiot Abroad, in 2012.

In 2015, the NFL Network began an eight-part documentary series focusing on the Barrow High School Whalers football team.

The town served as the starting point for a race across the United States on Season 8 of the web travel show Jet Lag: The Game.

== Sports ==
=== Football ===
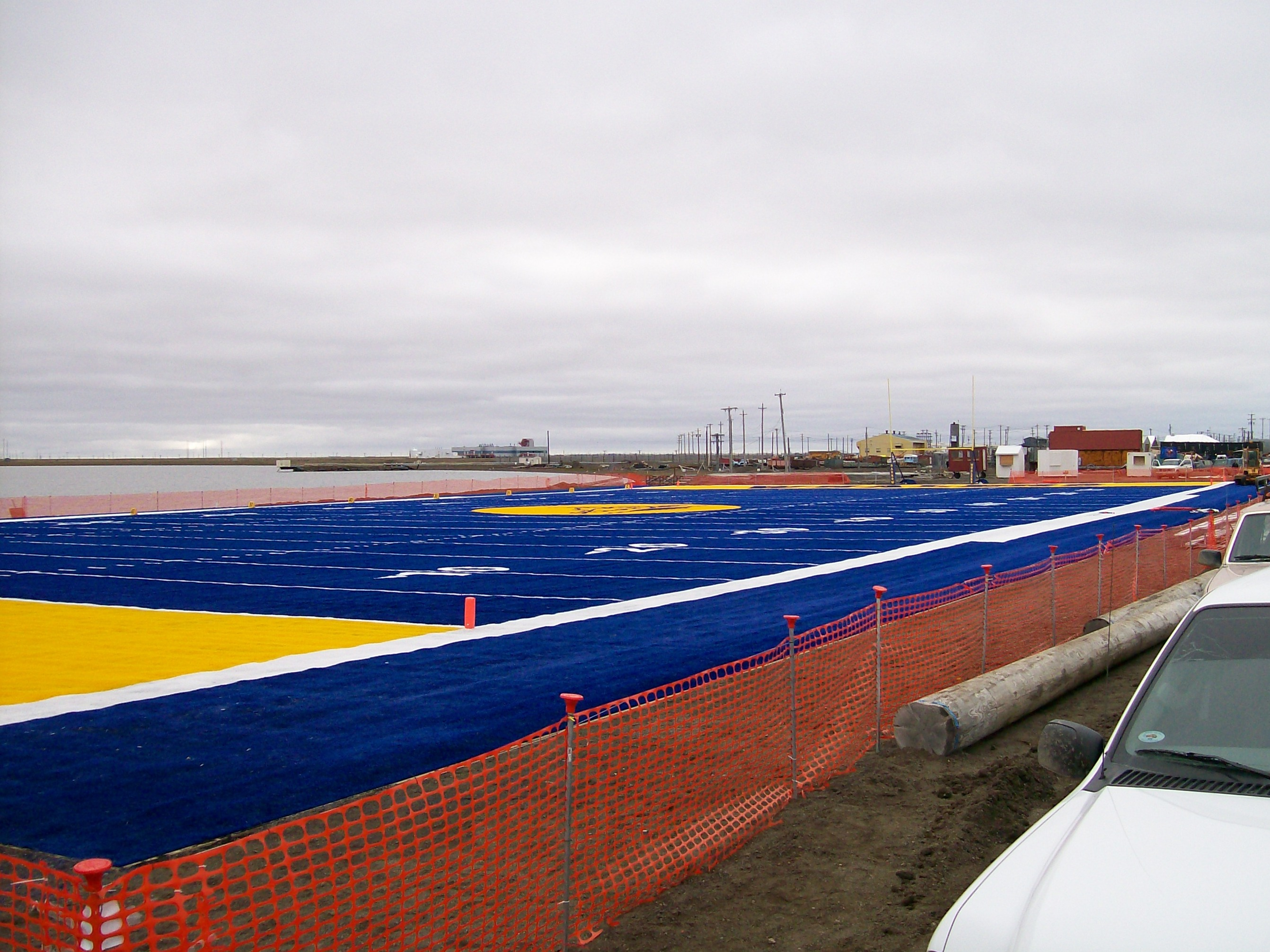
Artificial turf field for the Barrow High School's football team

On August 19, 2006, the Whalers of Barrow High School played the first official football game in the Arctic against Delta Junction High School. Barrow High School recorded its first win two weeks later; the coaches and players celebrated the historic win by jumping into the Arctic Ocean, just 100 yd (91 m) from the makeshift dirt field.

On August 17, 2007, the Whalers football team played their first game of the season on their new artificial-turf field. The historic game, which was attended by former Miami Dolphins player Larry Csonka, was the first live Internet broadcast of a sporting event in the United States from north of the Arctic Circle.

Since the team's formation, it has gathered a record of 33–24, and most recently, the team reached the semifinal round of the Alaskan State Small School Football Championship.

In 2017, the Barrow High School football team won its first-ever state championship by beating the Homer Mariners 20–14.

=== Basketball ===
In 2015, the Barrow High School boys' basketball team won the Alaska Class 3A State Championship with a 50–40 victory over two-time defending state champion Monroe Catholic. The Whalers' team was led by 5-star recruit Kamaka Hepa. As a 6'7" freshman he was regarded as one of the top basketball recruits in the country. He was ranked as the #68 basketball recruit in the country by ESPN for the class of 2018. Hepa transferred to Jefferson High School in Portland, Oregon, for his junior year. By October 2017, at 6'8" tall, he had committed to go to the University of Texas.

The Whalers' boys' basketball team finished the 2014–2015 season with a 24–3 record, the highest win percentage in school history. Guard Travis Adams was a standout as well. Coach Jeremy Arnhart's teams won 186 games in 10 seasons. In 2015, the Barrow High School girls' team also easily won the ACS tournament.

== Education ==
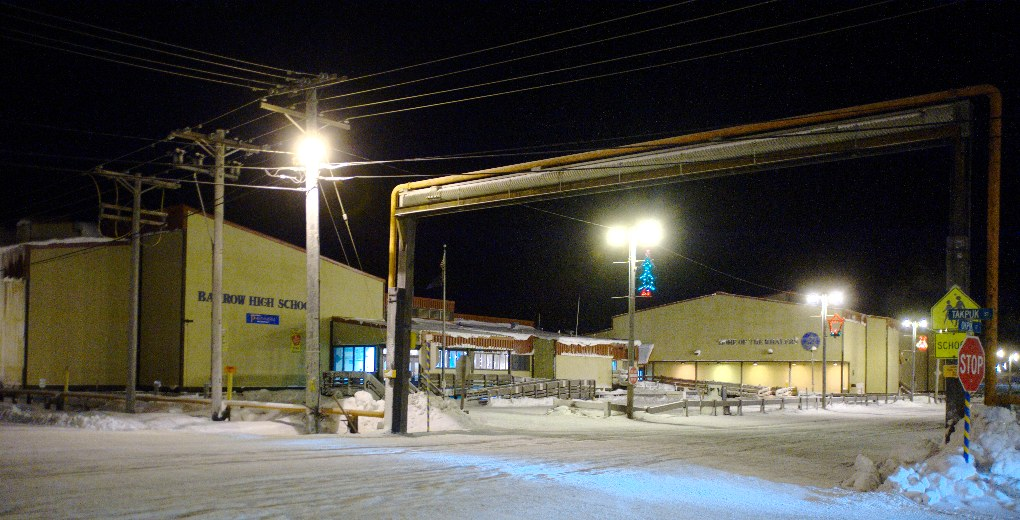
Barrow High School

Utqiagvik is served by the North Slope Borough School District. The schools serving the city are Ipalook Elementary School, Hopson Middle School, Barrow High School, and an alternative learning center known as the Kiita Learning Community.

Iḷisaġvik College, which is a two-year college and the only tribal college in Alaska, is located in Utqiagvik. The college offers various certificates and associate's degrees in accounting, allied health, business and management, construction technology, dental health therapy, Indigenous education, information technology, Iñupiaq studies, liberal arts, and office management. It also offers a bachelor's degree in business administration. The college additionally provides adult education courses for GED preparation and certificates in various programs. Local students may attend University of Alaska Fairbanks and other colleges in Alaska and other states.

== Media ==
=== Newspaper ===
The Arctic Sounder newspaper is published weekly by Alaska Media, LLC, covering news of interest to the North Slope Borough, which includes Utqiagvik, and the Northwest Arctic Borough, which provides for Kotzebue in northwestern Alaska.

=== Radio ===
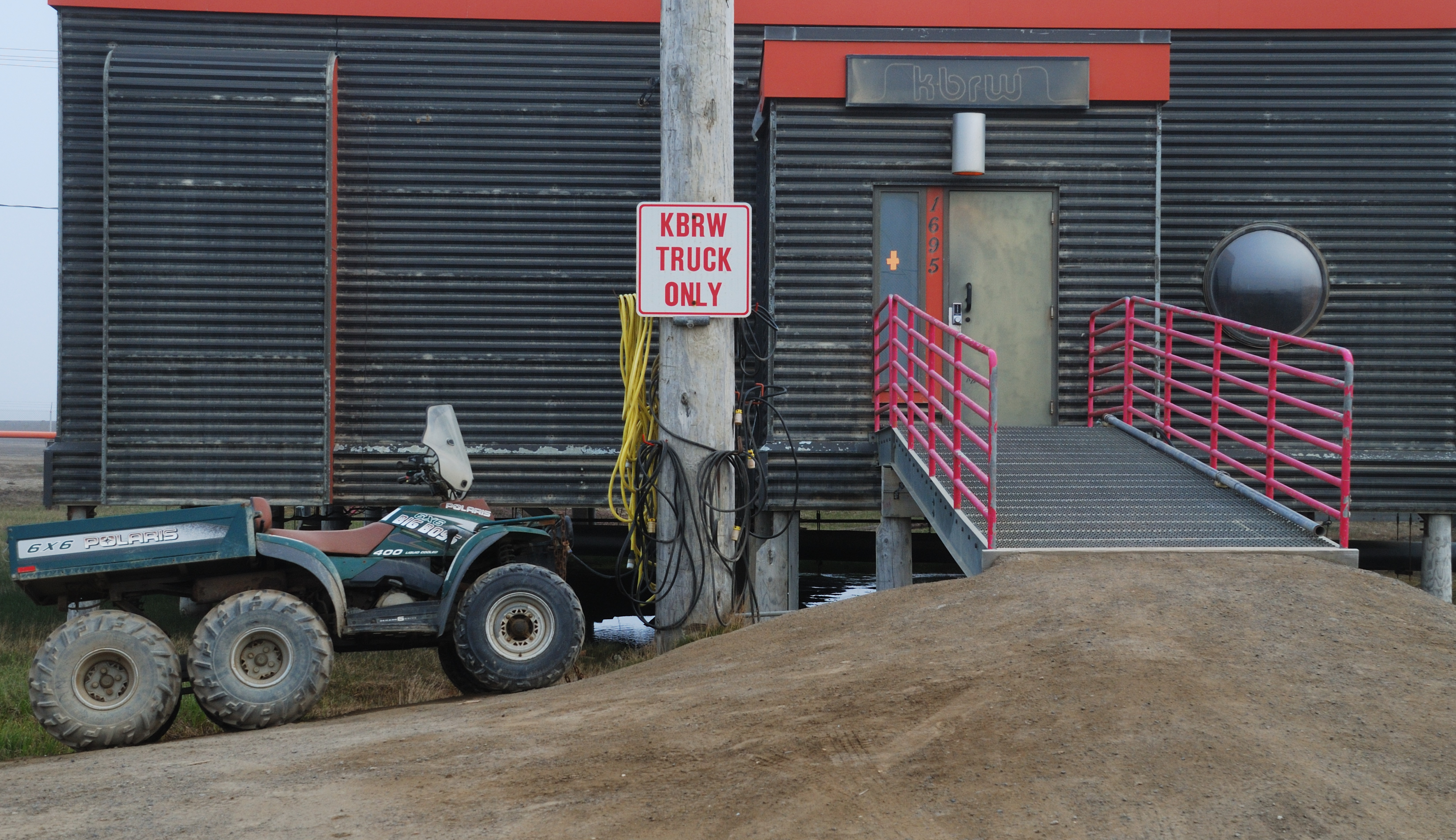
The front entrance of the KBRW studios

KBRW (AM)/KBRW-FM broadcasts in Utqiagvik on 680 kHz AM and 91.9 MHz FM. KBRW is also broadcast via FM repeaters in all of the North Slope Borough villages, from Kaktovik to Point Hope.

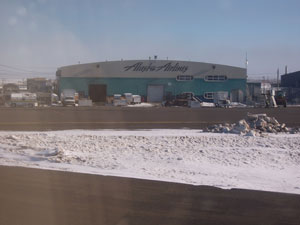
Alaska Airlines Terminal at Wiley Post–Will Rogers Memorial Airport

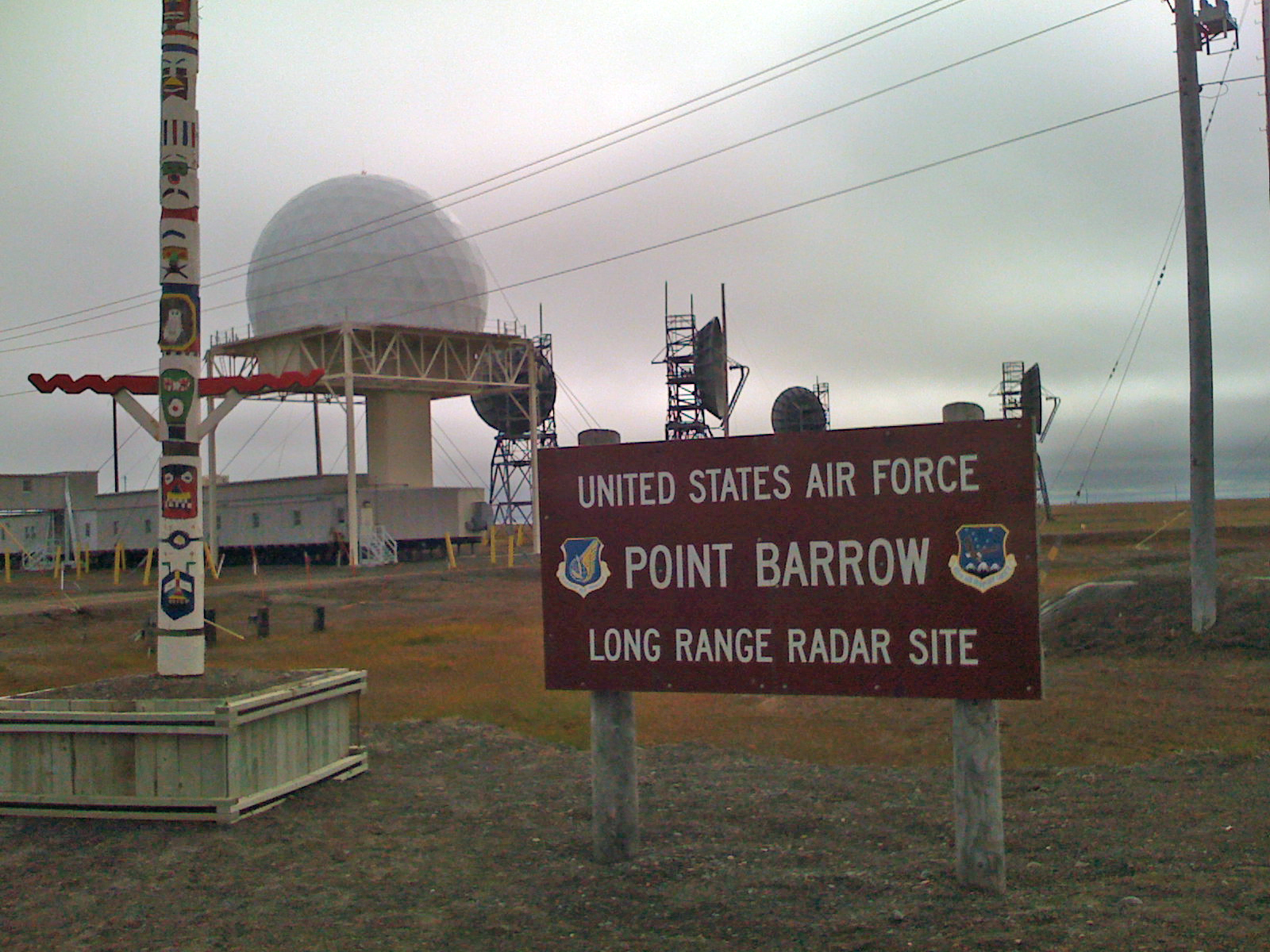
Sign and facilities of the Point Barrow Long Range Radar Site

== Infrastructure ==
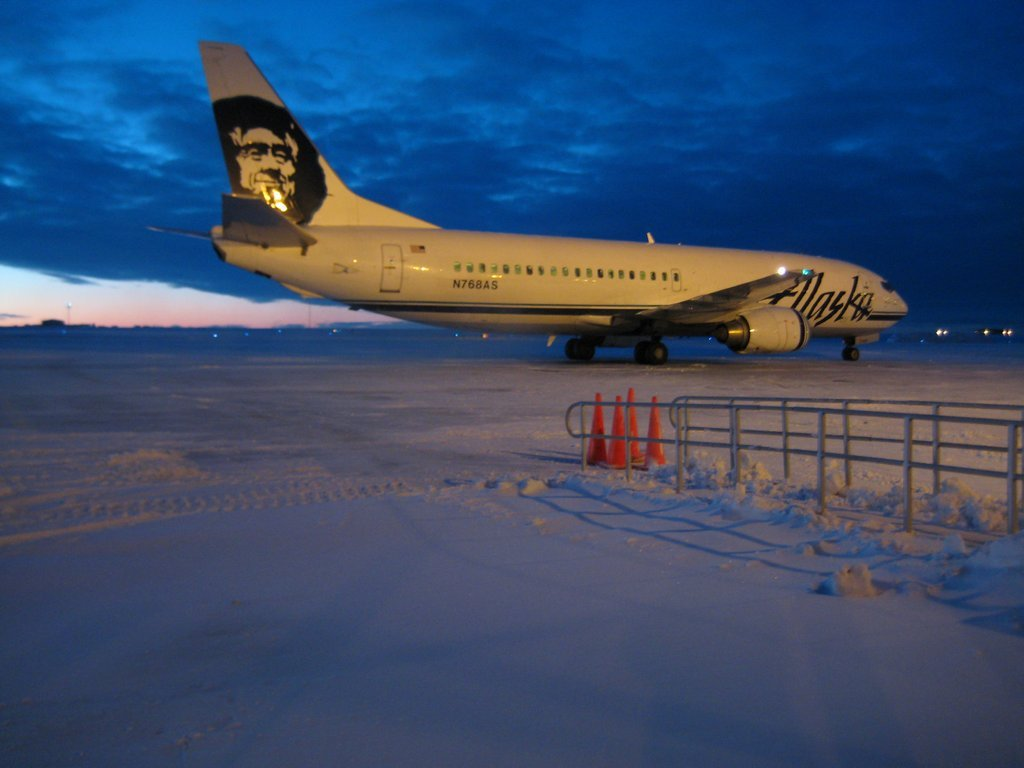
Alaska Airlines 737-400 combi aircraft at Post–Rogers Airport in December 2007. Note that it is twilight; the sun does not rise in December, but is close enough to the horizon to illuminate the sky.

=== Transportation ===
The roads in Utqiagvik are unpaved due to the permafrost. No roads connect the city to the rest of Alaska. Utqiagvik is served by Alaska Airlines with passenger jet service at the Wiley Post–Will Rogers Memorial Airport to and from Anchorage and Fairbanks. New service between Fairbanks and Anchorage began from Era Aviation on June 1, 2009. Freight arrives by air cargo year-round and by ocean-going marine barges during the annual summer sealift.

Utqiagvik is the transportation hub for the North Slope Borough's Arctic coastal villages. Multiple jet aircraft, with service from Deadhorse (Prudhoe Bay), Fairbanks, and Anchorage provide daily mail, cargo, and passenger services, which connect with smaller single- and twin-engine general aviation aircraft that provide regular service to other villages, from Kaktovik in the east to Point Hope in the west. The town is also served by several radio taxi services, most using small four-wheel drive vehicles.

=== Health care ===
Samuel Simmonds Memorial Hospital, located in the City of Utqiagvik, is the primary healthcare facility for the North Slope region of Alaska. Individuals in the city needing medical care can access the hospital by road. Because no roads lead in or out of Utqiagvik, individuals in surrounding communities and towns (including Point Hope, Prudhoe Bay, and Wainwright) must be airlifted in by plane, helicopter, or air ambulance. The facility operates continuously, and is the northernmost hospital or medical facility in the United States.

== Notable people ==
- Charles D. Brower (1863–1945), whaler, trader, and author
- Harry Brower Sr. (1924–1992), a whaling captain, community leader
- Kamaka Hepa (born 2000), college basketball player for the Texas Longhorns and Hawaii Rainbow Warriors
- Eben Hopson (1922–1980), a former member of the Alaska Senate
- Morgan Kibby (born 1984), actress, singer, songwriter
- Edna Ahgeak MacLean (born 1944), linguist, educator, and former President of Iḷisaġvik College
- Sadie Neakok (1916–2004), the first female magistrate in Alaska
- John Nusunginya (1927–1981), a former member of the Alaska House of Representatives
- Josiah Patkotak (born 1994), a former member of the Alaska House of Representatives, mayor of the North Slope Borough
- Nutaaq Simmonds, actress, activist, language teacher
- Tara Sweeney (born 1973), former Assistant Secretary for Native American affairs at the United States Department of the Interior

== See also ==
- Arctic Slope Regional Corporation
- The blob (Chukchi Sea algae)
- Native Village of Barrow Iñupiat Traditional Government
- Naval Arctic Research Laboratory
- Umiak
