= Charles D. Brower =

Arctic whaler and writer

- Born: Charles DeWitt Brower; March 6, 1863; New York City, New York, U.S.
- Died: February 11, 1945 (aged 81); Barrow, Alaska, U.S.
- Occupations: Whaler, trader, postmaster, writer
- Known for: Arctic whaling; Fifty Years Below Zero
- Spouse(s): Toctoo; Asianggataq
- Children: 14

Charles DeWitt Brower (March 6, 1863 – February 11, 1945) was an American whaler, trader, postmaster, and writer who spent most of his adult life at Point Barrow, Alaska, then commonly known as Barrow. He became involved in shore-based whaling and trading and was a long-term resident of the predominantly Iñupiat community. Dartmouth College's archival records describe him as a whaler, trader, and postmaster and note that he became known as the "King of the Arctic".

Brower is the author of Fifty Years Below Zero: A Lifetime of Adventure in the Far North, published in 1942. The memoir describes commercial whaling, Iñupiaq subsistence whaling, trade, cultural exchange, and social change in northern Alaska. Historian Jennifer Schell has examined the memoir as both an important historical source and a selective autobiographical account whose omissions require critical interpretation.

== Early life and first journey to Arctic Alaska ==
Brower was born in New York City on March 6, 1863. By his early twenties he was working as a sailor. In 1884, Josiah N. Knowles of the Pacific Steam Whaling Company asked the 21-year-old Brower to travel to Cape Lisburne on Alaska's Chukchi Sea coast. The company was interested in a recently reported coal deposit and wanted Brower to determine whether the coal could be exploited and whether a recruiting and supply station for whaling vessels could be established there.

In May 1884, Brower departed San Francisco aboard the steam schooner Beda. He spent nearly a year in Arctic Alaska before returning to California. He concluded that the instability of the ground and the remoteness of Cape Lisburne made the proposed coal operation and station impractical.

Brower returned to Alaska in 1886, this time to Point Barrow, where he became involved in establishing a shore-whaling station for the Pacific Steam Whaling Company. He subsequently made Barrow his permanent home. During his years there he learned Iñupiaq and became involved in the economic and social life of the community.

== Whaling and trading at Point Barrow ==
Brower's career coincided with a major transformation in American Arctic whaling. During the late 19th century, declining demand for whale oil was partially offset by continued demand for baleen, particularly from bowhead whales. Steam-powered vessels expanded commercial access to Arctic waters, while San Francisco became an important center of the western Arctic whaling industry.

At Barrow, Brower became involved in shore-based commercial whaling, which depended heavily on Iñupiaq labor, expertise, equipment, and knowledge of bowhead whale behavior and local sea-ice conditions. By the 1890s, Brower and his business partner Tom Gordon were operating their own whaling enterprise. Their Cape Smythe Whaling and Trading Company established a store in Barrow.

The company traded merchandise and furs in addition to participating in the whaling economy. Brower also served as Barrow's postmaster and became a regular contact for outsiders arriving in the region, including explorers, scientists, government personnel, and travelers. Dartmouth's archival description notes that visitors to Barrow frequently sought him out because of his experience and knowledge of the region.

His business remained active into his later life. In 1943, Brower entered into a formal partnership with two of his sons, Thomas and David. According to a later Alaska Supreme Court decision concerning the disposition of Brower family property, the partnership dealt in general merchandise, furs, gold, and other commodities and continued operating until Brower's death.

== Arctic whaling disaster of 1897–1898 ==
Brower played a significant role during the Arctic whaling disaster of 1897–1898, when several commercial whaling vessels became trapped or were destroyed by sea ice near Point Barrow. More than 200 whalers were forced to spend the winter in the area under precarious conditions.

According to the National Oceanic and Atmospheric Administration (NOAA), Brower's experience, hunting skills, supplies, and logistical knowledge helped sustain the stranded crews. Local Iñupiat also supplied food and other resources to the survivors. A government relief effort subsequently drove a large herd of reindeer north toward Barrow. When the relief party arrived, the stranded men were in better condition than rescuers had anticipated, in substantial part because food had already been obtained locally.

The episode illustrates the importance of local Indigenous knowledge and subsistence production to the survival of outsiders in the Arctic. NOAA's account describes contributions by both Brower and local Iñupiat to the survival of the stranded whalers.

== Family and life in Barrow ==
Brower's personal life became closely intertwined with the Iñupiaq community. He married an Iñupiaq woman named Toctoo, whom he had first encountered during his early years in Alaska. Schell notes that Brower spent much of his first Arctic winter living in Iñupiaq camps, learning the language, and traveling through the region before later marrying Toctoo.

Toctoo and one of the couple's young children died during a measles epidemic in 1902. Schell reports that the outbreak caused extensive mortality among Iñupiat in the Barrow area.

Brower subsequently married Asianggataq, an Iñupiaq woman from the Barrow region. Anthropologist Margaret B. Blackman's biography of their daughter Sadie Brower Neakok places the Brower household within the broader bicultural history of 20th-century Barrow. The University of Washington Press describes Sadie as one of ten children of Asianggataq and Charles Brower. Sadie later became an educator, social worker, magistrate, and advocate for Iñupiaq language and community interests.

An Alaska Supreme Court decision concerning Brower's estate states that he was survived by 14 children when he died.

== Public reputation and Arctic visitors ==
By the early 20th century, Brower had developed a reputation beyond Barrow. Contemporary accounts referred to him as the "King of the Arctic", a nickname associated with his long residence in the region and his prominence among American visitors and commercial interests.

His reputation connected him with explorers, researchers, and aviators. In August 1935, humorist Will Rogers and aviator Wiley Post were flying from Fairbanks toward Point Barrow with the intention of visiting Brower when their aircraft crashed near Walakpa, southwest of Barrow, killing both men.

Brower also participated in scientific and collecting activities. His knowledge of northern Alaska made him useful to naturalists, archaeologists, and other researchers, while his own activities included collecting natural-history specimens and investigating archaeological sites.

== Fifty Years Below Zero ==
Brower's memoir, Fifty Years Below Zero: A Lifetime of Adventure in the Far North, was published in 1942. Explorer and anthropologist Vilhjalmur Stefansson encouraged Brower to record his experiences, believing that his familiarity with Iñupiaq life and Arctic Alaska made his recollections valuable. Brower began preparing an autobiographical manuscript during the 1920s under the title The Northernmost American.

The original manuscript was approximately 900 pages long. Brower sent sections to Stefansson as he completed them, but publishers considered the manuscript too lengthy. Portions were subsequently adapted into articles published in Blue Book magazine during the 1930s. In 1941, Dodd, Mead and Company agreed to prepare a substantially condensed and edited version for publication. Fifty Years Below Zero appeared in 1942 and subsequently went through numerous printings.

The University of Alaska Press later reissued the book with a new preface by historian Terrence Cole. The memoir has been used as a source for the history of commercial whaling, settlement, and Indigenous–non-Indigenous interaction in northern Alaska.

== Historical interpretation and criticism ==
Scholars have emphasized that Fifty Years Below Zero differs from many other American commercial-whaling memoirs of the period. Schell compares Brower's account with John A. Cook's Pursuing the Whale and Hartson H. Bodfish's Chasing the Bowhead. She argues that Brower gave substantial recognition to Indigenous expertise, particularly Iñupiaq knowledge of bowhead whale behavior, boat construction, hunting techniques, and the Arctic environment.

Schell argues that the memoir is valuable for documenting cultural exchange between American commercial whalers and Iñupiat, Yupik, and Inuvialuit communities. Brower's account demonstrates the dependence of outside whalers on Indigenous labor, technology, food, clothing, geographic knowledge, and environmental expertise.

At the same time, Brower's memoir is not a complete or neutral historical record. Drawing on Margaret Blackman's research, Schell identifies omissions in Brower's account. Brower wrote relatively little about his domestic life and did not discuss Asianggataq in the memoir despite their long relationship. Schell also notes Blackman's finding that Brower had participated in trading alcohol to Iñupiat before 1890, despite his later criticism of the destructive consequences of alcohol in the community.

These issues have led scholars to treat the memoir as both a valuable historical source and an autobiographical account shaped by Brower's own perspective and omissions.

== Death and legacy ==
Brower died in Barrow on February 11, 1945, at the age of 81. His memorial marker records his birth in New York City on March 6, 1863, and his death in Barrow in 1945. An Alaska Supreme Court decision concerning his estate independently gives February 11, 1945, as his date of death.

Brower's name remains associated with the geography of northern Alaska. The U.S. Geological Survey's Dictionary of Alaska Place Names records that Browerville, adjacent to Barrow, was named for Charles D. Brower because of his whaling station and trading post. Point Brower was also named after him.

Brower's surviving papers are held by Dartmouth College's Rauner Special Collections Library. The Charles D. Brower Papers, designated Mss-13, include diaries, articles, manuscripts, and galley proofs relating to his work as a whaler, trader, and postmaster. The collection includes materials associated with Fifty Years Below Zero, My Arctic Outpost, and the longer autobiographical manuscript The Northernmost American.

== Selected works ==
Brower, Charles D., with Philip J. Farrelly and Lyman Anson. Fifty Years Below Zero: A Lifetime of Adventure in the Far North. New York: Dodd, Mead & Company, 1942.
