= Eben Hopson =

American politician (1922–1980)

- Nanauq

Personal details
- Born: November 7, 1922 Utqiagvik, Alaska, U.S.
- Died: June 28, 1980 (aged 57) Utqiagvik, Alaska, U.S.
- Party: Democratic
- Spouse: Rebecca Panigeo
- Profession: Politician

Eben Nanauq Hopson (November 7, 1922 – June 28, 1980) was an American politician in the state of Alaska. An Iñupiaq, he was born and raised in Utqiaġvik (at the time known as Barrow) and was a heavy equipment operator. Hopson served in Alaska Territorial Legislature from 1957 to 1959 as well as the Alaska Senate upon statehood, representing District O from 1959 to 1967. He died from cancer in 1980 in Utqiaġvik, Alaska.

== Early life ==
Hopson was the first person to be born in the Presbyterian mission hospital in Utqiaġvik in 1922.

== Political career ==
Hopson served as the first mayor of Utqiaġvik, then known as Barrow. He was first elected to the position in 1972, and was reelected in 1975.

In 1977, Hopson founded the Inuit Circumpolar Council, an organization dedicated for the unification of Inuit voices throughout Alaska, Canada, and Greenland. The conference formally recognized Hopson as their founder in 1980.

In 1979, Hopson represented the Inuit in a court case suing the US Secretary of Commerce Juanita Kreps on the grounds that the International Whaling Commission had no standing to regulate subsistence whaling for native peoples. The case was initially ruled against Hopson by the Alaska district court, but was subsequently overturned in 1980 by the Ninth Circuit Court of Appeals.

== Death and legacy ==
Hopson was hospitalized in Utqiaġvik on June 16 and died from cancer on June 28, 1980. He was survived by his wife Rebecca and 12 children.

International Inuit Day, a celebration of the Inuit culture, has occurred on November 7 since 2006, in honor of Hopson's legacy.

The middle school serving Utqiaġvik is named after Hopson.
