= Prudhoe Bay Oil Field =

Large Alaskan oil field

Prudhoe Bay oil field
- Location within Alaska
- Country: United States
- Region: Alaska North Slope
- Offshore/onshore: onshore
- Coordinates: 70°18′24″N 148°43′57″W
- Operator: Hilcorp
- Partners: Hilcorp, ExxonMobil, ConocoPhillips

Field history
- Discovery: March 12, 1968 by ARCO and Exxon's Prudhoe Bay State #1 well
- Start of production: June 20, 1977
- Peak of production: 1.5 million barrels per day (240,000 m^{3}/d)
- Peak year: 1988

Production
- Current production of oil: 319,013 barrels per day (~1.590×10^{7} t/a)
- Year of current production of oil: 2023
- Estimated oil in place: 25,000 million barrels (~3.4×10^{9} t)
- Estimated gas in place: 46,500×10^{9} cu ft (1,320×10^{9} m^{3})
- Producing formations: Sadlerochit Group

Prudhoe Bay Oil Field is a large oil field on Alaska's North Slope. It is the largest oil field in North America, covering 213,543 acres (86,418 ha) and originally contained approximately 25 billion barrels (4.0×10^{9} m^{3}) of oil. The amount of recoverable oil in the field is more than double that of the next largest field in the United States by acreage (the East Texas Oil Field), while the largest by reserves is the Permian Basin (North America). The field was operated by BP; partners were ExxonMobil and ConocoPhillips until August 2019; when BP sold all its Alaska assets to Hilcorp.

== Location ==
The field is located 400 miles (640 km) north of Fairbanks and 650 miles (1,050 km) north of Anchorage, 250 miles (400 km) north of the Arctic Circle, and 358 miles (576 km) south of the North Pole. It is on the North Slope and lies between the National Petroleum Reserve–Alaska to the west and the Arctic National Wildlife Refuge to the east. It is accessible by road from Fairbanks, Alaska via the Elliott Highway and Dalton Highway.

== Leasing ==
The State of Alaska owns the land and leases the area as the Prudhoe Bay Unit. In the terminology that the State of Alaska uses in its leasing program, the "Prudhoe Bay Oil Field" is called the Prudhoe Bay Oil Pool. Oil pools within the Prudhoe Bay Unit include the following – maps showing the location of each pool are in the associated reference.

Pool name	Operator	Discovery well driller	Discovery well start date
Aurora	BP Exploration	Mobil	August 24, 1969
Borealis Pool	BP Exploration	Mobil	August 8, 1969
Lisburne	BP Exploration	Arco	December 16, 1967
Midnight Sun	BP Exploration	BP Exploration	December 20, 1997
Russell Drilling Undef	BP Exploration	BP Exploration	March 10, 2001
Niakuk	BP Exploration	Sohio	April 18, 1985
N Prudhoe Bay	BP Exploration	Arco	April 4, 1970
Orion	BP Exploration	Mobil	April 7, 1969
Polaris	BP Exploration	BP Exploration	August 24, 1969
Pt. McIntyre	BP Exploration	Arco / Exxon	March 22, 1988
Prudhoe	BP Exploration	Arco	December 19, 1967
PM Stump Island	BP Exploration	Arco / Exxon	March 22, 1988
PM Undefined	BP Exploration	BP Exploration	January 25, 1997
Ugnu Undefined WTRSP	BP Exploration	BP Exploration	May 20, 2004
West Beach	BP Exploration	Arco	July 26, 1976
W Beach Tertiary Undef WTR Pool	BP Exploration	Arco / Exxon	July 22, 1976

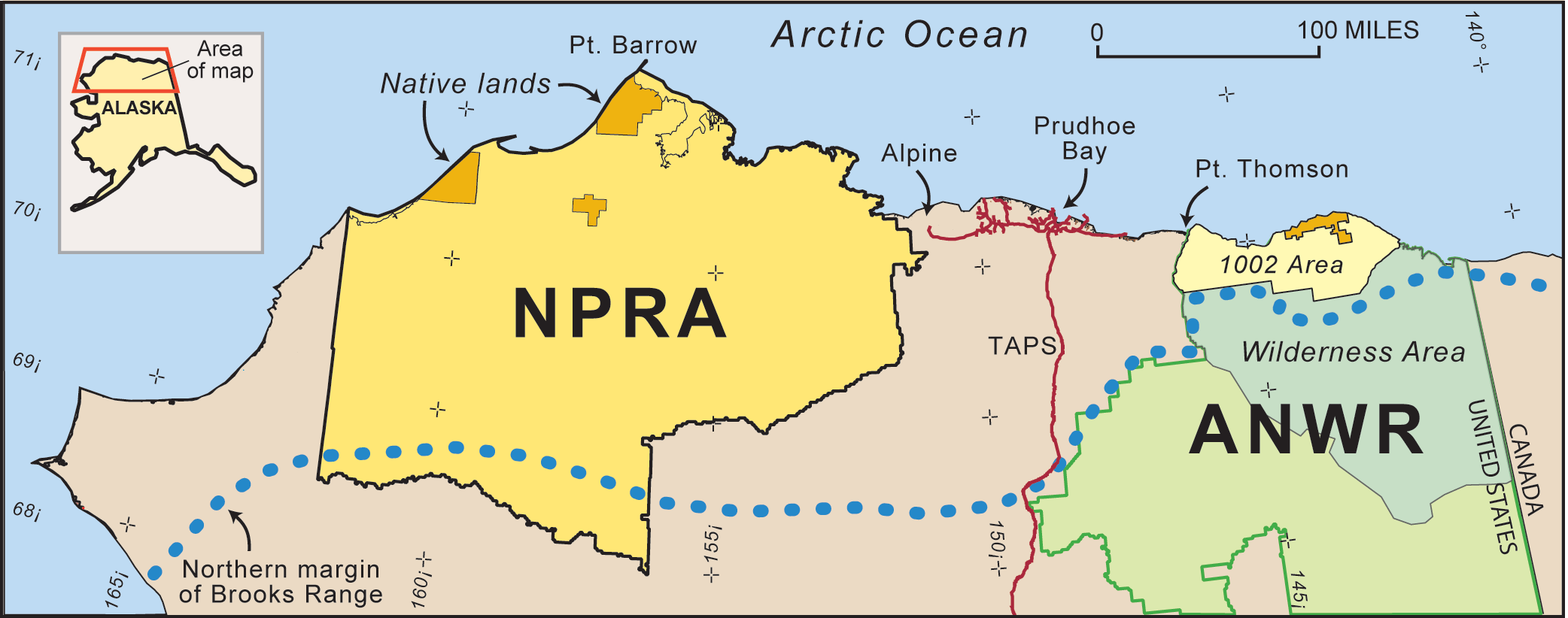
A map of northern Alaska; the dotted line shows the southern boundary of the North Slope. The National Petroleum Reserve–Alaska is to the West, the Arctic National Wildlife Refuge to the east, and Prudhoe Bay is between them. Red lines are pipelines.

== History ==
- Prudhoe Bay Oil Field Discovery Well Site
- U.S. National Register of Historic Places
- Alaska Heritage Resources Survey
- Location within Alaska
- Location: About 1.5 miles (2.4 km) northwest of Putuligayuk River mouth, along western shore of Prudhoe Bay
- Nearest city: Prudhoe Bay
- Coordinates: 70°19′27″N 148°32′28″W
- Area: less than one acre
- Built: 1967
- Built by: Atlantic Richfield Corporation; Humble Oil Company
- NRHP reference No.: 00000264
- AHRS No.: XBP-00056
- Added to NRHP: March 23, 2000

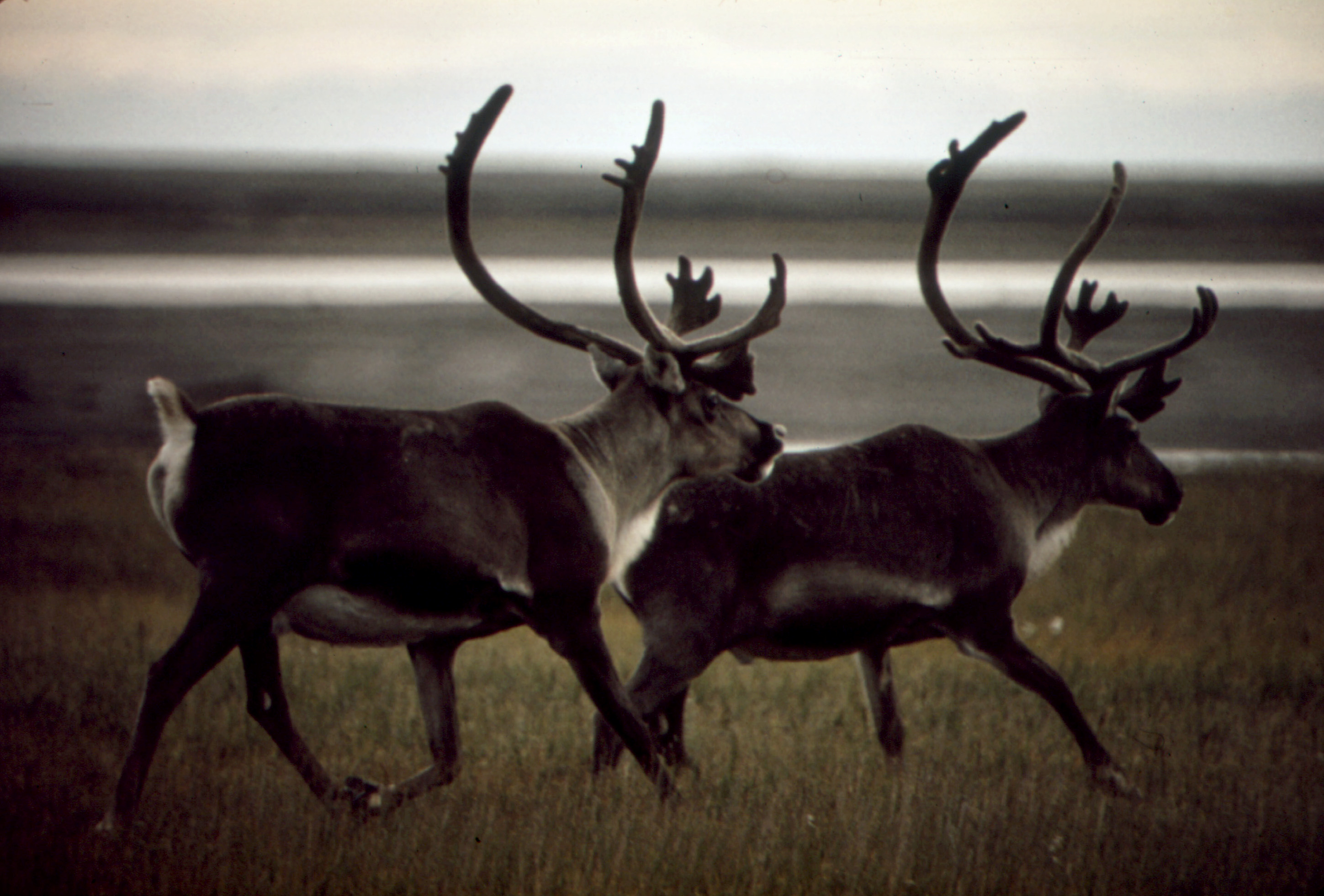
Caribou near Prudhoe Bay, 1973

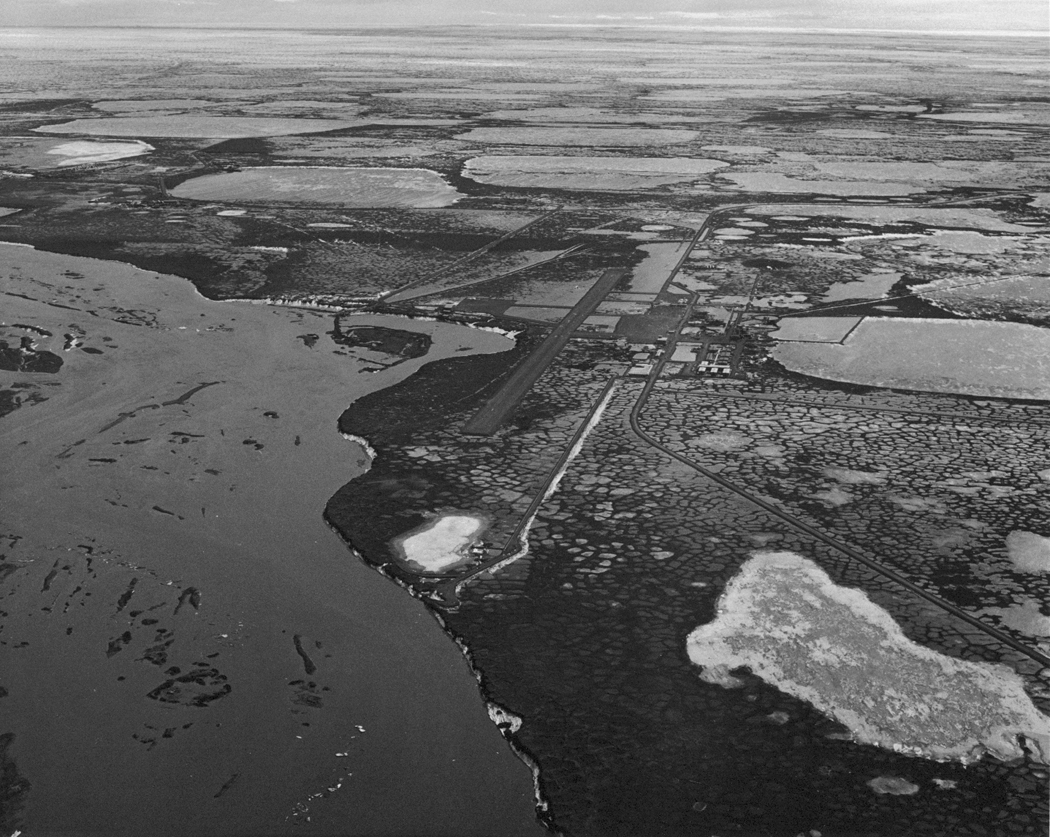
1971 aerial photo of the oil fields by the United States Fish and Wildlife Service.

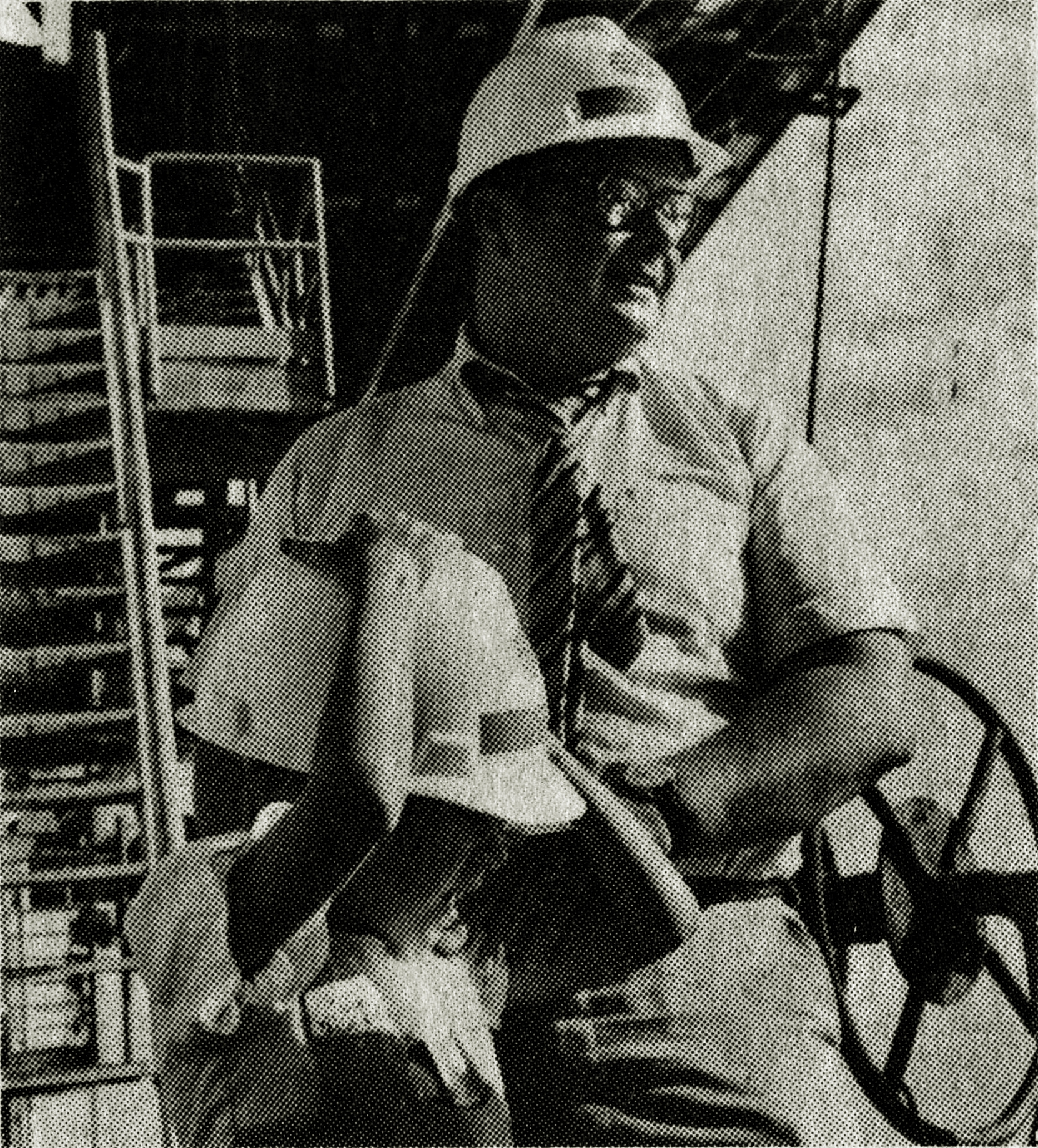
Roger MacBride touring the oil field facilities during his 1976 presidential campaign.

The area was originally identified as a potential oil field and selected in the early 1960s as part of the 100 million acres the federal government allotted to the new state of Alaska under the Alaska Statehood Act as a form of economic support. Tom Marshall, a key state employee tasked with selecting the 100 million acres, said the geology reminded him of big oil basins he'd seen in Wyoming. Commercial oil exploration started in Prudhoe Bay area in the 1960s and, after a number of fruitless years, a rig produced a natural gas flare in December 1967. The oil field was confirmed on March 12, 1968, by Humble Oil (which later became part of Exxon) and Atlantic Richfield Company (ARCO), with the well Prudhoe Bay State #1. ARCO was the operating partner. Drilling sites for the discovery and confirmation wells were staked by geologist Marvin Mangus. BP was among the companies that had been active in the region, and BP was able to establish itself as a major player in the western part of the Prudhoe field. The field was initially operated as two separate developments, the BP Western Operating Area and the ARCO Eastern Operating Area. Upon acquisition of ARCO by BP and sale of ARCO Alaska assets to Phillips Petroleum in 2000, the two operating areas were consolidated and BP became the sole operator of the field. In 1974 the State of Alaska's Division of Geological & Geophysical Surveys estimated that the field held 10 billion barrels (1.6×10^{9} m^{3}) of oil and 26 trillion cubic feet (740×10^{9} m^{3}) of natural gas. Production did not begin until June 20, 1977 when the Alaska Pipeline was completed.

The site of the field's discovery was listed on the National Register of Historic Places in 2000, and has a commemorative marker. A well was operated at that site until 1985.

== Operations ==
The field was initially operated as two separate developments, the BP Western Operating Area (WOA: Oil Rim) and the ARCO Eastern Operating Area (EOA: Gas Cap). Upon the acquisition of ARCO by BP and the sale of ARCO Alaska assets to Phillips Petroleum in 2000, the two operating areas were consolidated and BP became the sole operator of the field.

In the field, oil is moved through pipelines from about 1000 wells to a pumping station at the head of the Trans-Alaska Pipeline; "flow lines" carry oil from the wells to local processing centers, then through "transit lines" to the pumping station. According to a 2007 recording of a BP representative, to replace the "huge volume of material" BP removes from beneath the ground, seawater is injected that is collected from Prudhoe Bay.

== Production ==
North Slope oil production peaked in 1988 at 2 million barrels per day (320×10^{3} m^{3}/d)(Greater Prudhoe Bay: 1.5 million barrels per day (240×10^{3} m^{3}/d), but had fallen to 943,000 barrels per day (149,900 m^{3}/d) in 2005, while Greater Prudhoe averaged 411,000 barrels per day (65,300 m^{3}/d) in December 2006 and Prudhoe itself averaged 285,000 barrels per day (45,300 m^{3}/d). Total production from 1977 through 2005 was 11 billion barrels (1.7×10^{9} m^{3}).

As of August 2006, BP estimated that 2 billion barrels (320×10^{6} m^{3}) of recoverable oil remain and can be recovered with current technology.

Hilcorp energy is the field operator at Prudhoe Bay and has engaged in an aggressive redevelopment of the aging field since taking over as operator in mid-2019 from BP.

Prudhoe Bay production was 319,013 barrels per day (50,719.0 m^{3}/d) in February compared with 316,825 barrels per day (50,371.1 m^{3}/d) barrels per day in January and 305,780 barrels per day (48,615 m^{3}/d)barrels per day year-over-year in February, 2021.

== Associated oil fields ==
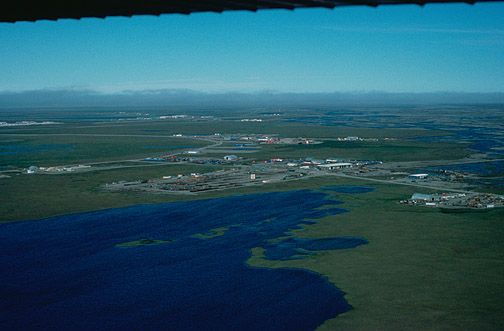
Oilfield facilities at Prudhoe Bay.

The Milne Point oil field is 35 miles (56 km) west of Prudhoe Bay and the leased area, called the Milne Point Unit by the State of Alaska, includes the Kuparuk River Oil Pool, Sag River Oil Pool, and the Schrader Bluff Oil Pool.

The source rock for the Prudhoe Bay Oil Field and neighboring reserves is a potential source for tight oil and shale gas. As of 2013 mineral rights to 500,000 acres overlying the North Slope oil shale had been leased by Great Bear Petroleum whose principal is the petroleum geologist Ed Duncan. Paul Basinski, who has been called "one of the fathers of fracking", drove the exploration of fracking of the highly radioactive zone shale (HRZ shale) at Prudhoe Bay Oil Field; he died in 2018 of complications following a heart transplant.

== Geology ==
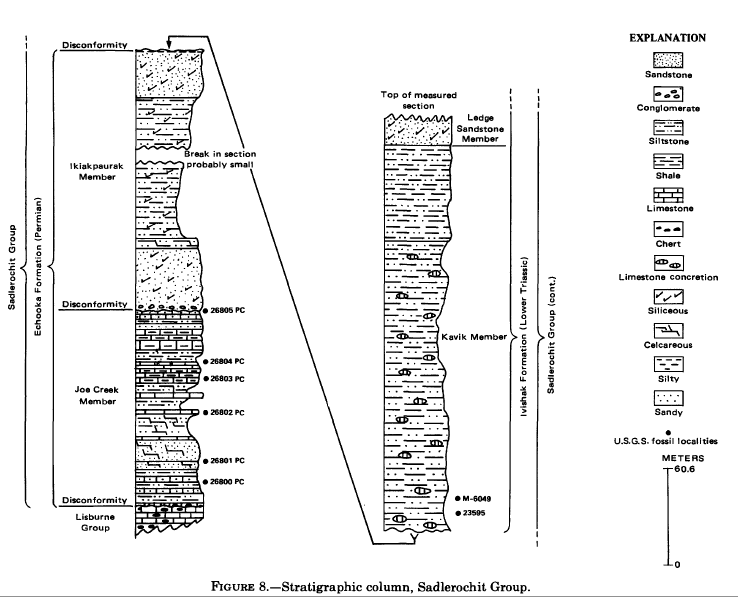
Sadlerochit stratigraphic column

The field is an anticline structure located on the Barrow Arch, with faulting on the north side of the arch and a Lower Cretaceous unconformity on the east.

Claims on petroleum seeps in the Cape Simpson area were first made in 1915 by a group consisting of T.L. Richardson, W.B. Van Valen, O. Hansen, B. Panigeo and Egowa after these last two, Eskimos, pointed out two large mounds fifty feet high and 200 feet in diameter. Gold prospectors Smith and Berry also discovered these seeps and formed an investment group in San Francisco led by R.D. Adams, who funded an investigation led by the geologist H.A. Campbell. His report noted disputing claims by Standard Oil Company. This led to the establishment of the Naval Petroleum Reserve No. 4 in 1923, after which the Navy engaged the United States Geological Survey to survey the area from 1923 until 1926, who concluded the best objectives were Cretaceous rocks. From 1943 until 1953, the Navy drilled eighty wells, including the area at Cape Simpson and Umiat but none flowed more than 250 barrels per day.

The discovery of the Swanson River Oil Field on the Kenai Peninsula in 1957 by the Richfield Oil Corporation prompted the company to send geologists to the Arctic starting in 1959 and seismic survey crews in 1963, which recorded a reconnaissance line across what was identified as the Prudhoe structure in 1964. In 1965, during the state lease sale, Richfield partnered with Humble Oil and acquired leases over what was later identified as the gas cap while BP was awarded leases over the "oil ring".

In 1968, Prudhoe Bay State No. 1 encountered the Permian-Triassic Sadlerochit formation at 8200 feet which flowed gas at 1.25 million cubic feet per day with 20–27 per cent porosity and "tens of millidarcies" permeability. Oil, condensate and gas are produced from the Triassic, Ivishak sandstone. This reservoir was deposited as a complex amalgamation of fan deltas and alluvial fans. The continuity of this fan delta was shown to extend seven miles away when the ARCO-Humble Sag River State No. 1 well was drilled. During the field's early life the oil-bearing sandstone in some locations was 600 feet (180 m) thick. Today, the oil bearing zone's average thickness is about 60 feet (18 m) and the initial estimate of Oil in place was 2.3 billion barrels.

The original target of the Prudhoe Bay State No. 1 was the Mississippian Lisburne limestone, encountered at 8,800 feet and flowed 1,152 barrels of oil per day in the 9,505 to 9,825 foot interval along with 1.3 million cubic feet of gas. This initial oil was burned "because there wasn't ample storage", the flames of which were spotted by a passing airline. The Department of Energy in 1991 estimated oil in place for this formation at 3.1 billion barrels.

=== Statistics ===
Statistics for the Greater Prudhoe Bay Field:

- Discovery well: Prudhoe Bay State #1
- Discovery date: December 26, 1967
- Step-out well March 1968 confirmed
- Production start: June 20, 1977
- Total field area: 213,543 acres (864.18 km^{2})
- Oil production wells: 1114
- Total capacity: 25 billion barrels (4.0×10^{9} m^{3})
  - Produced: 12 billion barrels (1.9×10^{9} m^{3}) as of March 28, 2013
  - Total recoverable: 16 billion barrels (2.5×10^{9} m^{3})
  - Remaining recoverable: 4 billion barrels (640,000,000 m^{3})
- Peak production: 1.97 million barrels per day (1988)
- Natural gas:
  - Total: 46×10^{12} cu ft (1,300 km^{3}) (estimated)
  - Recoverable: 26×10^{12} cu ft (740 km^{3})
- Greater Prudhoe Bay satellite fields:
  - East Operating Area (formerly ARCO)(production start date: 1977)
  - West Operating Area (BP Exploration)(production start date: 1977)
  - Midnight Sun (production start date: 1998)
  - Aurora (production start date: 2000)
  - Orion (production start date: 2002)
  - Polaris (production start date: 1999)
  - Borealis (production start date: 2001)
- Ownership:
  - Hilcorp (Operator): 26%
  - ConocoPhillips.: 36%
  - ExxonMobil: 36%
  - Others: 2%
- On 27 August 2019 BP announces the agreement to sell all its Alaska operations and interests to Hilcorp for $5.6 billion. The transaction includes interests in giant Prudhoe Bay field and Trans Alaska Pipeline.

== March 2006 oil spill ==
On March 2, 2006, a worker for BP Exploration (Alaska) discovered an oil spill in western Prudhoe Bay. Up to 6,400 barrels (1,020 m^{3}) were spilled, making it the largest oil spill on Alaska's north slope to date. The spill was attributed to a pipeline rupture.

In October 2007, BP was found guilty of a misdemeanor violation of the Clean Water Act to resolve criminal liability relating to pipeline leaks of crude oil. As a result of the guilty plea, BP Alaska agreed to pay $20 million which included the criminal fine, community service payments and criminal restitution.

== August 2006 shutdown ==
The March 2006 oil spill led the United States Department of Transportation to mandate that the transit lines be inspected for corrosion. As a result, BP announced on 6 August 2006 they had discovered severe corrosion, with losses of 70 to 81 percent in the 3/8-inch thickness of the pipe walls. Oil leaking was reported in one area, with the equivalent of four to five barrels of oil spilled. The damage required replacement of 16 of 22 miles (35 km) of pipeline at the Prudhoe Bay. BP said it was surprised to find such severe corrosion and that it had been 14 years since they had used a pipeline inspection gauge ("pig") to clean out its lines because the company believed the use of the pigging equipment might damage pipe integrity. BP Exploration announced that they were shutting down the oil field indefinitely, due to the severe corrosion and a minor leak in the oil transit lines. This led to an 8% reduction in the amount of oil produced by the United States, as Prudhoe Bay was the country's largest oil producer, producing over 400,000 barrels per day (64,000 m^{3}/d).

BP initially estimated up to 2 to 3 months before the pipelines would be fully operational. This caused increases in world oil prices, and BP revised the estimated operational date to January 2007. London brent crude hit an intra-day high of $77.73/barrel, the all-time high, at that time, being $78.18/barrel. United States crude oil peaked at $76.67/barrel. The state of Alaska, which gets most of its revenue from taxing the oil industry, lost as much as $6.4 million each day until production restarted.

No part of the Alaska Pipeline was affected, although Alyeska said that lower crude oil volumes could slow pumping during the BP shutdown.

The field has since reopened. In mid-June 2007, however, a small leak occurred in one of the pipelines that connect the field to the Trans-Alaska Pipeline, shutting down the field for a week.

In March 2009 the State of Alaska sued BP in matter number 3AN-09-06181-CI alleging that BP was negligent in its management of rigging operations and corrosion control in the transit lines leading from the field into pumping station one of the Trans Alaska Pipeline. The state is seeking damages for lost royalty and tax revenues. The case seems to have been dismissed in 2010.

== See also ==
- Mount Elbert Gas Hydrate Site
