= Applied Physics Laboratory Ice Station =

Japanese laboratory

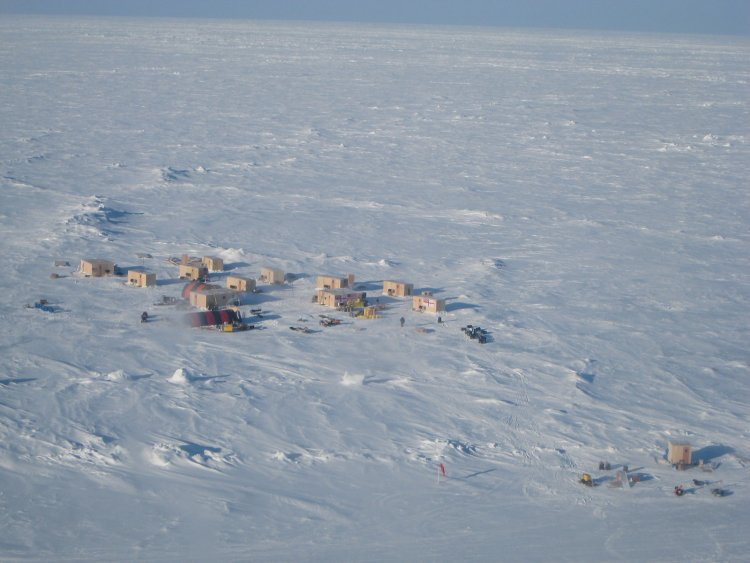
APlIS encampment in 2007

The Applied Physics Laboratory Ice Station 2007 (APLIS07) is a U.S. and Japanese laboratory dedicated to the study of global climate change. It is located on an ice floe about 300 kilometres (190 mi) north Prudhoe Bay (Sagavanirktok), Alaska. It was first established in March 2011. It is owned and administered by the International Arctic Research Center at the University of Alaska Fairbanks.

== In popular culture ==
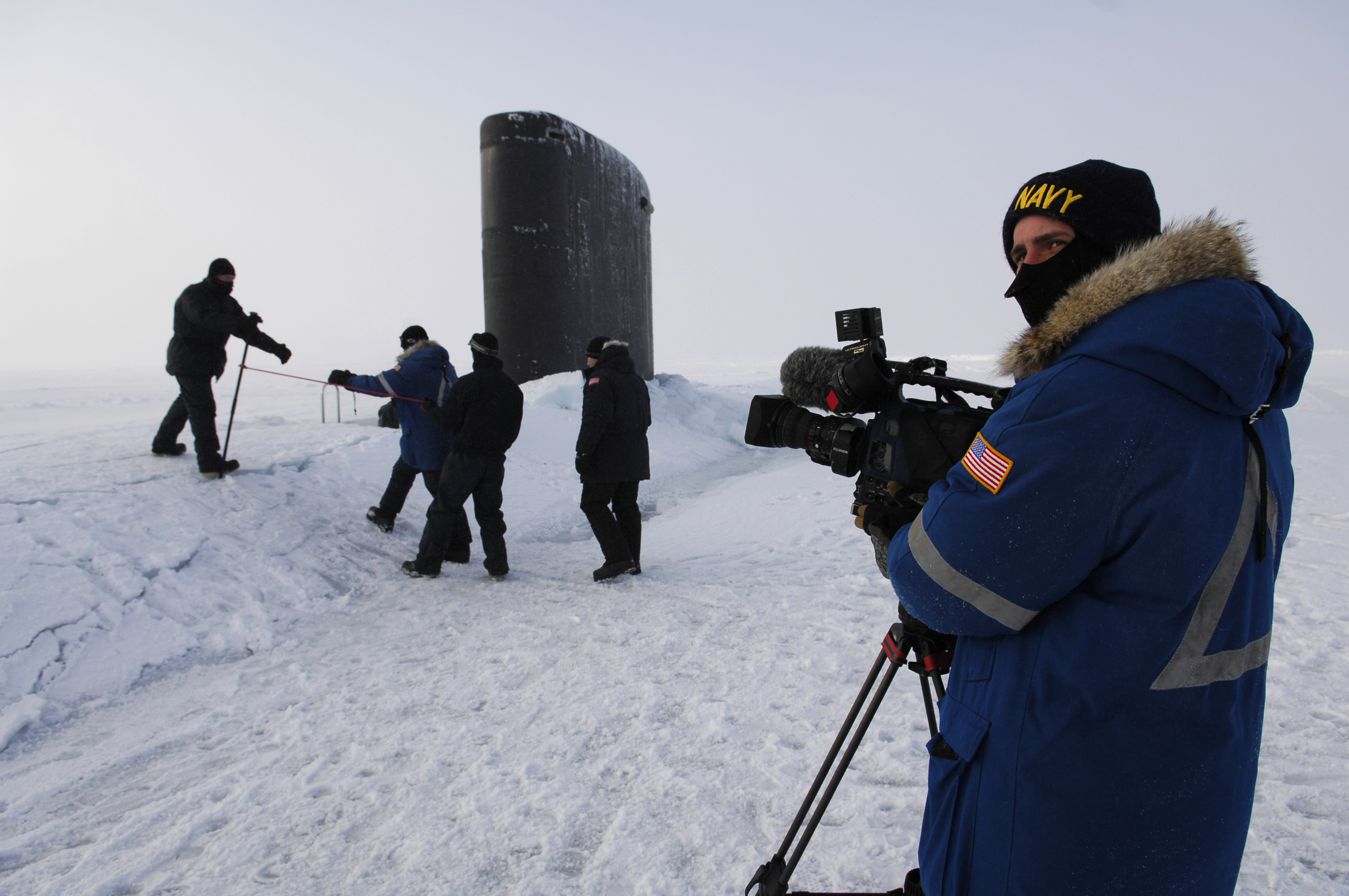
USS Alexandria breaking the ice

In 2007, APLIS was used for filming scenes in the movie Stargate: Continuum, in cooperation with the U.S. Navy submarine USS Alexandria (SSN-757).
