= Alaska North Slope =

Northern region of Alaska, United States

Coordinates: 69.0578758°N 152.8628274°W

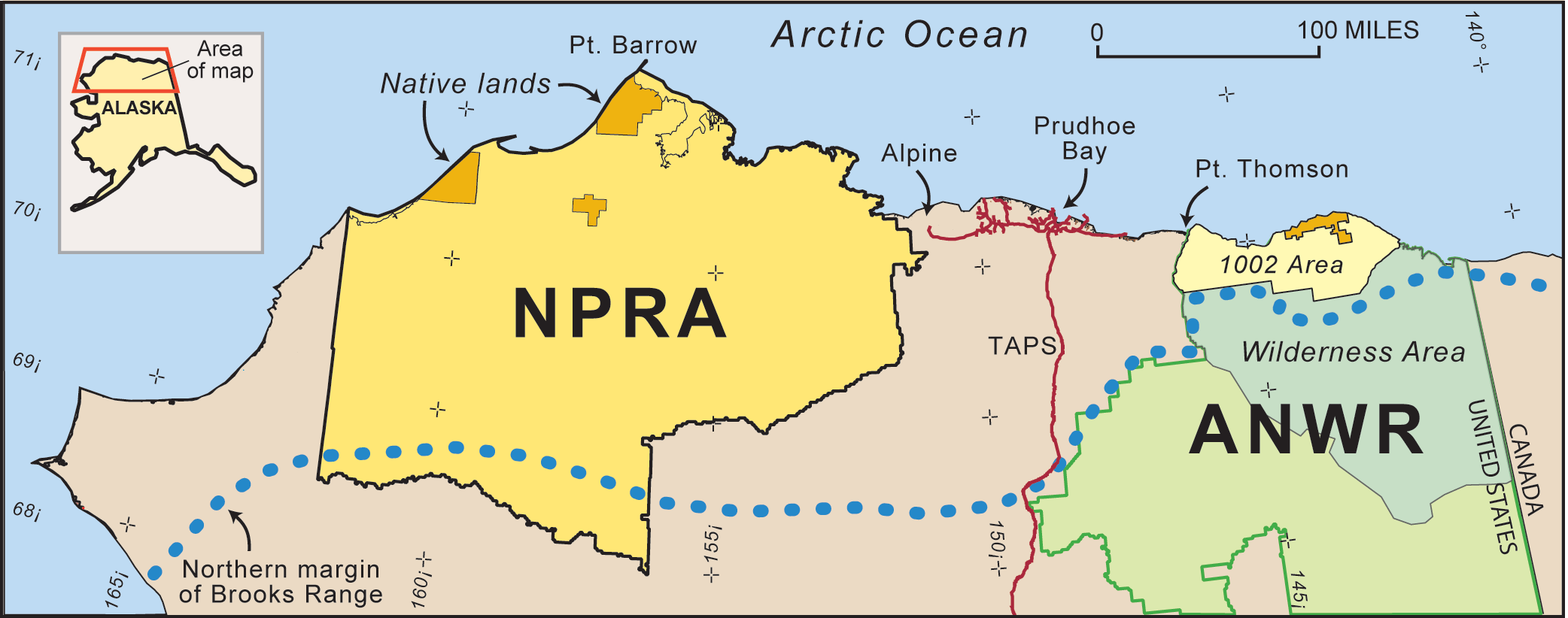
A map of northern Alaska; the dotted line shows the southern boundary of the North Slope. The National Petroleum Reserve–Alaska is to the West, the Arctic National Wildlife Refuge to the east, and Prudhoe Bay is between them.

The Alaska North Slope or Alaska Arctic Slope (Iñupiaq: Siḷaliñiq) is the region of the U.S. state of Alaska located on the northern slope of the Brooks Range along the coast of two marginal seas of the Arctic Ocean, the Chukchi Sea being on the western side of Point Barrow, and the Beaufort Sea on the eastern. With the exception of the highway connecting Fairbanks to Prudhoe Bay, the region is disconnected from the rest of the Alaskan road system and relies mostly on waterways and small airports for transportation due to the Brooks Range secluding the region from the rest of the state.

The entire Arctic coastal plain of Alaska with its Arctic coastal tundra has tremendous ecological importance with the densest concentration of birds in the Arctic, along with housing substantial amounts of large mammals such as whales, walrus, seals, caribou, and moose. The region includes the Arctic National Wildlife Refuge (ANWR) as well as the National Petroleum Reserve–Alaska (NPRA).

== Topography ==
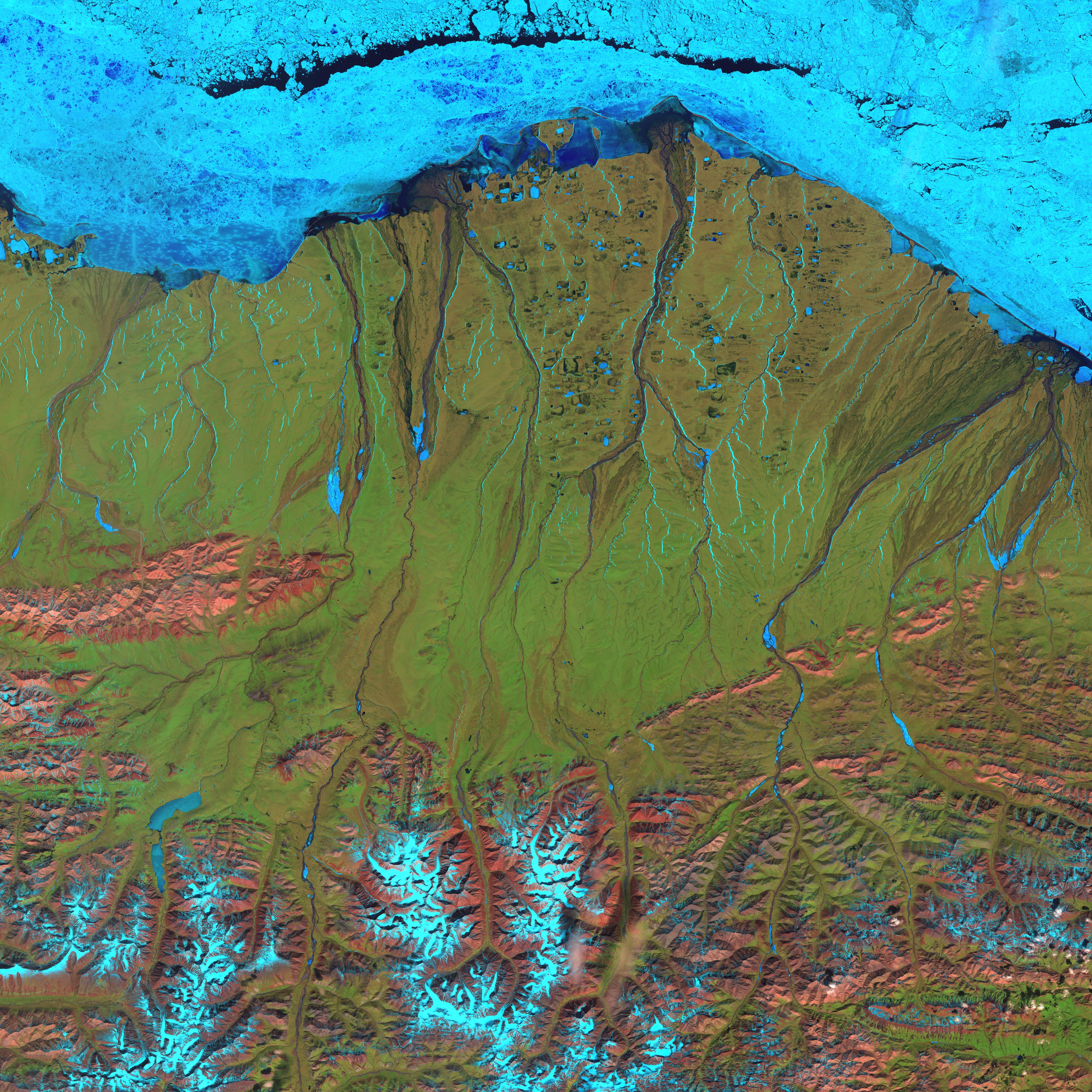
Landsat 7 false-color image of the North Slope. Along the coast, fast ice still clings to the shore in a solid, frozen sheet. At the top of the scene is the drifting sea ice. A dark blue strip of open water, known as a flaw lead, separates the fast ice from the drifting sea ice. The Brooks Range is visible at the bottom. (June 2001)

Within the North Slope, only a surface "active layer" of the tundra thaws each season; most of the soil is permanently frozen year-round. On top of this permafrost, water flows out to sea via shallow, braided streams or settles into pools and ponds. Along the bottom of the Landsat 7 image on the right, the rugged terrain of the Brooks Range mountains is snow-covered in places (blue areas) and exposed (pink areas) in others.

Much of the region is located politically in North Slope Borough, and geographically in the Alaska North Slope basin.

On August 12, 2018, a 6.4 magnitude earthquake hit the region, the most powerful recorded for the Alaskan North Slope.

== Ecology ==
The region includes the Arctic National Wildlife Refuge. The entire coastal plain of Alaska has tremendous ecological importance, with the densest concentration of birds in the Arctic.

== Petroleum resources ==
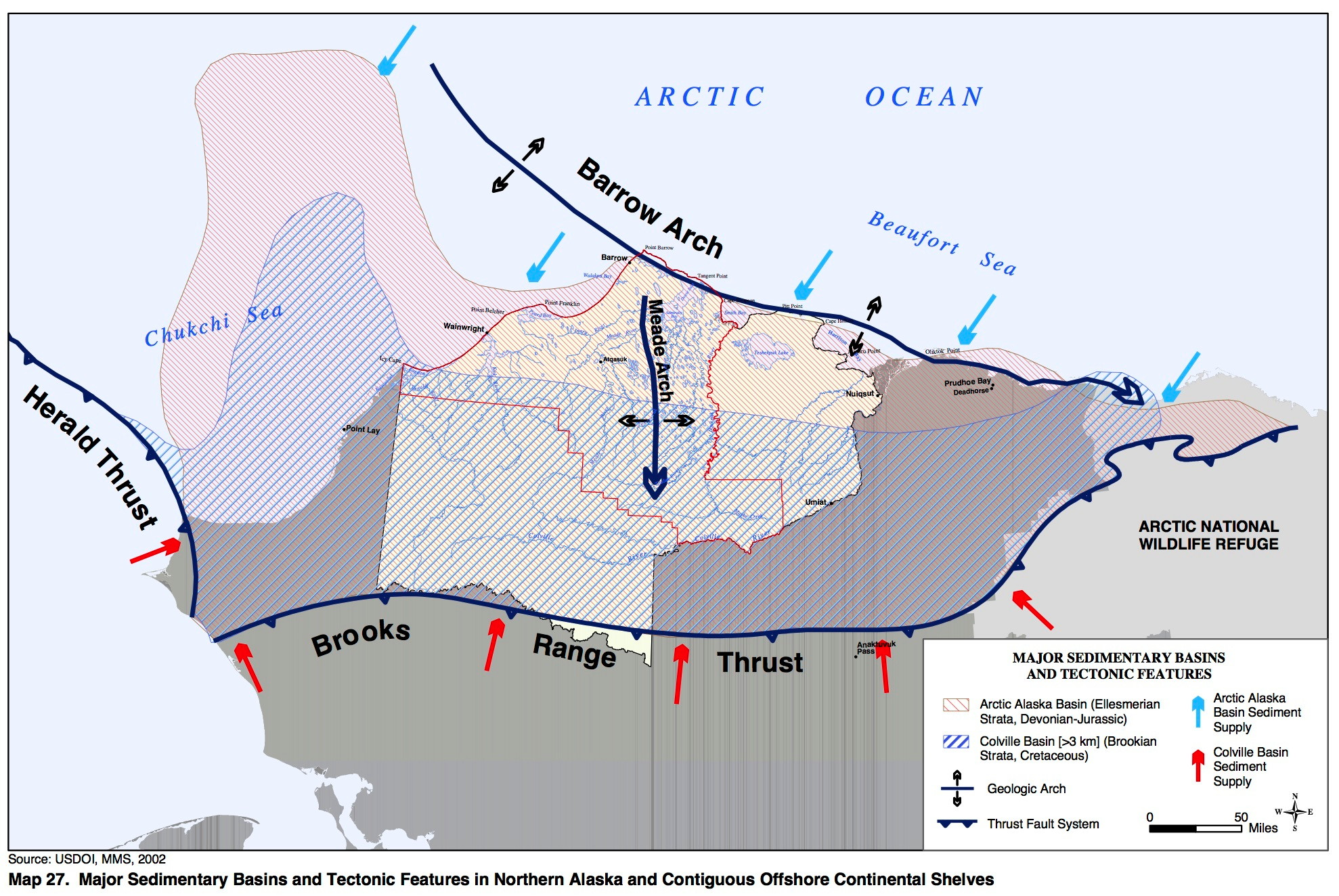
Map from the US Bureau of Land Management showing structures that create the oil fields in Alaska

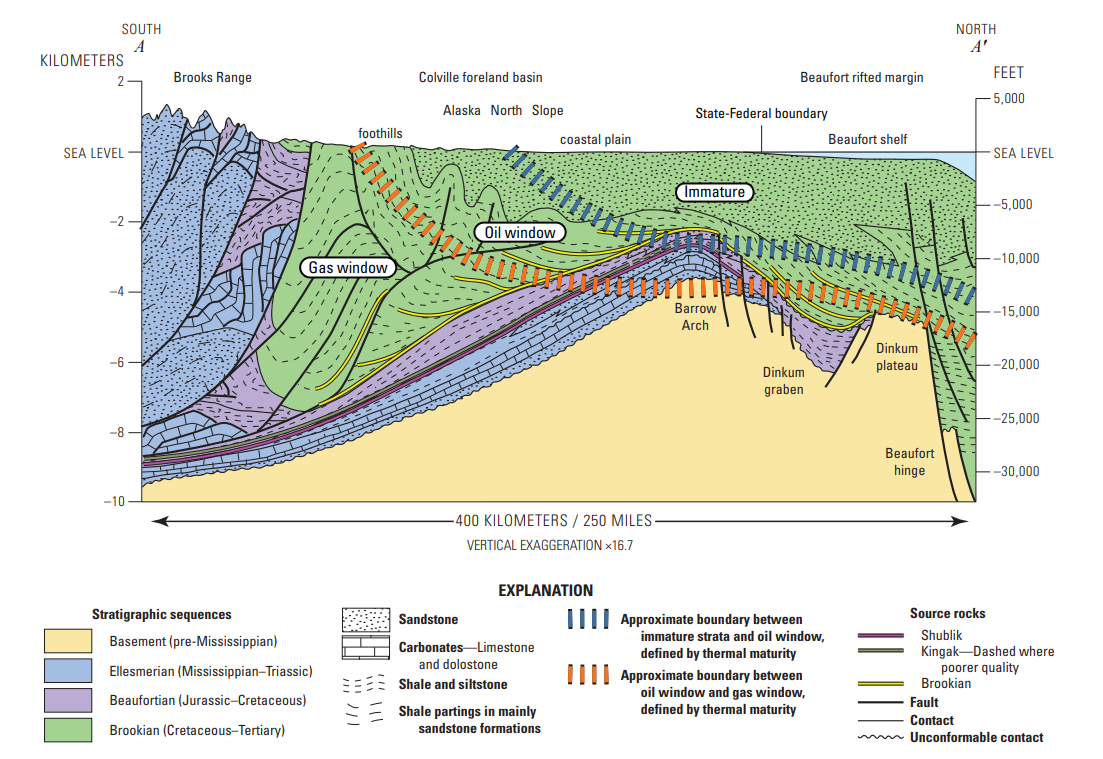
North Slope geologic cross section

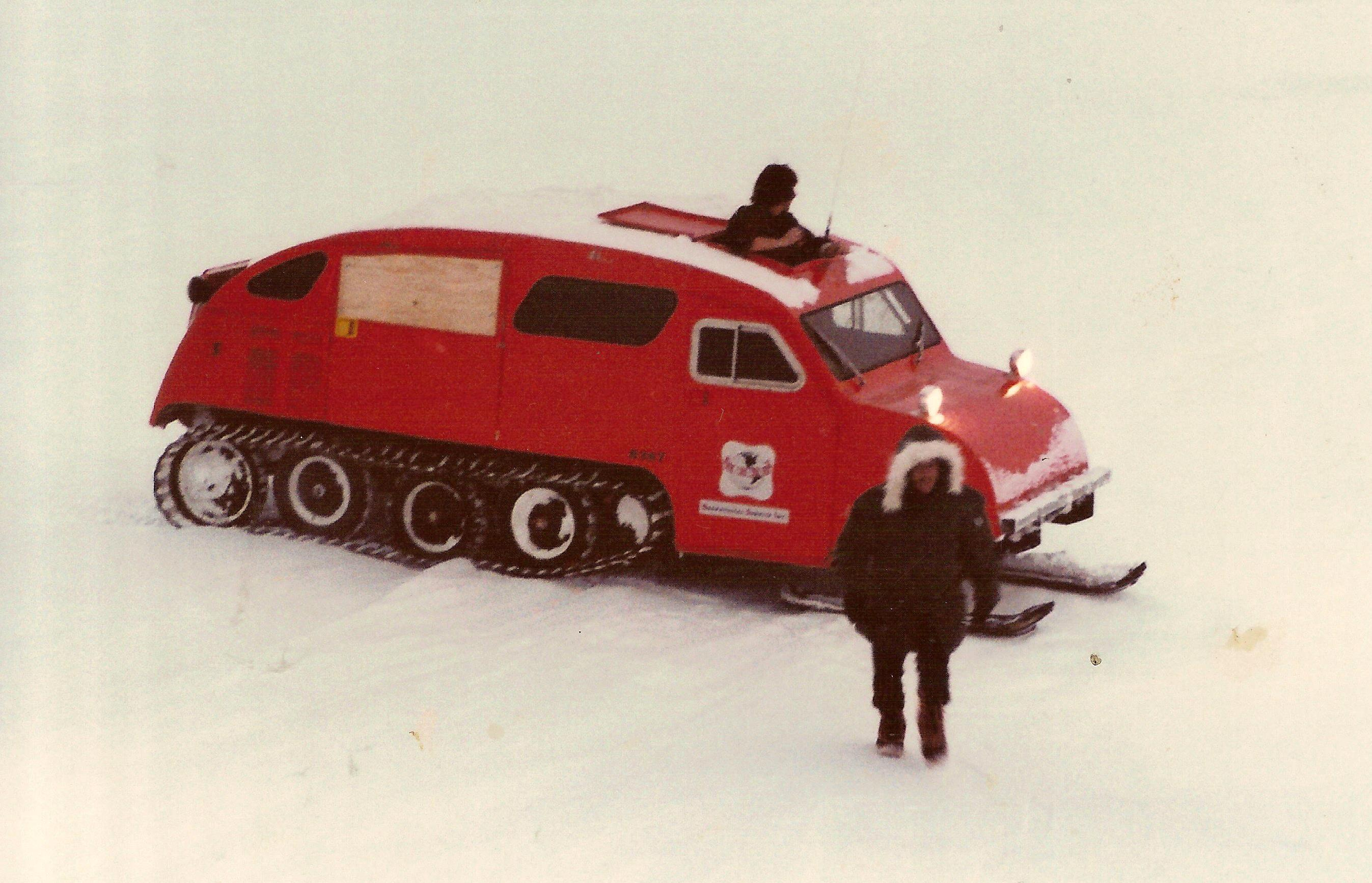
Geophysical Service Inc. seismic exploration crew, Deadhorse, Alaska, 1981

Under the North Slope is an ancient seabed, which now contains large amounts of petroleum. Within the North Slope, there is a geological feature called the Barrow Arch — a belt of the kind of rock known to be able to serve as a trap for oil. It runs from the city of Utqiaġvik to a point just west of the Arctic National Wildlife Refuge.

Ira Harkey quotes Noel Wien as stating that in the 1920s, "To keep warm and to cook with, the Eskimo was burning hunks of dark stuff he just picked up on the ground all around his tent. This was oil from seepage under the tundra. The Eskimos had always known about the oil, long before there was any drilling for it."

The North Slope region includes the National Petroleum Reserve–Alaska (NPRA), which was established by President Warren G. Harding in 1923 as an oil supply for the US Navy, though the presence of oil in the region had been known by American whalers for some time. It constituted the bulk of Alaska's known petroleum until the Prudhoe Bay Oil Field was discovered (outside the NPRA) in 1968, followed by the Kuparuk River oil field in 1969. The petroleum extracted from the region is transferred south by means of the Trans-Alaska Pipeline System to Valdez on the Pacific Ocean.

In 2005 the USGS estimated that the Arctic Alaska Petroleum Province, encompassing all the lands and adjacent Continental Shelf areas north of the Brooks Range-Herald arch (see map) held more than 50 billion bbl of oil and natural-gas liquids and 227 trillion cubic feet of gas.

The source rock for the Prudhoe Bay Oil Field and neighboring reserves is also a potential source for unconventional tight oil and shale gas – possibly containing "up to 2 billion barrels of technically recoverable oil and up to 80 trillion cubic feet of natural gas, according to a 2012 U.S. Geological Survey report."

Alaska North Slope (ANS) is a more expensive waterborne crude oil. Since 1987, Alaska North Slope (ANS) crude production has been in decline.

As of 2020, the U.S. Geological Survey estimated 3.6 billion barrels of oil and 8.9 trillion cubic feet of natural gas in Mississippian through Paleogene strata in the central North Slope of Alaska, which are undiscovered and technically recoverable.

== See also ==
- Arctic Alaska-Chukotka terrane
- Arctic coastal tundra
- Arctic foothills tundra
- BP hazardous substance dumping
- Mount Elbert Gas Hydrate Site
- North Slope Borough
- Project Chariot
