= HMS Tireless (S88) =

Trafalgar-class nuclear-powered attack submarine of the Royal Navy

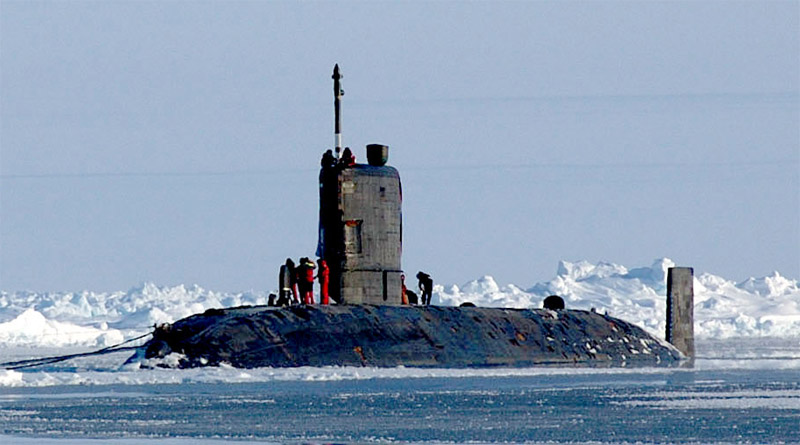
- HMS Tireless (S88) at the North Pole, April 2004

History

United Kingdom
- Name: HMS Tireless
- Ordered: 5 July 1979
- Builder: Vickers Shipbuilding and Engineering, Barrow-in-Furness
- Laid down: 6 June 1981
- Launched: 17 March 1984
- Sponsored by: Sue Squires
- Commissioned: 5 October 1985
- Decommissioned: 19 June 2014
- Home port: HMNB Devonport, Plymouth
- Identification: Pennant number: S88
- Status: Decommissioned
- Badge

General characteristics
- Class & type: Trafalgar-class submarine
- Displacement: Surfaced: 4,500 to 4,800 t (4,700 long tons; 5,300 short tons); Submerged: 5,200 to 5,300 t (5,200 long tons; 5,800 short tons)
- Length: 85.4 m (280 ft)
- Beam: 9.8 m (32 ft)
- Draught: 9.5 m (31 ft)
- Propulsion: 1 × Rolls-Royce PWR1 nuclear reactor, HEU 93.5%; 2 × GEC steam turbines; 2 × WH Allen turbo generators; 3.2 MW; 2 × Paxman diesel generators 2,800 shp (2.1 MW); 1 × pump jet propulsor; 1 × motor for emergency drive; 1 × auxiliary retractable prop
- Speed: Over 30 knots (56 km/h), submerged
- Range: Unlimited
- Complement: 130
- Electronic warfare & decoys: 2 × SSE Mk8 launchers for Type 2066 and Type 2071 torpedo decoys; RESM Racal UAP passive intercept; CESM Outfit CXA; SAWCS decoys carried from 2002
- Armament: 5 × 21-inch (533 mm) torpedo tubes with stowage for up to 30 weapons: Tomahawk Block IV cruise missiles; Spearfish heavyweight torpedoes

HMS Tireless was the third Trafalgar-class nuclear submarine of the Royal Navy. Tireless is the second submarine of the Royal Navy to bear this name. Launched in March 1984, Tireless was sponsored by Sue Squires, wife of Admiral 'Tubby' Squires, and commissioned in October 1985.

During the Cold War Tireless was primarily involved in anti-submarine warfare patrols in the Atlantic Ocean. After the Cold War, Tireless was deployed around the world, including to the Arctic Ocean, Mediterranean Sea and Pacific Ocean. At the end of its career, Tireless was involved in the search for the missing airliner, Malaysia Airlines Flight 370. The vessel experienced a number of serious accidents during its operational life.

Tireless had been scheduled for retirement during 2013, but its service was extended until eventual decommissioning on 19 June 2014. Tireless was replaced on active duty by HMS Artful.

== Operational history ==
From commissioning in 1985, Tireless completed numerous exercises and visits around the world, including a trip to the Arctic in 1991, before entering a refit in early 1996, returning to sea in 1999.

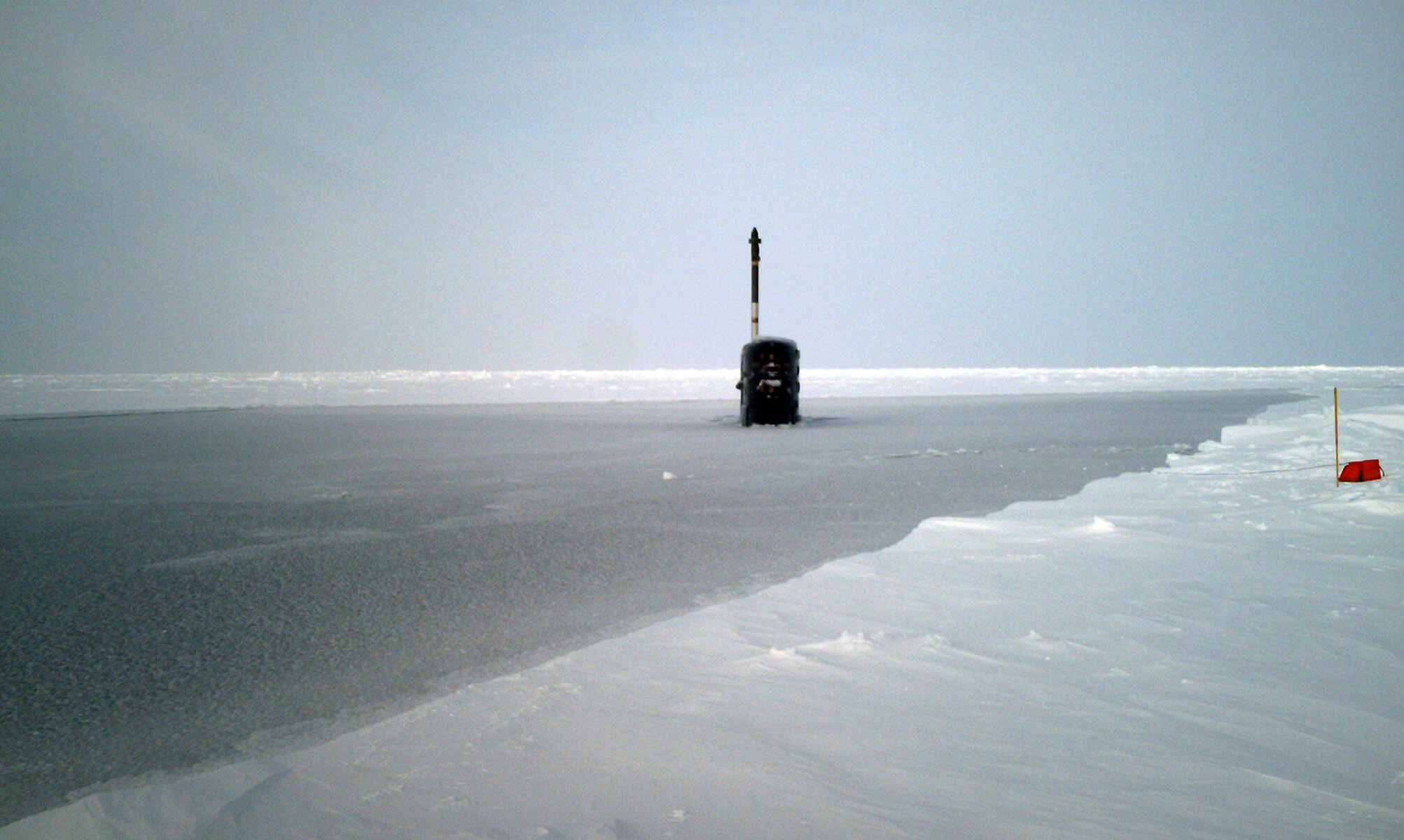
Tireless surfaces in arctic ice, 2007 during ICEX-07

=== Primary coolant leak ===
In May 2000, Tireless developed a serious leak in the nuclear reactor primary cooling circuit, although there was no leak of radioactive material. The nuclear propulsion system was shut down and using backup diesel power Tireless made way to Gibraltar. The damage was found to be more extensive than first thought, and the boat remained there pending repairs. This created diplomatic tension between Spain and Britain, until the submarine departed on 7 May 2001 after almost a year of extensive repairwork. During that year, all Trafalgar-class submarines were inspected for similar problems.

=== Collision with iceberg ===
On 13 May 2003, while on exercise in the Arctic and travelling at a depth of 60 metres, Tireless collided with an iceberg. There was no prior warning of the impending collision from passive sonar or other onboard sensors. The submarine's bow was forced down nine degrees and the vessel subsequently broke free of the iceberg at a depth of 78 metres. Some damage was sustained to the upper section of the boat. Before the incident, the Royal Navy had not conducted under-ice operations since 1996.

On 19 April 2004, Tireless and USS Hampton rendezvoused under the Arctic ice and surfaced together at the North Pole.

Tireless again angered Spain in 2004 when the boat put into Gibraltar from 9 to 15 July for what was explained as "technical reasons." Britain assured Spain that the port call was unrelated to the British celebrations, on 21 July, of the 300th anniversary of Spain handing over Gibraltar to Britain.

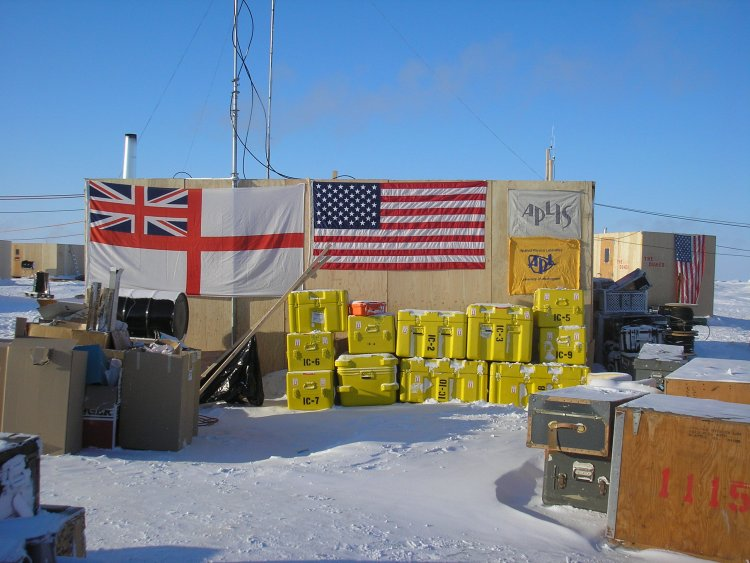
Flags from the APLIS Camp

=== March 2007 explosion ===
In 2007 Tireless ventured to the North Pole with USS Alexandria to participate in the Applied Physics Laboratory Ice Station (APLIS). On 21 March, two Tireless crew members, Leading Weapons Engineer Paul McCann and Weapons Engineer 2 Anthony Huntrod (Weapons Submariner) were killed in an explosion on board, apparently caused by an oxygen generator candle in the forward section of the submarine. The boat was in service near the North Pole under ICEX-07 along with the USS Alexandria and had to make an emergency surface through the ice cap. A third crewmember suffered "non life-threatening" injuries and was airlifted to a military hospital at Elmendorf Air Force Base near Anchorage, Alaska.

According to the Royal Navy, the accident did not affect the submarine's nuclear reactor, and the boat sustained only superficial damage. Part of the exercise was being used to measure ice thickness by using sonar. The film Stargate: Continuum—which was filming on the ice and in the Alexandria during the exercise—was dedicated to McCann and Huntrod.

=== 2010-2011 deployment ===
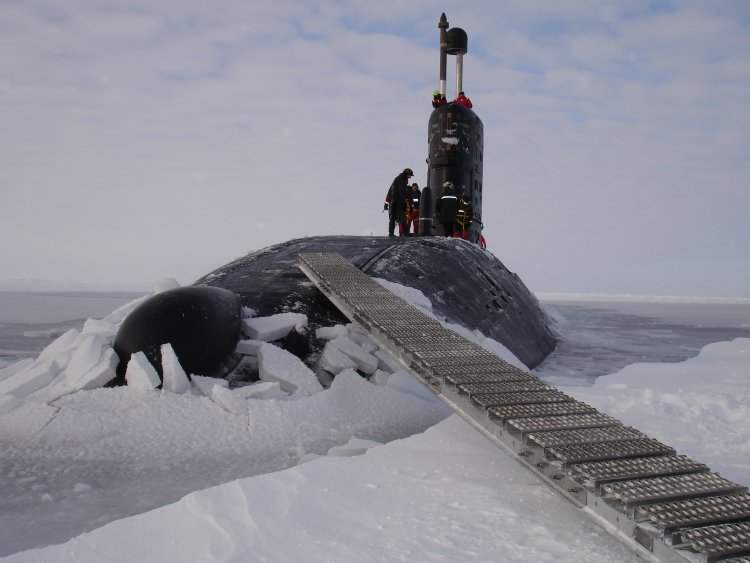
Tireless at the North Pole

From 9 July 2010 to 12 May 2011, Tireless undertook a ten-month deployment, spending 253 days at sea, the longest conducted by a Royal Navy submarine in ten years. During the deployment the boat passed through the Suez Canal for the first time, provided protection for the French aircraft carrier Charles de Gaulle launching aircraft over Afghanistan, and called into the ports of Fujairah in the United Arab Emirates, Goa in India and Souda Bay in Crete. Tireless was also involved in a multi-nation anti-submarine exercise in the Gulf of Oman which saw the Australian frigate HMAS Melbourne and the French frigate FS Dupleix attempt to locate the submarine.

=== 2012 South Atlantic deployment ===
In February 2012, it was reported that either Tireless or HMS Turbulent was being deployed to the Falkland Islands amid increasing tension between Argentina and the United Kingdom over sovereignty of the islands.

However HMS Tireless surfaced in Southampton in March, conducting towed array sonar calibration and testing in the Bay of Biscay before returning to Devonport.

=== 2013 Coolant leak ===
In early 2013 Tireless experienced a "small coolant leak that was contained within the sealed reactor compartment", requiring a return to HMNB Devonport for repair.

=== 2013 Mediterranean deployment ===
Tireless was spotted off the Rock of Gibraltar amidst the tensions between Spain and the UK over the disputed territory of Gibraltar. It was suggested that this SSN could be a key vessel used to strike Syria if military action occurred.

=== 2014 Indian Ocean search - Malaysian Airlines flight MH370 ===
On 1 April 2014, Tireless arrived in the southern Indian Ocean to join the search for a missing Malaysian airliner, where its sophisticated underwater listening equipment was used in an unsuccessful attempt to detect the underwater locator beacon of the aircraft's flight recorders.

=== Final return to Plymouth ===
On 1 June 2014 Tireless returned to Plymouth for the last time before decommissioning, and was formally decommissioned on 19 June.

Tireless' final operations saw visits to Gibraltar, Crete, India, Jordan, the UAE and Australia.

Tireless was moved in 2020 to a basin within Devonport dockyard often referred to as "the graveyard".
