= Prudhoe Bay oil spill =

Alaskan oil spill of 2006

Coordinates: 70.307288°N 148.798313°W

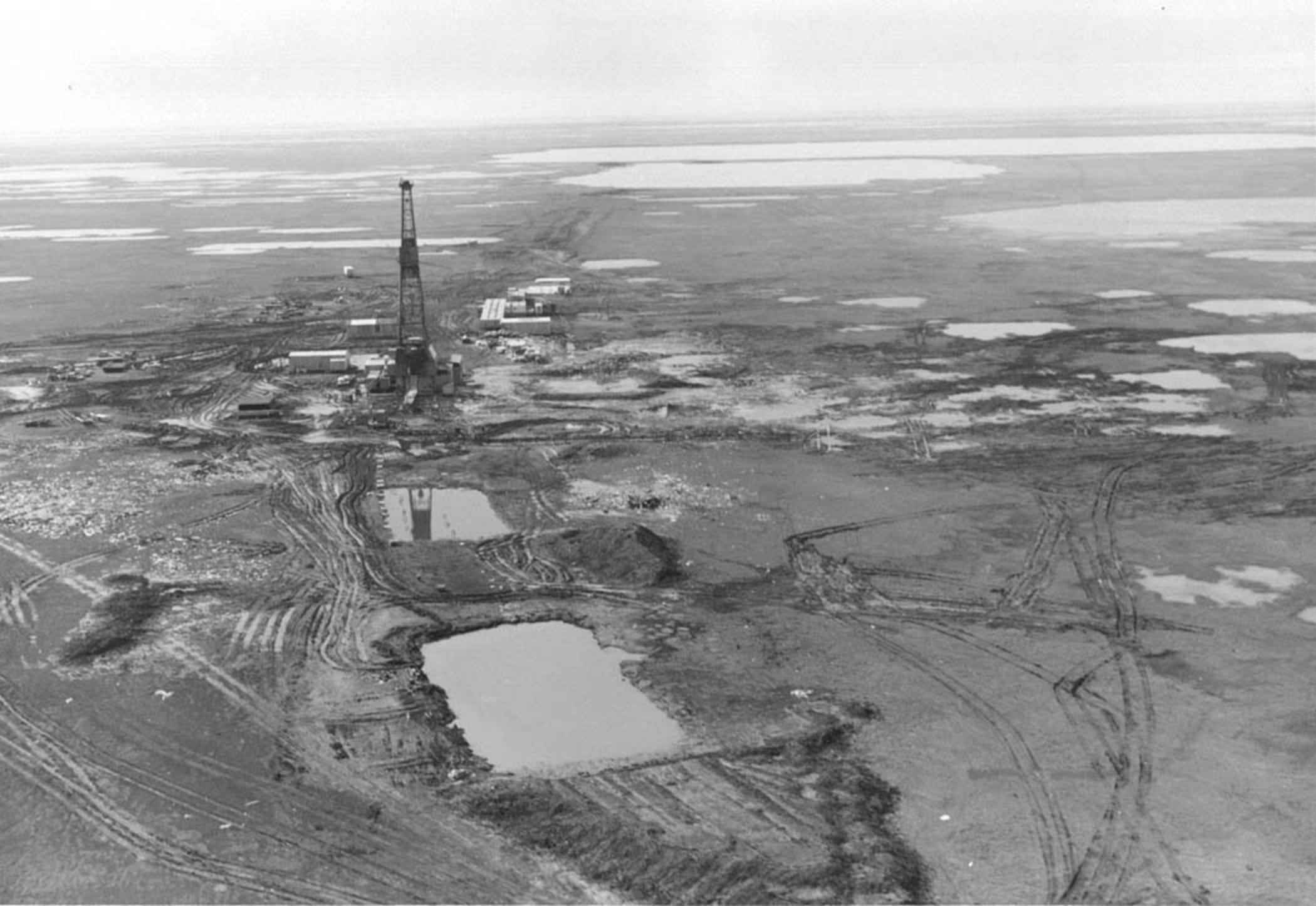
Aerial view of Prudhoe Bay

The Prudhoe Bay oil spill (2006 Alaskan oil spill) was an oil spill that was discovered on March 2, 2006, at a pipeline owned by BP Exploration, Alaska (BPXA) in western Prudhoe Bay, Alaska. Initial estimates of the five-day leak said that up to 267,000 US gallons (6,400 bbl) were spilled over 1.9 acres (7,700 m^{2}), making it the largest oil spill on Alaska's north slope to date. Alaska's unified command ratified the volume of crude oil spilled as 212,252 US gallons (5,053.6 bbl) in March 2008. The spill originated from a 0.25-inch (0.64 cm) hole in a 34-inch (86 cm) diameter pipeline. The pipeline was decommissioned and later replaced with a 20-inch (51 cm) diameter pipeline with its own pipeline inspection gauge (pig) launch and recovery sites for easier inspection.

In November 2007, BPXA pleaded guilty to negligent discharge of oil, which prosecutors said was the result of BP's knowing neglect of corroding pipelines, a misdemeanor under the federal Clean Water Act, and was fined US$20 million. In July 2011, BPXA paid a $25 million civil penalty, the largest per-barrel penalty at that time for an oil spill, and agreed to take measures to significantly improve inspection and maintenance of its pipeline infrastructure on the North Slope to reduce the threat of additional oil spills. In November 2012, it was announced that the U.S. state of Alaska would collect $255 million related to BP Plc's pipeline leaks and a resulting shutdown in 2006. BP's share was $66 million since it would pay the award and then be reimbursed by partners, including Exxon Mobil Corp and ConocoPhillips, based on their proportionate share of ownership.

== Prudhoe Bay oil field ==
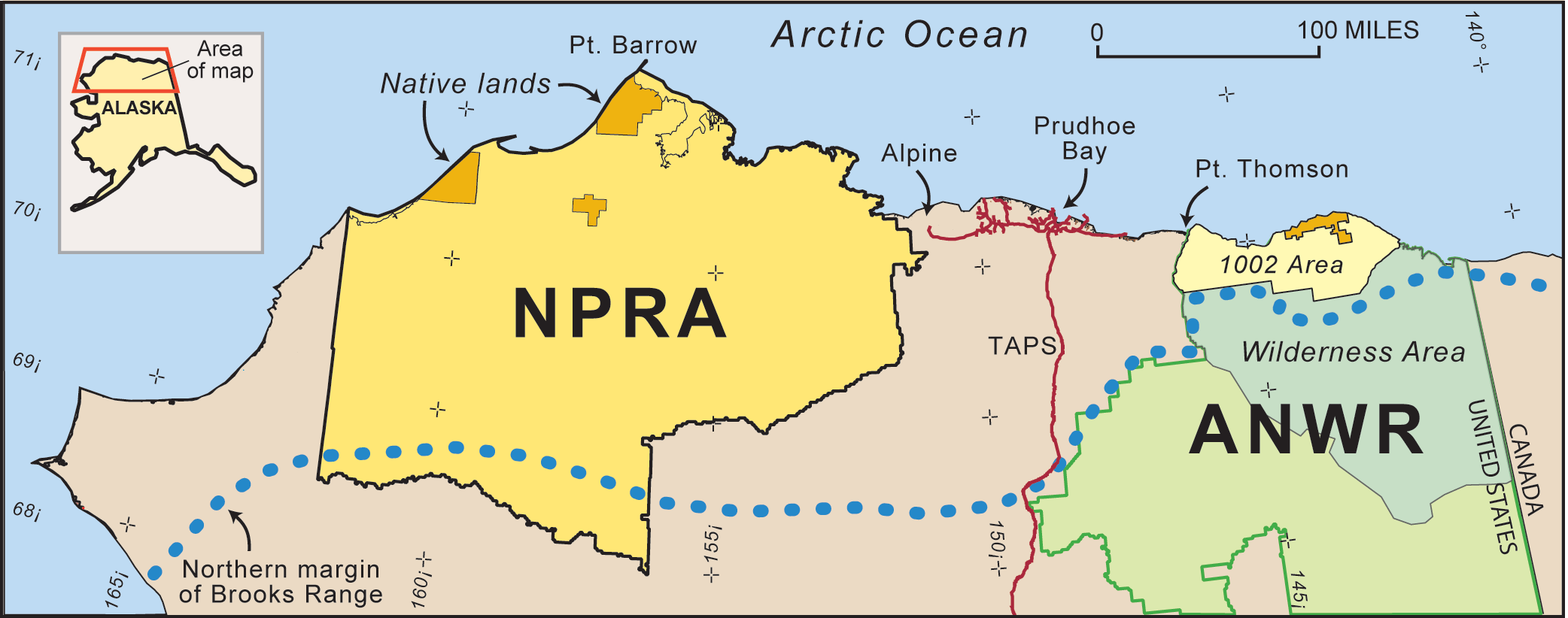
A map of northern Alaska; the dotted line shows the southern boundary of the North Slope - the Brooks Range. The National Petroleum Reserve -Alaska is to the West, the Arctic National Wildlife Refuge to the east, and Prudhoe Bay is between them. Red lines are pipelines.

The Prudhoe Bay oil field is located on Alaska's North Slope and lies between the National Petroleum Reserve–Alaska to the west and the Arctic National Wildlife Refuge to the east. It is home to thousands of migratory birds, caribou, and other creatures. It is owned by the State of Alaska, and is the largest oil field in the United States, covering 213,543 acres (86,418 ha) and originally containing approximately 25 billion barrels (4.0×10^{9} m^{3}) of oil. The field is operated by BP; partners are ExxonMobil and ConocoPhillips.

In the field, oil is moved through pipelines from about 1000 wells, to a pumping station at the head of the Trans-Alaska Pipeline; "flow lines" carry oil from the wells to local processing centers where the oil is prepared for long-range transport through the pipeline by removing water and gas; "transit lines" then carry the oil to the pumping station. There are about 8 miles of transit line in the Western Operating Area, connecting Gathering Center 2 (at the western end of the line) to Gathering Center 1, and then running to the pumping station, where the transit line ends.

Oil transit lines must be regularly cleaned and inspected for corrosion. Corrosion inhibitor chemicals are added to the flow to discourage the growth of bacteria which cause microbiological corrosion. Regular cleaning is done through the use of a maintenance "pig", a device that passes through a pipeline, scraping and cleaning the inside walls. In addition, maintenance also includes the occasional use of a "smart pig", a device that contains instruments that can measure and test the condition of the pipeline, including the detection of corrosion damage. Ultrasonic testing and the use of "corrosion coupons" are also used to detect corrosion. Ultrasonic testing involves the use of an ultrasonic device to measure the thickness of the pipeline wall—a thinning of the wall indicates the presence of corrosion. A corrosion coupon is a small metal plate placed inside the pipeline and inspected for corrosion every 90 days.

== Warnings ==
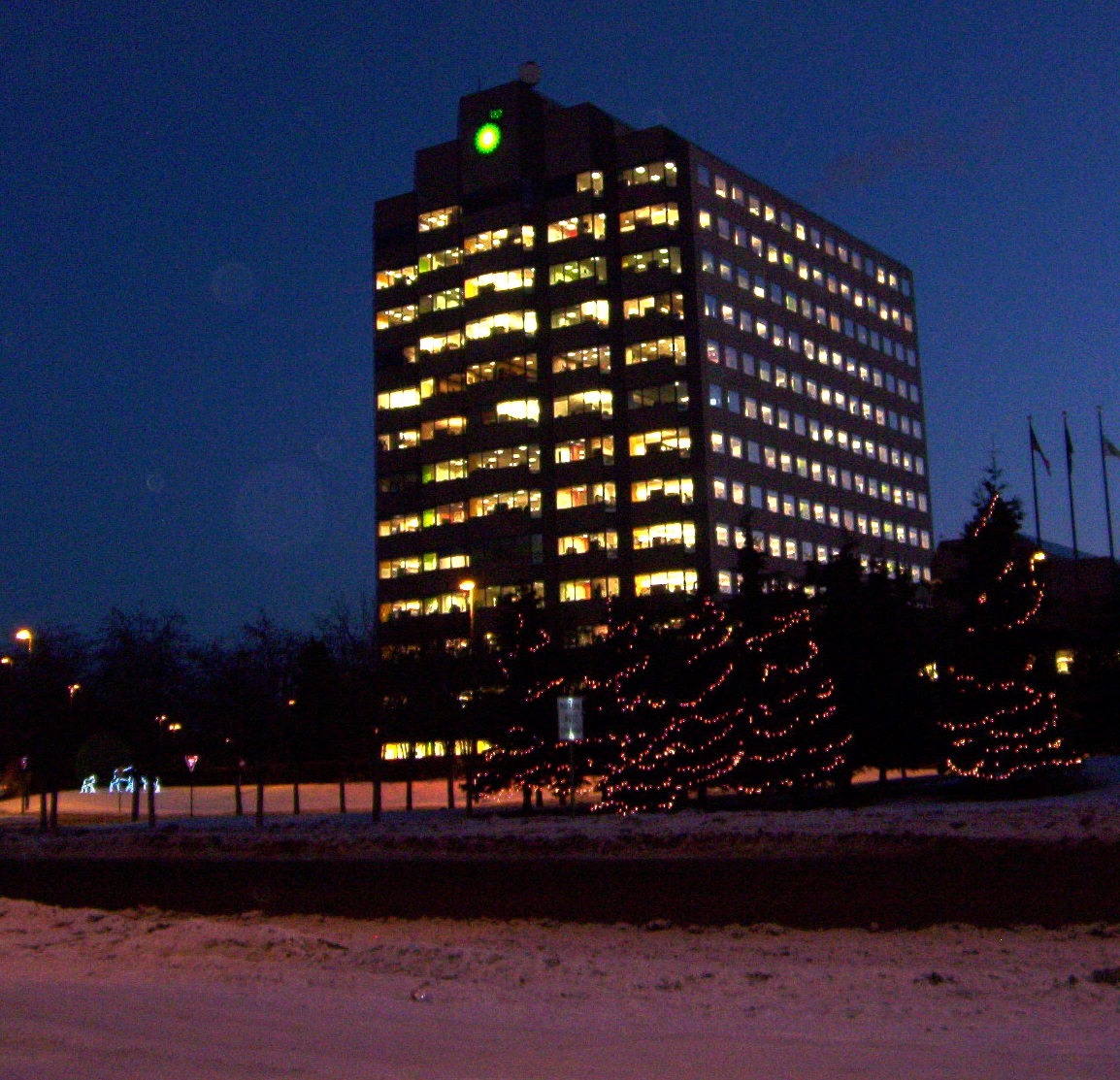
BP Alaska headquarters in Anchorage

Red flags and warning signs had been raised about corrosion on several occasions both from within and outside the organization but had been ignored. The 1992 tests on the eastern line had indicated the presence of calcium in the line, but nothing was done about it. A company report in year 2005 said BP based its corrosion-fighting on a limited budget instead of needs.

Employees had raised their concerns before the actual incident, which were ignored by BP management. In an e-mail to a company lawyer in June 2004, Marc Kovac, an official of the United Steelworkers union representing workers at the BP facility, forwarded a collection of his earlier complaints to management. One of these, dated February 28, 2003, concerned "corrosion monitoring staffing levels". It began, "The corrosion monitoring crew will soon be reduced to six staff down from eight." Initially BP denied that it took money-saving measures maintaining the pipeline. Robert Malone, the chairman of BP America, cited a report commissioned by BP which concluded that "budget increases alone would not have prevented the leak". He later admitted that there "was a concerted effort to manage the costs in response to the continuing decline in production at Prudhoe Bay". One of the reasons for the pipeline failure was an insufficient level of corrosion inhibitor, a liquid which resists corrosion of pipeline by the corroding liquid, which is water. John Dingell read from an internal BP email that said budgetary constraints would force the end of a programme to inject corrosion inhibitor directly into the pipeline system. The process of injecting corrosion inhibitor directly into a pipeline, though costly, is much more effective than injecting in a process plant.

In the subsequent investigation, Carolyn Merritt, chief executive officer of the U.S. Chemical Safety and Hazard Investigation Board, told the committee that "virtually all" of the root causes of the problems at Prudhoe Bay had "strong echoes" of those that led to the 2005 explosion in Houston. These had included cost cutting and a failure to invest in the plant. The committee was also told that the spillage happened at a time when BP was making huge profits.

The leak detection system measures the volumes of fluid entering each pipeline segment and the volumes of fluid leaving each segment. The system triggers an alarm if the volume measurements do not match up. The leak detection alarm sounded four times during the week before the spill was discovered, but BP interpreted the leak detection alarms as false alarms.

== Oil spill and Unified Command Final Report ==
The spill was first discovered at 5:45 AM, March 2, 2006, by a BP operator who was driving on a road along the pipeline and noticed the smell. It took three days for workers to discover the source of the oil. According to the Unified Command (consisting of several groups including BP, Alaska Department of Environmental Conservation and the U.S. Environmental Protection Agency) Final Report, "The source was a quarter inch hole at the 6 o'clock position in an above ground 34-inch diameter crude oil transit pipeline. The hole was discovered in the pipe within a buried culvert (caribou crossing)." The transit line ran between Gathering Center 2 and Gathering Center 1. The spill went undetected for as long as five days, according to a New York Times report of a BP press conference on the spill in mid-March 2006.

Subsequent investigation found a six-inch layer of sediment in the bottom of the pipe section. Investigators said that the sludge helped breed acidic bacteria and corrosion that ultimately ate though the pipe. BP executives said they were surprised that corrosion developed in the large trunk lines because they did not carry much water mixed with the oil. But they were aware that sediment was collecting and that leak technology would not work if the lines were not periodically cleaned. Federal and state authorities concluded that BP did not spend the money necessary to maintain the Prudhoe pipes.. Reports of the spill's volume varied widely at the time of the spill. On March 25, 2008, the Unified Command for spill response announced that the volume of crude oil spilled was 212,252 US gallons (5,053.6 bbl), making it more than three times larger than any spill ever reported on the North Slope.

Clean-up work was completed on May 2, 2006, and the site was backfilled and covered with a 4 to 6 inch layer of chunks of live, frozen tundra that were taken from a donor site and transplanted to the spill site Government environmental officials said it could take up to a decade for the tundra vegetation to return to normal.

BP decommissioned the entire 34-inch transit line and replaced it with a 20-inch line, containing pig launch and recovery sites.

== Immediate impact ==
The Alaska oil spill had a major impact on BP as it was a loss to its image as well as a financial loss. It came on the heels of the March 2005 Texas City refinery explosion. U.S. Chemical Safety Board chairman Carolyn Merritt said in a congressional hearing that there were striking similarities between the accidents of Texas City and Prudhoe Bay, including "long delays in implementation, administrative documentation of close-out even though remedial actions were not actually taken, or simple non-compliance" as well as "flawed communication of lessons learned, excessive decentralization of safety functions, and high management turnover." On March 15, 2006, the U.S. Transportation Department ordered BP to test its three low-pressure lines in Prudhoe Bay for corrosion using a smart pig. The western line had not been smart-pigged since 1998 and an eastern section of pipe had not been tested since 1992. Instead, BP relied on imprecise spot checks of the line using methods such as ultrasound testing. On August 7, BP announced data from a smart pig run completed in late July revealed severe corrosion and 16 anomalies in 12 locations in an oil transit line on the eastern side of the oil field. The company said that that information along with another small spill prompted it to shut down the Prudhoe Bay oil field, which would reduce Alaska North Slope oil production by an estimated 400,000 barrels per day. Later, BP decided not to shut the western side of the field, meaning Prudhoe Bay would still produce about 200,000 barrels a day, half its normal total. Oil revenue accounts for 90% of Alaska's tax income.

As a result of news of the shutdown, the price of crude oil on NYMEX jumped US$2.22 a barrel closing at US$76.98 per barrel. Following the Prudhoe Bay pipeline leak in March 2006, due to slow progress in stopping the oil spill, BP was forced to shut down its Prudhoe Bay oil facility, which produced about 2.6% of the United States demand for gasoline. The scenario was a contributing factor for pushing the price of oil to US$77 per barrel in August 2006.

The impact of the leak was so severe that BP shares slumped nearly 2 percent. BP estimated that it would cost US$100 million to replace the 16 miles (26 km) of corroded pipeline. The company had to face tough questions from the public and shareholders about why the $200 million a year it spent in maintenance was not enough to keep the 400,000-barrel-per-day (64,000 m^{3}/d) field, the country's largest, running smoothly.

== Consequences ==
PrudhoeBayBPOperations

In August 2006, BP came up with an Action Plan which was outlined in a letter sent to Thomas Barrett, administrator for pipeline safety for Department of Transportation's Pipeline and Hazardous Materials Safety Administration (PHMSA). BP's Steve Marshall detailed measures for pigging or removing oil residue from the pipeline and for various draining and dismantling procedures.

In February 2007, BP officials said that they were still working to determine the root cause of the leaks. At that time the investigation findings included water in the system, sediment buildup in the lines, and bacteria. Slow velocity in the lines was also an issue as the lines had been designed for much greater flow rates as were present when the wells were first opened. BP also announced a planned maintenance-repair budget for the Greater Prudhoe Bay area of $195 million for 2007, roughly four times what was spent in 2004. The company said it had plans to replace 16 miles/26 km of transit lines with a new system designed to eliminate some of the problems that contributed to corrosion, such as caribou crossings that cause dips in the line. It also announced plans to change the environment in the pipes with continuous corrosion inhibitor added directly to the transit lines and with water or sediment buildup addressed with weekly maintenance pig runs; a new leak detection system; and new pig launchers and receivers in all segments of the transit lines, giving BP the capability to regularly run maintenance and smart pigs in all segments of the transit lines. Two segments of the transit system were scheduled to be replaced in 2007 and two in the winter of 2008, with a goal to have the entire module work completed by the end of 2008.

In October 2007, BP was fined US$20 million for the Prudhoe Bay oil spills. BP paid a $12 million federal criminal fine, $4 million in criminal restitution to the state, and $4 million for Arctic research. BP's local subsidiary, BP Exploration (Alaska) Inc., was placed on probation for three years.

In 2008 BP announced that it had completed replacing 16 miles/26 km of the Prudhoe Bay transit lines and the other work as planned.

== Subsequent spill in 2009 ==
On November 9, 2009, a spill occurred from an 18-inch three-phase common line carrying a mixture of crude oil, produced water, and natural gas at BP's Lisburne field, part of the greater Prudhoe Bay area. BP's preliminary estimate for the total volume of oily material released was 45,828 gallons (1,091 barrels); there were 13,500 gallons (321 barrels) of crude. The spill occurred because the pipe froze. Although sensors provided alarms of cold temperatures, BP employees testified that operators did not use the cold alarms as a measure of flow, but rather as a measurement of the mixture of oil, gas, and water. In November 2010 BP's federal probation officer filed suit to revoke BP's probation stemming from the guilty plea for the 2006 spill, which could have led to further penalties for the 2006 spill, on the grounds that the 2009 Lisburne spill showed that BP was still negligent. BP challenged the revocation and the probation was lifted as planned in December 2011.

== 2011 civil suit ==
In the settlement of a civil suit, in July 2011 investigators from the U.S. Department of Transportation's Pipeline and Hazardous Materials Safety Administration (PHMSA) determined that the 2006 spills were a result of BPXA's failure to properly inspect and maintain the pipeline to prevent corrosion. PHMSA issued a Corrective Action Order (CAO) to BP XA that addressed the pipeline's risks and ordered pipeline repair or replacement. The U.S. Environmental Protection Agency had investigated the extent of the oil spills and oversaw BPXA's cleanup. When BP XA did not fully comply with the terms of the CAO, a complaint was filed in March 2009 alleging violations of the Clean Water Act, the Clean Air Act and the Pipeline Safety Act. In July 2011, the U.S. District Court for the District of Alaska entered a consent decree between the United States and BPXA resolving the government's claims. Under the consent decree, BPXA paid a $25 million civil penalty, the largest per-barrel penalty at that time for an oil spill, and agreed to take measures to significantly improve inspection and maintenance of its pipeline infrastructure on the North Slope to reduce the threat of additional oil spills.

== Alaskan lawsuit settlement ==
In November 2012, it was announced that the U.S. state of Alaska would collect $255 million related to BP Plc's pipeline leaks and a resulting shutdown in 2006. BP's share was $66 million since it would pay the award and then be reimbursed by partners, including Exxon Mobil Corp and ConocoPhillips, based on their proportionate share of ownership. The payment, which was final and not subject to appeal, included a $245 million award for lost state royalties and interest and $10 million which included per-gallon environmental penalties for the spills, fines for natural resource damages and other civil charges to settle civil assessments for the spills. BP argued that no money was owed to the state for lost production, but the arbitration panel concluded that the pipeline problems and associated reservoir complications resulted in lost or deferred production of more than 30 million barrels of oil and natural-gas liquids until the end of the oil field's life.

== See also ==
- Exxon Valdez oil spill
