= Mount Elbert Gas Hydrate Site =

Gas hydrate site in Alaska, U.S.

Mount Elbert Methane Hydrate Site (or Mount Elbert Gas Hydrate Test Well, Mount Elbert test well) is a natural gas test site within the Alaska North Slope. The well was first drilled in 2007 as part of a Cooperative Research Agreement with BP Exploration (Alaska), Inc. (BPXA) and the U.S. Department of Energy (DOE) in collaboration with the U.S. Geological Survey (USGS). The aim was to help determine whether natural gas hydrate in the area can become a commercially viable gas resource. Results so far are promising.

== Site Highlights ==
- First dedicated gas hydrate stratigraphic test well on the Alaska North Slope;
- First application of extended duration, open-hole wireline pressure testing using Modular Dynamics Testing in a gas hydrate-bearing reservoir;
- 504 feet (154 m) of core collected (100 feet (30.5 m) hydrate bearing);
- Confirmation of the existence of 60–75% hydrate saturation within reservoir quality sands in target intervals;
- Validation of methods used to identify potential hydrate occurrence;
- Confirmed the formation's ability to produce gas from hydrate through pressure reduction;
- Well data enabled reservoir modeling simulations of a heterogeneous, complex natural gas hydrate-bearing reservoir system at the well and field-scales.

== Introduction to the Area ==
The Alaska North Slope region (ANS) is largely known for its remote Arctic wildlife and setting, and prolific petroleum production from the Prudhoe Bay oil fields. However, natural gas hydrate accumulations on the North Slope are increasingly the focus of energy resource and climate studies, both of which seek to understand how much hydrate is located within this region and how those deposits may respond to natural and/or induced changes in pressure and/or temperature. The North Slope region lies north of the Brooks Range and is bounded by the Beaufort and the Chukchi Seas to the north and west, and the Canada–US border to the east. While the ANS is remote, recent research in the region has offered groundbreaking insights concerning the potential to predict and identify significant occurrences of natural gas hydrates (NGH) in subsurface reservoirs, as well as its future production potential.

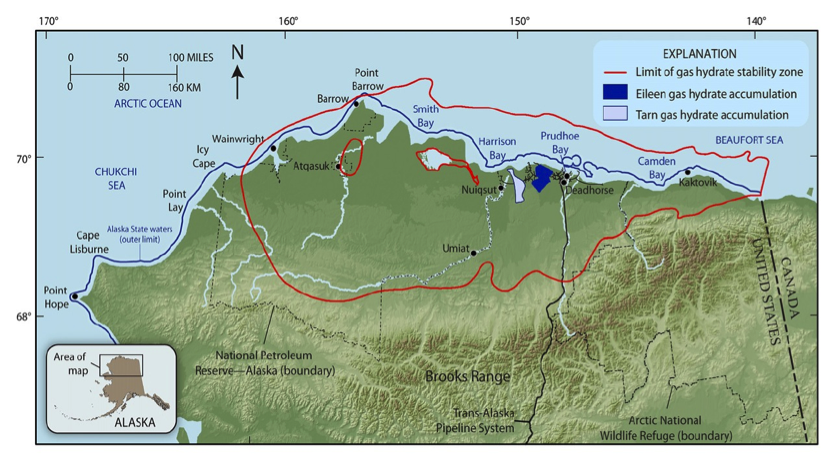
Overview of the Northern Alaska Gas Hydrate total petroleum system

== General physical and geological description ==
The Alaska North Slope region was identified by the USGS as an important hydrate-bearing region in the United States. Current USGS estimates indicate ~85 trillion cubic feet (2,400 km^{3}) (Tcf) of technically recoverable gas resources from hydrate accumulations in this region. Drilling within the greater Prudhoe Bay region has enabled the delineation and evaluation of two trends in particular that have been the focus of recent studies, the Eileen and Tarn trends. The Eileen trend was first indicated by dedicated gas hydrate evaluation conducted in the Northwest Eileen State #2 exploration well in 1972 by Arco and Exxon. Evaluation of data from hundreds of industry well logs enabled Collett to identify a number of extensive gas hydrate-bearing sand horizons that occurred largely below the base of permafrost. Subsequently, drilling problems with the 1991 Cirque-1 well confirmed the occurrence of extensive gas hydrates commingled with the permafrost (the Tarn trend) in an area just west to the Eileen accumulations. These natural gas hydrate trends coincide with portions of established oil reservoirs within the Prudhoe Bay Oil Field (Prudhoe Bay Unit - PBU), Kuparuk River Unit (KRU), and Milne Point Unit (MPU) and are situated within and beneath a thick layer of permafrost at a depth of up to 600 meters below the surface. This area is located along the northernmost boundary of the Colville Basin, which initially formed during a Jurassic-Cretaceous rifting event that resulted in the separation of the North American margin to the south and the Arctic Composite Terrane to the north. Due to a slow but constant subsidence rate and a relatively steady flux of clastic sediments into the Colville Basin, the basin has grown and evolved during the last 120 million years and is now bounded by the Brooks Range mountain front to the south and east and by the Barrow Arch to the north, which roughly follows the Alaskan-Beaufort coastline.

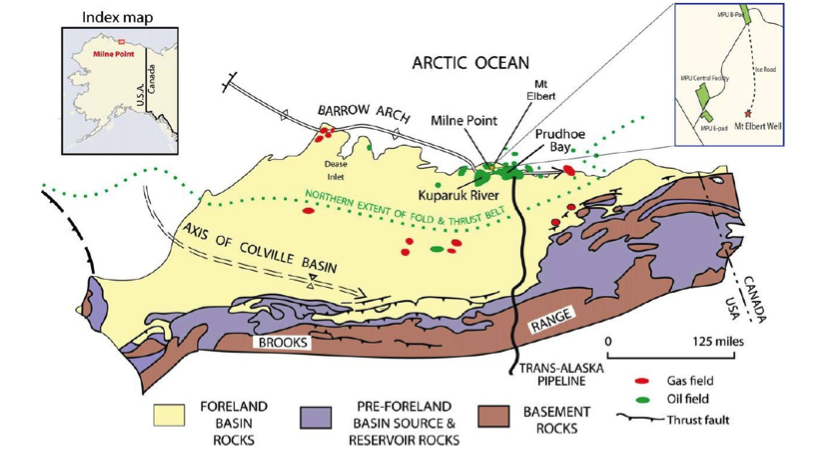
Overview of the major geologic and geographic features influencing the deposition and structural features of the sedimentary section on the Alaska North Slope

In the Arctic, gas hydrates may occur naturally onshore in association with permafrost regions, and at or below the seafloor in marine sediments. In the case of permafrost-associated settings in northern Alaska and Canada, gas hydrate occurrences have been identified in sand-rich units deposited in near-shore and onshore environments. Unlike the majority of gas hydrate occurrences around the world it is believed that many of the sand-rich Arctic deposits on the North Slope were originally conventional free-gas accumulations. During the last glacial period these formerly free-gas reservoirs likely became trapped as hydrates as atmospheric and subsurface temperatures dropped. The geometry, host-reservoir, and physical and chemical properties of the modern natural gas hydrate occurrences point to a conversion of conventional free-gas accumulations when they were cooled down to a point that was well within the hydrate stability conditions, and hydrates could form (see UNEP Global Outlook on Methane Gas Hydrates (2012, in progress) for more details and also Collett et al., 2011 for a full synopsis on Alaska North Slope gas hydrates).

== The Mount Elbert Gas Hydrate Scientific Research Well, ANS ==
The Mt. Elbert Gas Hydrate Stratigraphic Test Well, part of the “Methane Hydrate Research and Development (R&D) Program,” was located on the Alaska North Slope within the Milne Point Unit of the greater Prudhoe Bay Oil Field. The well was drilled as part of a larger cooperative agreement between the U.S. Department of Energy (DOE) and BP Exploration Alaska (BPXA), in collaboration with the U.S. Geological Survey (USGS) and several universities and industry partners, to evaluate whether natural gas hydrate from the Alaska North Slope could be viably produced either technically or commercially. The site was selected based on geological and geophysical evaluations that identified the Mount Elbert site as a fault-bounded gas hydrate trap with two prospective sand-rich reservoirs. The project assembled a team of scientists from the USGS, DOE, BPXA, Oregon State University, and RPS Energy to collect and evaluate core samples, geophysical well logs, and pressure-test data designed to help determine the nature of gas hydrate reservoirs and their potential response to likely production techniques in preparation for expected future exploration on the North Slope.

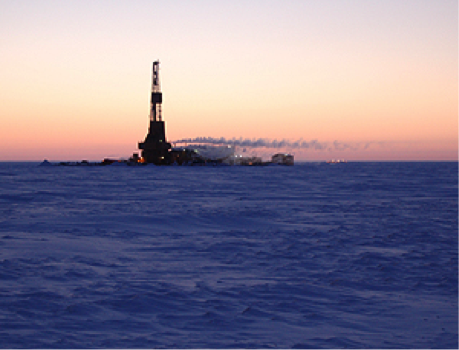
Image of the Mount Elbert drilling site from far

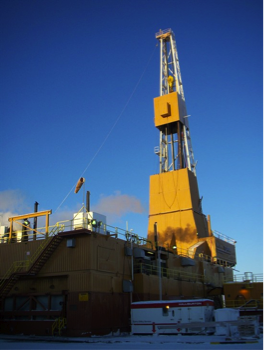
Image of the Mount Elbert drilling rig

The Mount Elbert Gas Hydrate Stratigraphic Test Well was drilled from an ice pad constructed to protect sensitive arctic tundra with drilling operations designed to verify the nature of one of fourteen gas hydrate prospects previously identified by the project within the Milne Point Unit. The Doyon 14 rig began drilling of the test well on February 3, 2007. Field operations included the acquisition of a full suite of Wireline logs, over 150 meters of continuous core, and formation pressure test data and concluded field operations on February 21, 2007. The well was drilled vertically to a depth of 914 meters below land surface. Subsequent analysis of the logging data confirmed the existence of a total of approximately 30.5 meters (100 ft) of combined 60-75% saturated gas hydrate-bearing sand in two distinct reservoirs. The hydrates in these sand-rich intervals in the North Slope region mainly occur as pore-filling material in sand reservoirs. Geochemical studies revealed the gas trapped in ANS hydrate accumulations is predominantly thermogenic methane that likely migrated upwards along faults and fractures into shallower reservoirs from the existing, deeper subsurface oil and natural gas accumulations of the North Slope region. The combined scientific results of the field program are reported in the February 2011 (Volume 28, Number 2) issue of Elsevier's Journal of Marine and Petroleum Geology.

== The importance of Mount Elbert as an active study site ==
Mount Elbert, as a gas hydrate research site, is the first dedicated NGH test well that was drilled on the North Slope of Alaska. The results from the Mount Elbert test well showed that scientists’ efforts to predict where and how much NGH exists in the subsurface using conventional subsurface datasets, such as wireline logs and 3D seismic data were successful in predicting reservoir thickness and general methane hydrate gas saturations. It supported the conclusion that conventional subsurface exploration tools and techniques are adaptable for NGH exploration on the ANS and may also be used to prospect for methane hydrate accumulations in other regions around the globe (More information can be found in NETL's "Energy resource potential of methane hydrates".

The Mount Elbert field program also marked the first time that a team of scientists on Alaska's North Slope performed a short-term downhole Modular Dynamics Formation Test (MDT) that confirmed the ability of gas hydrate-bearing formation to release gas through depressurization and provided additional information to complement the earlier tests conducted at the Mallik site in 2002. The results of the MDT test provided key insights into the reservoir response of natural hydrate formations to pressure reduction. Data from the Mount Elbert field test have since been utilized to complete reservoir modeling simulations of an heterogeneous, complex natural gas hydrate-bearing reservoir system at both the well and field-scales. Overall, the operational and technical successes at the Mount Elbert site provided further impetus for industry-government partnerships in gas hydrate research that leverage the existing infrastructure and knowledge base developed through 30 years of industry development on the Alaska North Slope.
