= USS Alexandria (SSN-757) =

Los Angeles-class nuclear-powered attack submarine of the US Navy

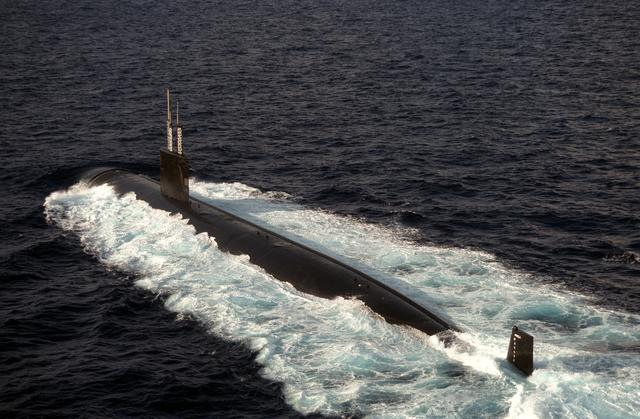
- USS Alexandria (SSN-757)

History

United States
- Name: USS Alexandria
- Namesake: Alexandria, Virginia, and Alexandria, Louisiana
- Awarded: 26 November 1984
- Builder: General Dynamics Electric Boat
- Laid down: 19 June 1987
- Launched: 23 June 1990
- Sponsored by: Mrs. Myrtle "Tookie" Clark
- Acquired: 13 June 1991
- Commissioned: 29 June 1991
- Decommissioned: 29 June 2026
- Motto: Twice as Strong
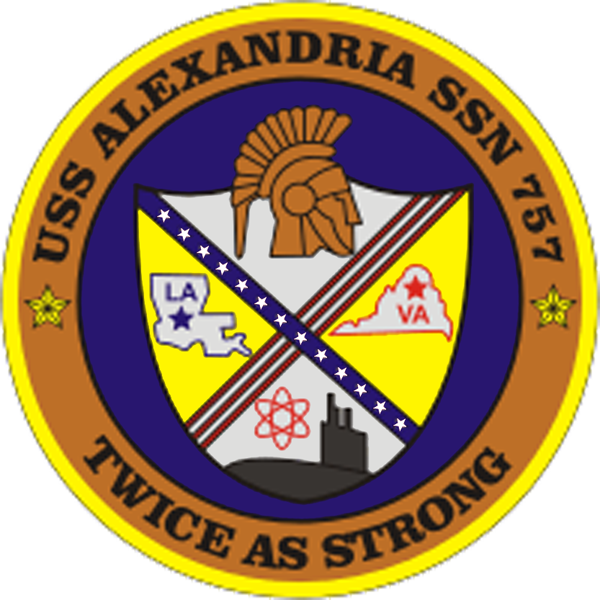
- Badge

General characteristics
- Class & type: Los Angeles-class submarine
- Displacement: Surfaced: 6,082 tons; Submerged: 6,927.57 tons
- Length: 362 ft (110 m)
- Beam: 33 ft (10 m)
- Draft: 31 ft (9 m)
- Propulsion: 1 × S6G PWR nuclear reactor with D2W core (165 MW), HEU 93.5%; 2 × steam turbines (33,500) shp; 1 × shaft; 1 × secondary propulsion motor 325 hp (242 kW)
- Speed: Surfaced: 25 kn (46 km/h; 29 mph)+; Submerged: 25 kn (46 km/h; 29 mph)+ (official); 33 kn (61 km/h; 38 mph)+ (reported)
- Range: Refueling required after 30 years
- Test depth: Greater than 757 ft (231 m)
- Complement: 16 officers, 127 enlisted
- Sensors & processing systems: BQQ-10 passive sonar, BQS-15 detecting and ranging sonar, WLR-8 fire control radar receiver, WLR-9 acoustic receiver for detection of active search sonar and acoustic homing torpedoes, BRD-7 radio direction finder
- Electronic warfare & decoys: WLR-10 countermeasures set
- Armament: 4 21 in (533 mm) bow tubes, 10 Mk48 ADCAP torpedo reloads, Tomahawk land attack missile block 3 SLCM range 1,700 nmi (3,148 km; 1,956 mi), Harpoon anti–surface ship missile range 70 nmi (130 km; 81 mi), mine laying Mk67 mobile mine & Mk60 captor mines
- Notes: The third ship of the United States Navy to be named for both Alexandria, Virginia, and Alexandria, Louisiana

USS Alexandria (SSN-757), was a Los Angeles class nuclear-powered attack submarine and the third vessel of the United States Navy to be named for both Alexandria, Virginia, and Alexandria, Louisiana. The contract to build her was awarded to the Electric Boat Division of General Dynamics Corporation on 26 November 1984. Her keel was laid down in Groton, Connecticut, on 19 June 1987. She was launched on 23 June 1990, sponsored by Mrs. Myrtle "Tookie" Clark, wife of Vice Admiral Glenwood Clark (ret.), and commissioned on 29 June 1991. Alexandria was placed in service on 22 March 1991. A series of sea trials began 16 April and were completed 4 June. The Navy announced it would inactivate the Alexandria on 4 August 2026.

== Service history ==
Alexandria, together with the guided-missile cruiser USS Cowpens (CG-63), guided-missile frigate USS Gary (FFG-51), and P-3C Orion maritime patrol and reconnaissance aircraft, participated in Exercise Malabar 2004, a training exercise with the Indian Navy off the southwest coast of India that ended on 11 October 2004.

In March 2007 Alexandria was participating in the joint U.S. Navy/Royal Navy Ice Exercise 2007 (ICEX-2007), conducted in the Arctic Ocean with the Trafalgar-class submarine HMS Tireless (S88). The exercise took place on and under a drifting ice floe, about 180 nmi (330 km; 210 mi) off the north coast of Alaska. The two submarines were taking part in joint testing of submarine operability and tactical development in Arctic waters. On 21 March 2007, Tireless experienced an explosion of a self-contained oxygen generation candle, she suffered only superficial damage, but two crew members were killed and one injured.

Film set

Some scenes for the movie Stargate: Continuum were filmed on board Alexandria. The then-captain of Alexandria, Commander Mike Bernacchi, and members of his crew played themselves. The ship was also used as a filming location for the JAG and NCIS TV series, although she was referred to there as the fictional USS Cathedral City.

Decommissioning

USS Alexandria was decommissioned on June 29, 2026. She arrived in Bremerton on July 13, 2026.

== Gallery ==
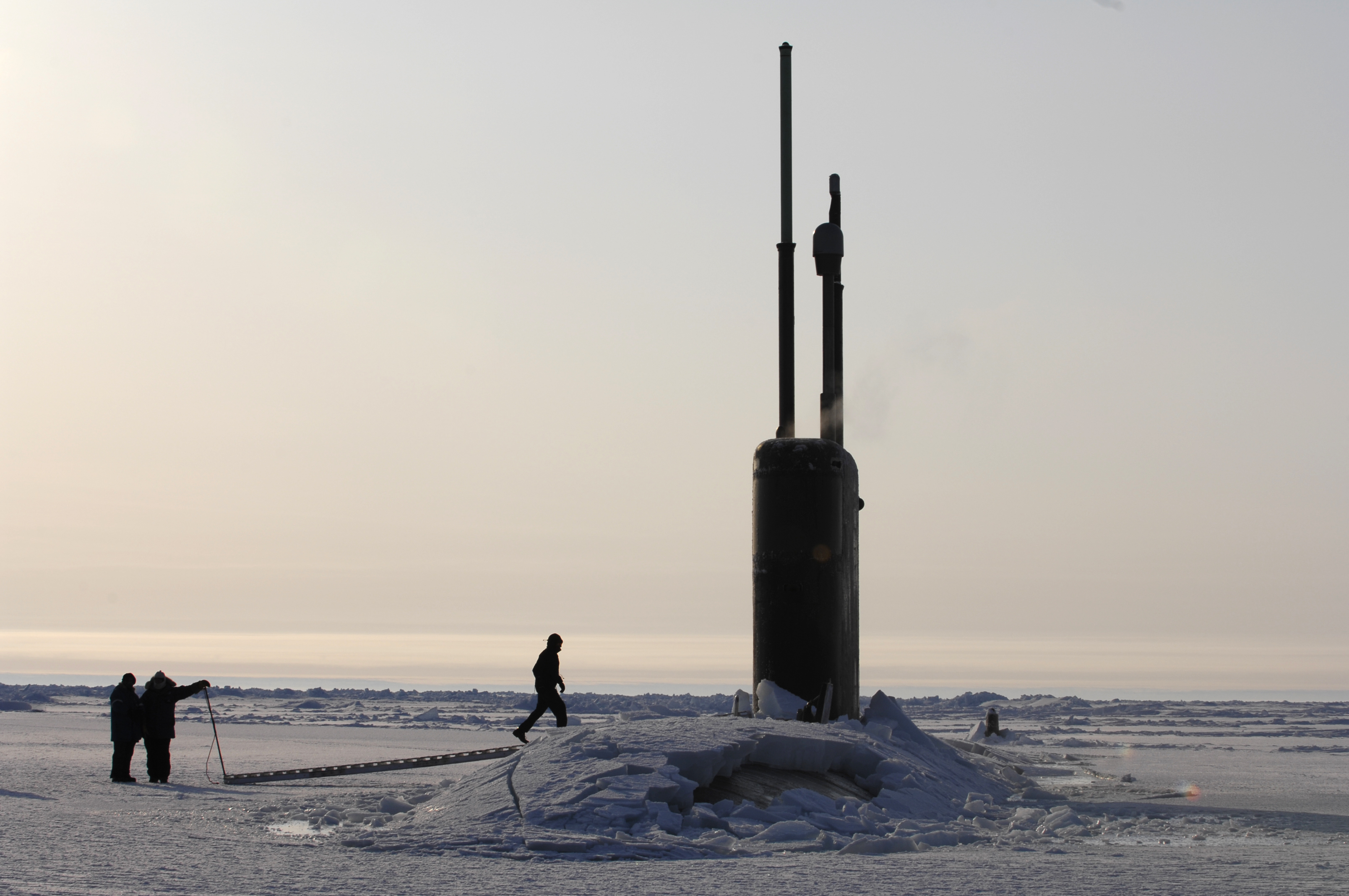
Alexandria submerged after surfacing through 2 ft (60 cm) of ice during ICEX-07, a joint U.S. Navy/Royal Navy exercise.

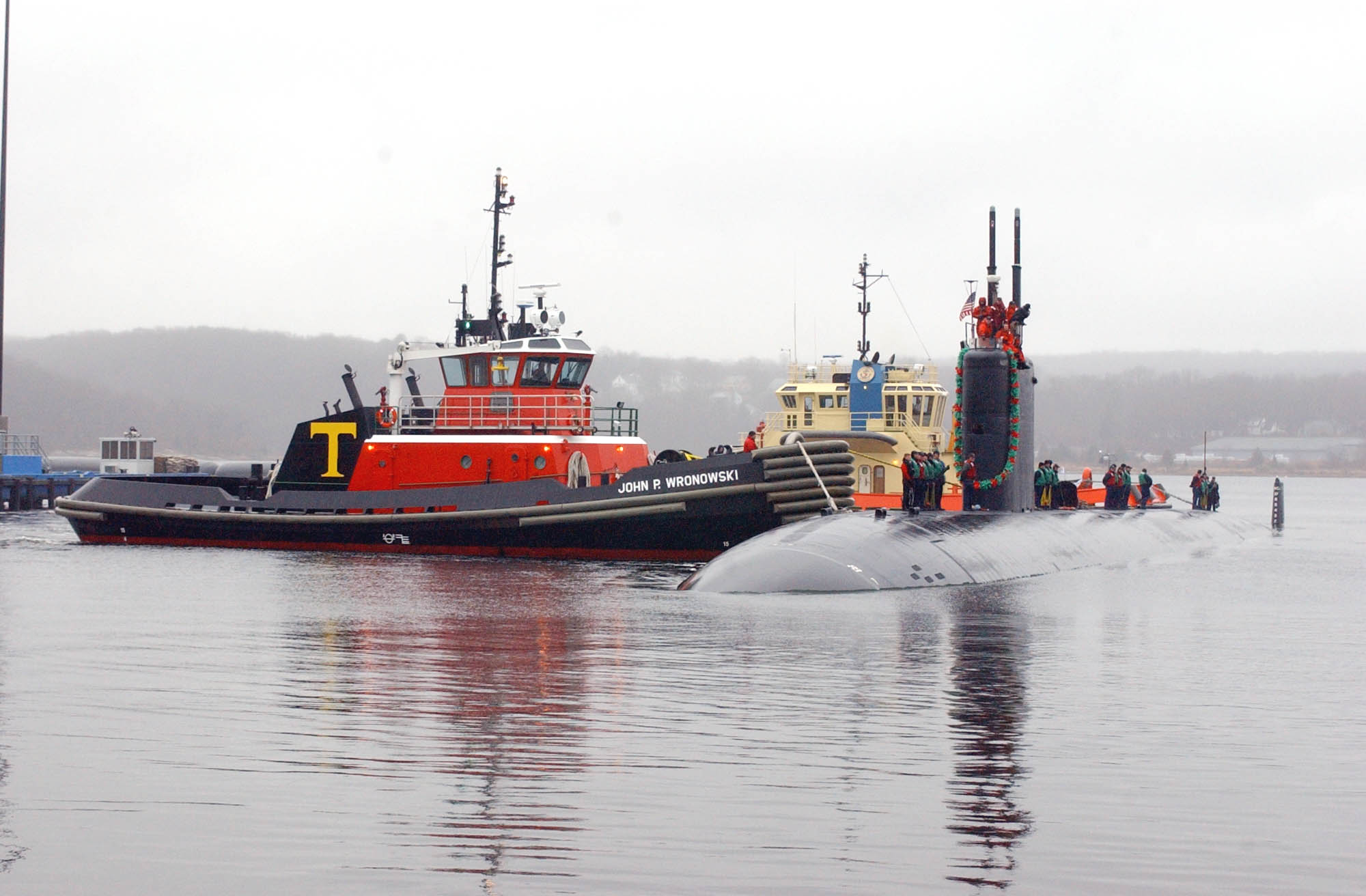
Alexandria returns home to New London, CT.
