= Prudhoe Bay, Alaska =

Census-designated place in Alaska

- CDP
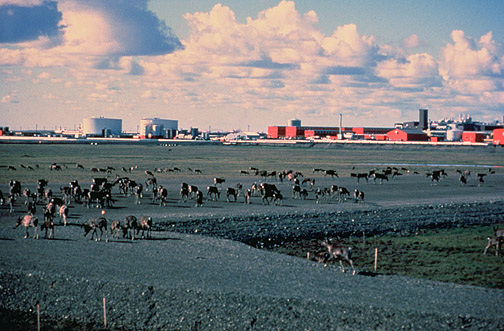
- Caribou walk across a gravel pad at Kuparuk, 45 miles (72 km) away from Prudhoe Bay, with oilfield facilities in the background.

- Location in North Slope Borough and the state of Alaska

- Location in the United States of America
- Coordinates: 70°19′32″N 148°42′41″W
- Country: United States
- State: Alaska
- Borough: North Slope

Government
  - Borough mayor: Josiah Patkotak
  - State senator: Donny Olson (D)
  - State rep.: Robyn Burke (D)

Area
  - Total: 569.89 sq mi (1,476.00 km^{2})
  - Land: 390.41 sq mi (1,011.17 km^{2})
  - Water: 179.47 sq mi (464.83 km^{2})
- Elevation: 26 ft (7.9 m)

Population (2020)
  - Total: 1,310
  - Density: 3.4/sq mi (1.3/km^{2})
- Time zone: UTC-9 (Alaska (AKST))
  - Summer (DST): UTC-8 (AKDT)
- ZIP code: 99734
- Area code: 907 (Local exchange prefix: 659)
- FIPS code: 02-64380
- GNIS feature ID: 2419192

Prudhoe Bay /ˈpruːdoʊ/, also known as Deadhorse, is a town located in North Slope Borough in the U.S. state of Alaska. As of the 2020 census, the population of the CDP was 1,310 people, down from 2,174 residents in the 2010 census, and up from just 5 residents in 2000; however, at any given time, several thousand transient workers support the Prudhoe Bay Oil Field. Rigs and processing facilities are located on scattered gravel pads laid atop the tundra. It is only during winter that the surface is hard enough to support heavy equipment, and new construction happens at that time.

Overland access to Prudhoe Bay/Deadhorse is by the Dalton Highway from Fairbanks, 495 miles (797 km) south, or Deadhorse Airport. As the bay itself is still 10 miles (16 km) further north through a security checkpoint, open water is not visible from the highway. A few tourists, arriving by bus or their own vehicles after a two-day ride up the Dalton Highway from Fairbanks, come to see the tundra, the Arctic Ocean and the midnight sun, staying in lodgings assembled from modular buildings. Tours must be arranged in advance to see the Arctic Ocean and the bay itself.

Companies with facilities in Deadhorse service Prudhoe Bay, nearby oil fields, and the Trans-Alaska Pipeline System (TAPS), which brings oil from Prudhoe Bay to Valdez on the south-central Alaska coast. Facilities are built entirely on man-made gravel pads and usually consist of pre-fabricated modules shipped to Deadhorse via barge or air cargo.

Prudhoe Bay was named in 1826 by British explorer Sir John Franklin after his classmate Captain Algernon Percy, Baron Prudhoe. Franklin traveled westerly along the coast from the mouth of the Mackenzie River in Canada almost to Point Barrow.

== Geography ==
Prudhoe Bay/Deadhorse is located on the Sagavanirktok River.

According to the United States Census Bureau, the CDP has a total area of 558.0 sq mi (1,445 km^{2}) of which, 416.3 sq mi (1,078 km^{2}) is land and 141.8 sq mi (367 km^{2}) is water. The total area is 25.40% water.

== History ==
The Prudhoe Bay, Alaska, area was developed to house personnel, provide support for drilling operations, and transport oil to the Alaskan pipeline. Prior to 1977, oil seeps (small pores or fissure networks through which liquid petroleum emerges at the surface of the land) on the Arctic coastal plain had caught the attention of the U.S. petroleum interests. The U.S. Navy drilled for oil between 1944 and 1953 with little success. In 1967, after several attempts at drilling for oil, oil company mergers, and competitive bidding for state lease sales, the Prudhoe Bay oil field was discovered.

Sources conflict on the origin of the name Deadhorse. The most cited theory appears to be that the area takes its name from a local business prominent in the late 1960s and 1970s, the "Dead Horse Haulers" trucking company. How the trucking company got its name remains in dispute.

In February 2023, a "high altitude object" about the size of a small car was shot down near the area after a decision by President Joe Biden.

== Climate ==
Like all of the North Slope, Prudhoe Bay/Deadhorse features a cold and dry tundra climate (Köppen ET). Winters are long and frigid, and because the area is above the Arctic Circle, the sun does not rise during several weeks of each winter. Summers bring long daylight hours, with 24 hours of daylight during some summer weeks, but are still not warm, being mostly between 45 and 55 °F (7 and 13 °C) and sometimes dropping to the freezing point. The hottest month, July, has a daily average temperature of only 48 °F (9 °C), although Deadhorse reaches 80 °F (27 °C) on average once every four years. Deadhorse averages four days per year where temperatures reach 70 °F (21 °C) or more. Since 1968, the only years that failed to reach that mark were 1972 and 1980. Precipitation is very light, averaging only 5.70 in (144.8 mm), including only 23.73 in (60.3 cm) of snow – less snowfall than even the warmest places in the Alaska Panhandle like Ketchikan. The mean annual temperature is 14 °F (−10 °C), with maximum temperatures reliably remaining below freezing from early/mid October to late April. As the area is located in USDA Plant Hardiness Zone 2, temperatures below −40 °F (−40 °C) can be expected during the height of winter.

- Longest day: 63 days, 23 hours, 40 minutes (12:09 a.m. on May 20 to 11:18 p.m. on July 22)
- Shortest day: 45 min (11:42 a.m. to 12:27 p.m. on November 24)
- Longest night: 54 days, 22 hours, 51 min (12:27 p.m. on November 24 to 11:18 a.m. on January 18)
- Shortest night: 26 min (11:43 p.m. on May 19 to 12:09 a.m. on May 20)
- Highest recorded temperature: 89 °F (32 °C) on August 6, 2024
- Lowest recorded temperature: −62 °F (−52 °C) on January 27, 1989
- Highest wind speed recorded: 95 knots (109 mph; 176 km/h) on February 25, 1989
- Official lowest wind chill: −102 °F (−74 °C) on January 28, 1989 (air temperature of −54 °F (−48 °C)) and wind speed of 31 kn (36 mph; 57 km/h)

Climate data for Prudhoe Bay, Alaska
Month	Jan	Feb	Mar	Apr	May	Jun	Jul	Aug	Sep	Oct	Nov	Dec	Year
Record high °F (°C)	36 (2)	39 (4)	34 (1)	43 (6)	55 (13)	83 (28)	82 (28)	89 (32)	67 (19)	45 (7)	39 (4)	34 (1)	89 (32)
Mean maximum °F (°C)	19 (−7)	17 (−8)	16 (−9)	28 (−2)	43 (6)	65 (18)	74 (23)	69 (21)	56 (13)	37 (3)	24 (−4)	20 (−7)	77 (25)
Mean daily maximum °F (°C)	−11.9 (−24.4)	−10.1 (−23.4)	−5.2 (−20.7)	10.1 (−12.2)	28.8 (−1.8)	45.2 (7.3)	55.4 (13.0)	51.0 (10.6)	38.3 (3.5)	21.0 (−6.1)	0.9 (−17.3)	−6.6 (−21.4)	18.1 (−7.7)
Daily mean °F (°C)	−18.0 (−27.8)	−17.2 (−27.3)	−12.8 (−24.9)	2.7 (−16.3)	23.9 (−4.5)	39.0 (3.9)	47.8 (8.8)	44.3 (6.8)	33.6 (0.9)	15.4 (−9.2)	−5.1 (−20.6)	−12.9 (−24.9)	11.7 (−11.3)
Mean daily minimum °F (°C)	−24.0 (−31.1)	−24.3 (−31.3)	−20.3 (−29.1)	−4.8 (−20.4)	19.0 (−7.2)	32.7 (0.4)	39.7 (4.3)	37.5 (3.1)	28.9 (−1.7)	9.7 (−12.4)	−11.0 (−23.9)	−19.2 (−28.4)	5.3 (−14.8)
Mean minimum °F (°C)	−44 (−42)	−47 (−44)	−43 (−42)	−30 (−34)	−1 (−18)	25 (−4)	31 (−1)	29 (−2)	17 (−8)	−13 (−25)	−30 (−34)	−38 (−39)	−50 (−46)
Record low °F (°C)	−62 (−52)	−57 (−49)	−54 (−48)	−47 (−44)	−19 (−28)	18 (−8)	28 (−2)	23 (−5)	1 (−17)	−30 (−34)	−45 (−43)	−47 (−44)	−62 (−52)
Average precipitation inches (mm)	0.20 (5.1)	0.17 (4.3)	0.14 (3.6)	0.08 (2.0)	0.09 (2.3)	0.39 (9.9)	0.68 (17)	1.14 (29)	0.61 (15)	0.38 (9.7)	0.18 (4.6)	0.20 (5.1)	4.26 (107.6)
Average snowfall inches (cm)	2.8 (7.1)	2.4 (6.1)	2.7 (6.9)	1.7 (4.3)	1.4 (3.6)	1.0 (2.5)	0.0 (0.0)	0.5 (1.3)	3.5 (8.9)	9.3 (24)	4.3 (11)	3.5 (8.9)	33.1 (84)
Source: Desert Research Institute

== Demographics ==
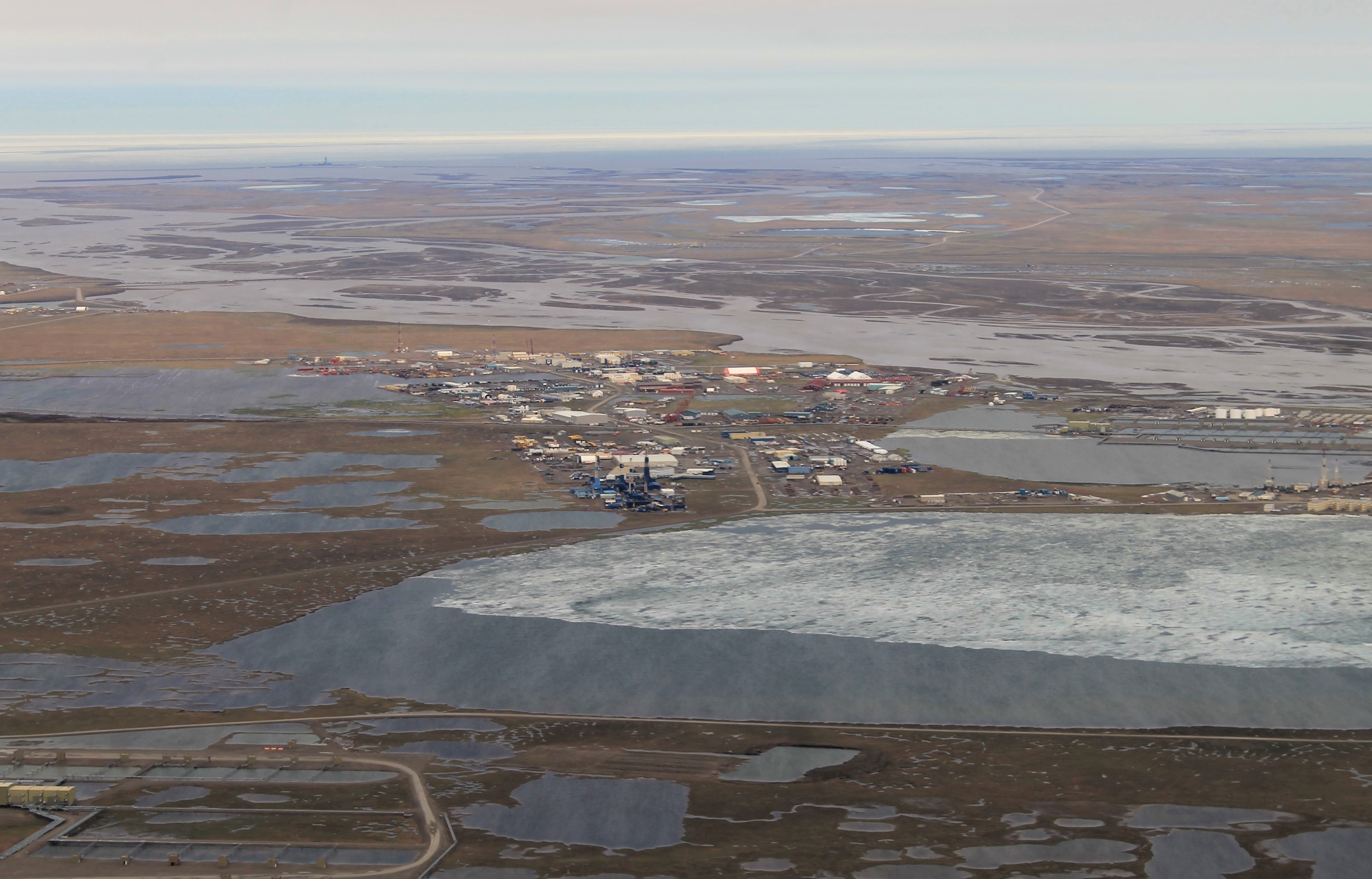
July 2018 aerial view of Prudhoe Bay

Historical population (Prudhoe Bay)
Census	Pop.	Note	%±
1970	49		—
1980	50		2.0%
1990	47		−6.0%
2000	5		−89.4%
2010	2,174		43,380.0%
2020	1,310		−39.7%
U.S. Decennial Census

Historical population (Deadhorse)
Census	Pop.	Note	%±
1970	163		—
1980	64		−60.7%
1990	26		−59.4%
U.S. Decennial Census

Both Prudhoe Bay and Deadhorse first appeared on the 1970 U.S. Census as an unincorporated village. They were made a census-designated place (CDP) in 1980. Deadhorse appeared last on the 1990 census. In 2000, it was merged into the Prudhoe Bay CDP.

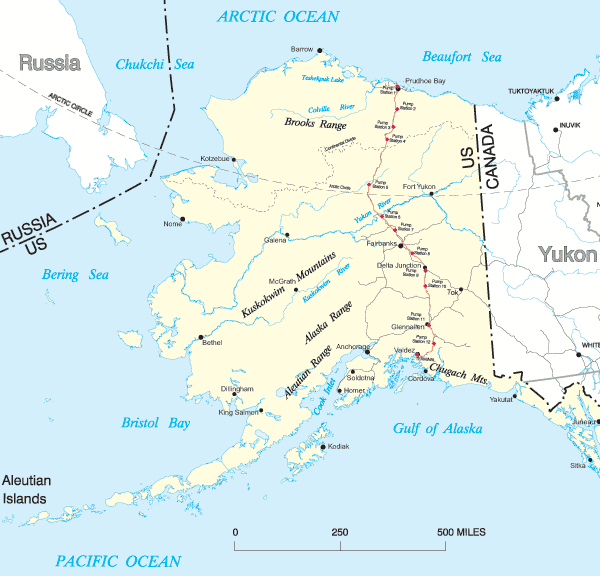
Map of Alaska, showing place names and the Trans-Alaska pipeline route in red

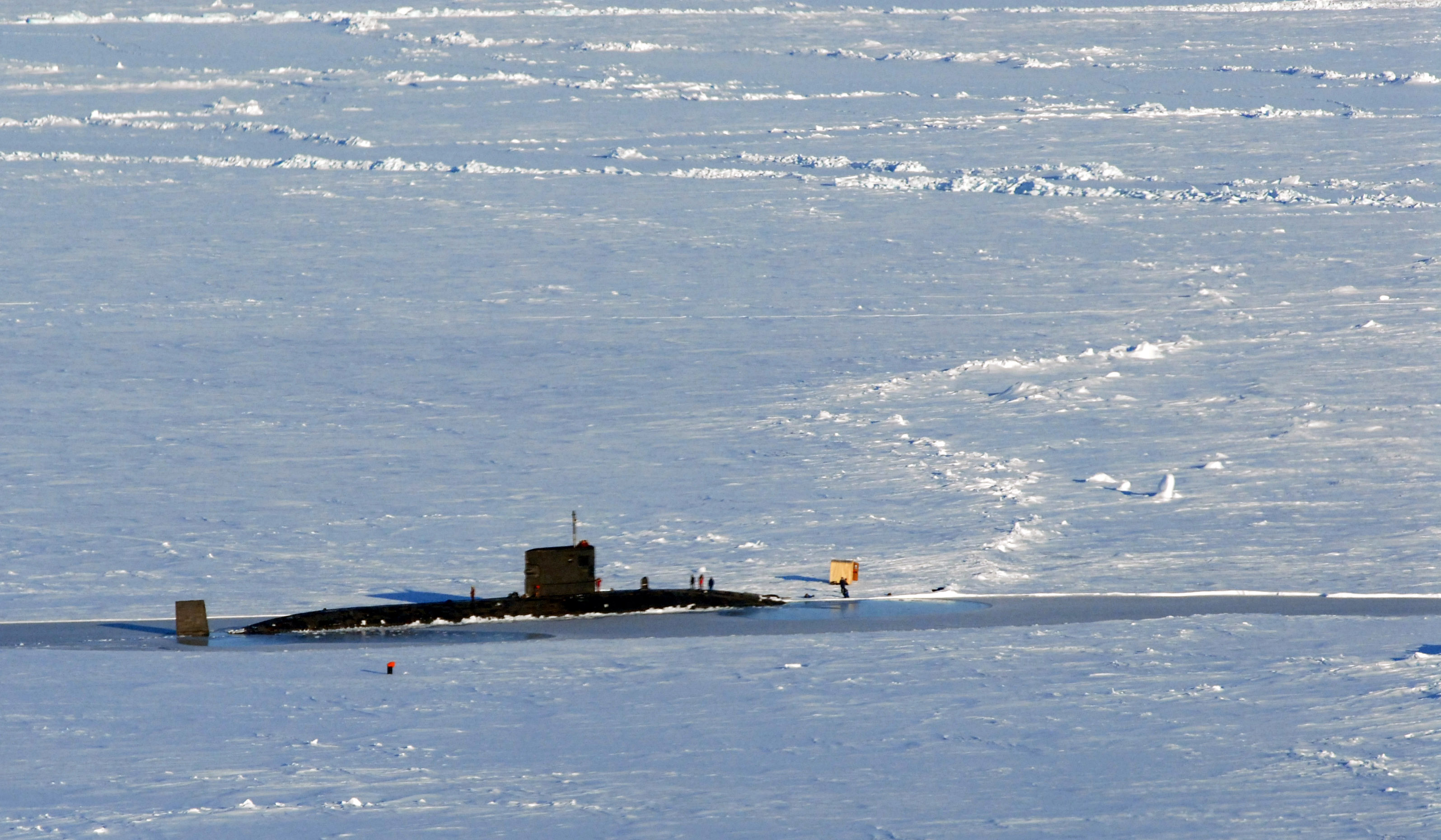
HMS Tireless on Prudhoe Bay

=== 2020 census ===
As of the 2020 census, Prudhoe Bay had a population of 1,310. The median age was 45.5 years. 0.7% of residents were under the age of 18 and 1.1% of residents were 65 years of age or older. For every 100 females there were 991.7 males, and for every 100 females age 18 and over there were 1021.6 males age 18 and over.

0.0% of residents lived in urban areas, while 100.0% lived in rural areas.

There were 0 households in Prudhoe Bay. No households had children under the age of 18. There were no households headed by a single male or single female householder. There were no one-person households, including anyone living alone who was 65 years of age or older.

There was 1 housing unit, and all were vacant (100.0%). The homeowner vacancy rate was 0.0% and the rental vacancy rate was 100.0%.

Racial composition as of the 2020 census
Race	Number	Percent
White	1,026	78.3%
Black or African American	31	2.4%
American Indian and Alaska Native	69	5.3%
Asian	15	1.1%
Native Hawaiian and Other Pacific Islander	23	1.8%
Some other race	40	3.1%
Two or more races	106	8.1%
Hispanic or Latino (of any race)	145	11.1%

=== 2010 census ===
As of the 2010 United States census, there were 2,174 people living in the CDP. The racial makeup of the CDP was 83.0% White, 1.9% Black, 7.5% Native American, 1.5% Asian, 0.1% Pacific Islander, 0.3% from some other race and 1.6% from two or more races. 4.0% were Hispanic or Latino of any race.

== Tourism and wildlife ==
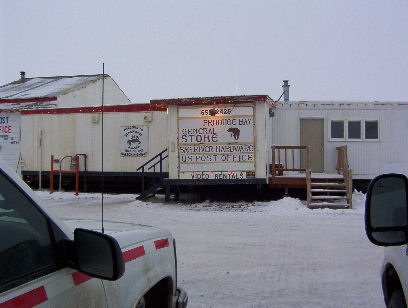
The general store in Deadhorse in 2003

Tourists traveling to Deadhorse and Prudhoe Bay typically take tour buses from Fairbanks via the James Dalton Highway, a two-day journey with an overnight stop in Coldfoot. During the summer months, visitors can arrange for tours to the Arctic Ocean via a guided tour only. There is no longer any public Arctic Ocean access from Deadhorse. All tours must be booked 24 hours in advance to allow time for background checks on all passengers going through the oilfield check point. Tourists can also experience the midnight sun due to Deadhorse's location above the Arctic Circle. In winter, the opposite phenomenon, polar night, occurs.

The area often features large herds of caribou and over 200 bird and waterfowl species, including geese, swans, gulls and eagles. Other indigenous wildlife include Arctic foxes, Arctic ground squirrels, grizzly bears, polar bears, musk oxen, and Arctic hares.

Because alcoholic beverages are not sold in Deadhorse, a humorous slogan for the town is "All that far and still no bar."

The town serves as a start/end or turn-around point of several motorcycle-riding challenges offered by the Iron Butt Association. One of these, the Ultimate Coast to Coast, gives riders 30 days to travel between Deadhorse and Key West (the southernmost city in the contiguous United States) in either direction.

== Deadhorse Airport ==
Deadhorse Airport (IATA: SCC, ICAO: PASC, FAA LID: SCC) is a public airport located in Deadhorse on the North Slope of Alaska. It is sometimes called Prudhoe Airport.

== Health care ==
Prudhoe Bay is classified as an isolated town/sub-regional center. It is found in EMS Region 6A in the North Slope Region. Emergency services have limited highway, coastal and airport access. Emergency service is provided by a paid emergency medical services unit and Fairweather Deadhorse Medical Clinic. Auxiliary health care is provided by oil company medical staff and the Greater Prudhoe Bay Fire Dept. Individuals requiring hospital care are usually transported to the nearest hospital/medical center, Sammuel Simmonds Memorial Hospital, in Utqiaġvik. Because no roads connect Prudhoe Bay to Utqiaġvik, patients are transported by helicopter or air ambulance (a flight of approximately 45 minutes).

== In popular culture ==
=== Comic books ===
- A highly fictionalized version of Deadhorse appears in the Deadhorse comic book series, by Eric Grissom, Phil Sloan, Marissa Louise, and David Halvorson.

=== Television ===
- Deadhorse is the subject of the second episode of America's Toughest Jobs
- Deadhorse is featured on the third through sixth seasons of Ice Road Truckers, a reality television series airing on the History Channel; it dramatizes trucking on the Dalton Highway and often features truckers transporting equipment to the oil companies located in or around the Prudhoe Bay area.
- It is briefly featured in the first, second, and third seasons of the BBC's Life Below Zero.
- It is featured in the first episode of the BBC's World's Most Dangerous Roads
- It is featured in the X-Files, season 2, episode 17: "End Game".

=== Music ===
- The album Deadhorse (Deluxe Edition) by the group Dirt Poor Robins occurs in Deadhorse.

== Image gallery ==
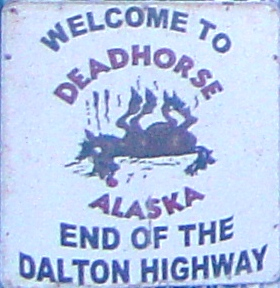
Sign at General Store, Deadhorse, Alaska (January 2008)

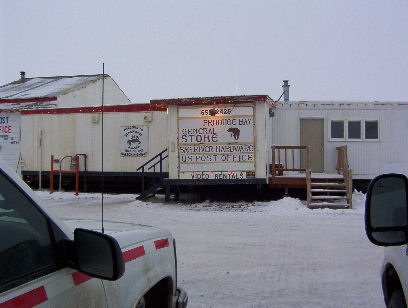
Deadhorse General Store (2003)

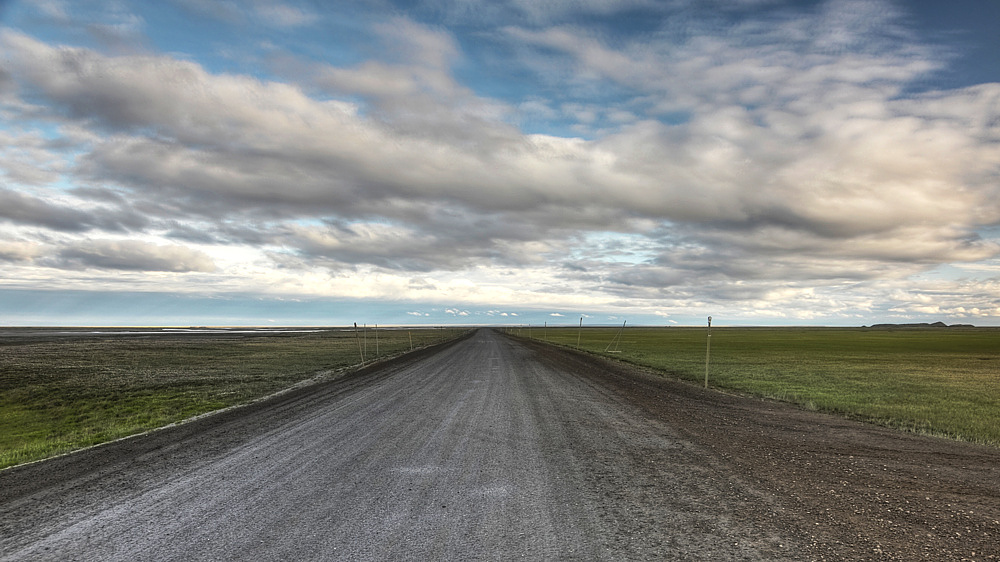
The Dalton Highway at Deadhorse (July 2010)

== See also ==
- 2006 Alaskan oil spill
- Alaska Pipeline
- Ice Road Truckers
