= Flaw lead =

Waterway opening between pack ice and fast ice

Flaw lead is an oceanographic term for a waterway opening between pack ice and fast ice. Flaw lead occurs annually at the time when central pack ice drifts from coastal ice, thereby creating the flaw. The process begins in autumn. Flaw leads can have interconnected polynyas. The Canadian government's Circumpolar Flaw Lead System Study, through the University of Manitoba examines the physical changes and their effects on biological processes with flaw leads.

A similar opening ("lead") can exist between pack ice and the shore, referred to as a shore lead.
