= National Register of Historic Places listings in North Slope Borough, Alaska =

Location of the North Slope Borough in Alaska

This is a list of the National Register of Historic Places listings in North Slope Borough, Alaska.

This is intended to be a complete list of the properties and districts on the National Register of Historic Places in North Slope Borough, Alaska, United States. The locations of National Register properties and districts for which the latitude and longitude coordinates are included below, may be seen in a Google map.

There are 18 properties and districts listed on the National Register in the borough, including 4 National Historic Landmarks.

This National Park Service list is complete through NPS recent listings posted September 4, 2026.

== Current listings ==
	Name on the Register	Image	Date listed	Location	City or town	Description
1	Aluakpak		March 18, 1980 (#80004555)	About 15 miles (24 km) south of Wainwright; 70°25′12″N 159°51′09″W	Wainwright	
2	Anaktuuk		March 18, 1980 (#80004556)	Address restricted	Wainwright	
3	Atanik		March 18, 1980 (#80004557)	On the shoreline of the Chukchi Sea, 20 miles (32 km) northeast of Wainwright; 70°50′35″N 159°21′36″W	Wainwright	
4	Avalitkuk		March 18, 1980 (#80004558)	Address restricted	Wainwright	
5	Birnirk Site	Birnirk Site	October 15, 1966 (#66000953)	Address restricted	Barrow	
6	Gallagher Flint Station Archeological Site	Gallagher Flint Station Archeological Site	June 16, 1978 (#78003208)	Address restricted	Sagwon	
7	Ipiutak Archeological District		May 25, 1979 (#79000411)	Address restricted	Point Hope	
8	Ipiutak Site	Ipiutak Site	October 15, 1966 (#66000157)	Address restricted	Point Hope	
9	Ivishaat		March 18, 1980 (#80004559)	Address restricted	Wainwright	
10	Kanitch		March 18, 1980 (#80004560)	Address restricted	Wainwright	
11	Leffingwell Camp Site	Leffingwell Camp Site	June 21, 1971 (#71001093)	About 58 miles (93 km) west of Kaktovik; 70°11′07″N 146°03′10″W	Flaxman Island	
12	Napanik		March 18, 1980 (#80004561)	Address restricted	Wainwright	
13	Negilik Site		April 15, 1980 (#80004562)	Address restricted	Wainwright	
14	Point Barrow Refuge Station	Point Barrow Refuge Station	December 2, 1980 (#80004563)	Along Brower Street, Browersville; 71°17′54″N 156°46′23″W	Barrow	
15	Prudhoe Bay Oil Field Discovery Well Site		March 23, 2000 (#00000264)	About 1.5 miles (2.4 km) northwest of Putuligayuk River mouth, along western shore of Prudhoe Bay; 70°19′27″N 148°32′28″W	Prudhoe Bay	
16	Rogers-Post Site	Rogers-Post Site	April 22, 1980 (#80004564)	Near Walakpa River mouth, about 11 miles (18 km) southwest of Barrow; 71°09′15″N 157°03′50″W	Barrow	
17	Utkeagvik Church Manse	Utkeagvik Church Manse	October 6, 1983 (#83003447)	1268 Church Street; 71°17′34″N 156°47′00″W	Barrow	
18	Uyagaagruk		March 18, 1980 (#80004565)	Address restricted	Wainwright	

== See also ==
- List of National Historic Landmarks in Alaska
- National Register of Historic Places listings in Alaska
