= Aluakpak =

Archaeological site in Alaska, United States

- U.S. National Register of Historic Places
- Alaska Heritage Resources Survey
- Location within Alaska
- Location: About 15 miles (24 km) south of Wainwright, Alaska
- Nearest city: Wainwright, Alaska
- Coordinates: 70°25′12″N 159°51′09″W
- Area: 142.3 acres (57.6 ha)
- NRHP reference No.: 80004555
- AHRS No.: WAI-012
- Added to NRHP: March 18, 1980

Aluakpak, also known as Coal Mine #3, is a historic Native Alaskan coal mine site in the North Slope Borough of Arctic Alaska. It is located on the east bank of the Kuk River, 15 miles (24 km) upriver from Wainwright. The site includes a major outcropping of coal deposits, a camp site that has seen use since the 19th century by Natives mining coal, and a nearby reindeer herding camp site also associated with the coal deposits. Coal became an important source of fuel to the native population after the introduction of iron stoves, and this site was historically significant as it was midway between the coast and inland hunting areas. Although most residences in Wainright are now heated with oil, its residents still use this site to supplement that usage.

The site was listed on the National Register of Historic Places in 1980.

== See also ==
- National Register of Historic Places listings in North Slope Borough, Alaska
