= Atanik =

Archaeological site in Alaska, United States

- U.S. National Register of Historic Places
- Alaska Heritage Resources Survey
- Location: Address restricted
- Nearest city: Wainwright, Alaska
- NRHP reference No.: 80004557
- AHRS No.: WAI-009

Significant dates
- Added to NRHP: March 18, 1980
- Designated AHRS: [date]

Atanik is a prehistoric and historic Native Alaskan community site on coast of the Chukchi Sea in North Slope Borough, Alaska. A Native village was documented to be at the site in 1838, and the area may have evidence of much earlier habitation. Archaeological features of interest include the ruins of sod houses, ice cellars, a cemetery, and evidence of whaling-related activity. The site is also believed to have been a point from which inland hunting expeditions were launched.

The site was listed on the National Register of Historic Places in 1980.

== See also ==
- National Register of Historic Places listings in North Slope Borough, Alaska
