= Grinage =

Grinage is a surname. Notable people with the surname include:

- Beverly Patkotak Grinage, American academic administrator and community organizer
- Raphael Grinage (1931–1993, birth name Les Grinage), American jazz and folk musician and composer
