= Utkeagvik Church Manse =

- U.S. National Register of Historic Places
- Alaska Heritage Resources Survey
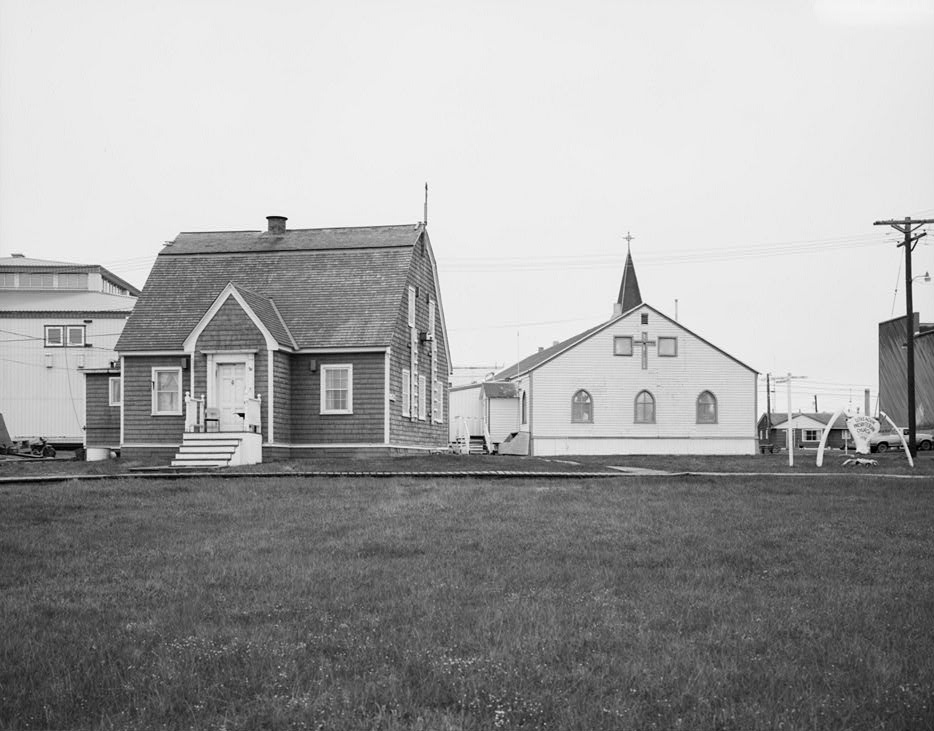

- Location within Alaska
- Location: 1268 Church Street, Utqiaġvik, Alaska
- Coordinates: 71.29278°N 156.78326°W
- Area: less than one acre
- Built: 1930
- Built by: US Presbyterian Board of Missions; Dr. Henry Greist
- Architectural style: Dutch Colonial
- NRHP reference No.: 83003447
- AHRS No.: BAR-004

Significant dates
- Added to NRHP: October 6, 1983
- Designated AHRS: June 30, 1974

The Utkeagvik Church Manse, also known as the Utkeagvik Presbyterian Church Manse and The Pastor's House, is a historic church parsonage at 1268 Church Street in Utqiaġvik, Alaska. It is a two-story wood frame gambrel-roofed Dutch Colonial, and is distinctive as the only building of this style in Utqiaġvik. Built in 1930, it was also the first two-story building in the community, and the first to be built from a kit, a building method later widely adopted in Arctic Alaska. The kit was configured in Seattle, Washington, shipped by freighter to Utqiaġvik, and assembled by local Native Alaskan workers under the supervision of Dr. Henry Greist. Its construction was funded by the U.S. Presbyterian Board of Missions. Dr. Greist was for many years a pillar of the local community, who operated an outpatient medical clinic from this building. Geist was a medical doctor and Presbyterian minister who served the people of Utqiaġvik and the surrounding areas from 1921 to 1936. The name Utkeagvik is spelled Utqiaġvik in Iñupiaq, meaning "place to harvest edible roots".

The manse was added to the National Register of Historic Places in 1983.

== See also ==
- National Register of Historic Places listings in North Slope Borough, Alaska
