= Slope Mountain (North Slope Borough, Alaska) =

Mountain in Alaska, United States

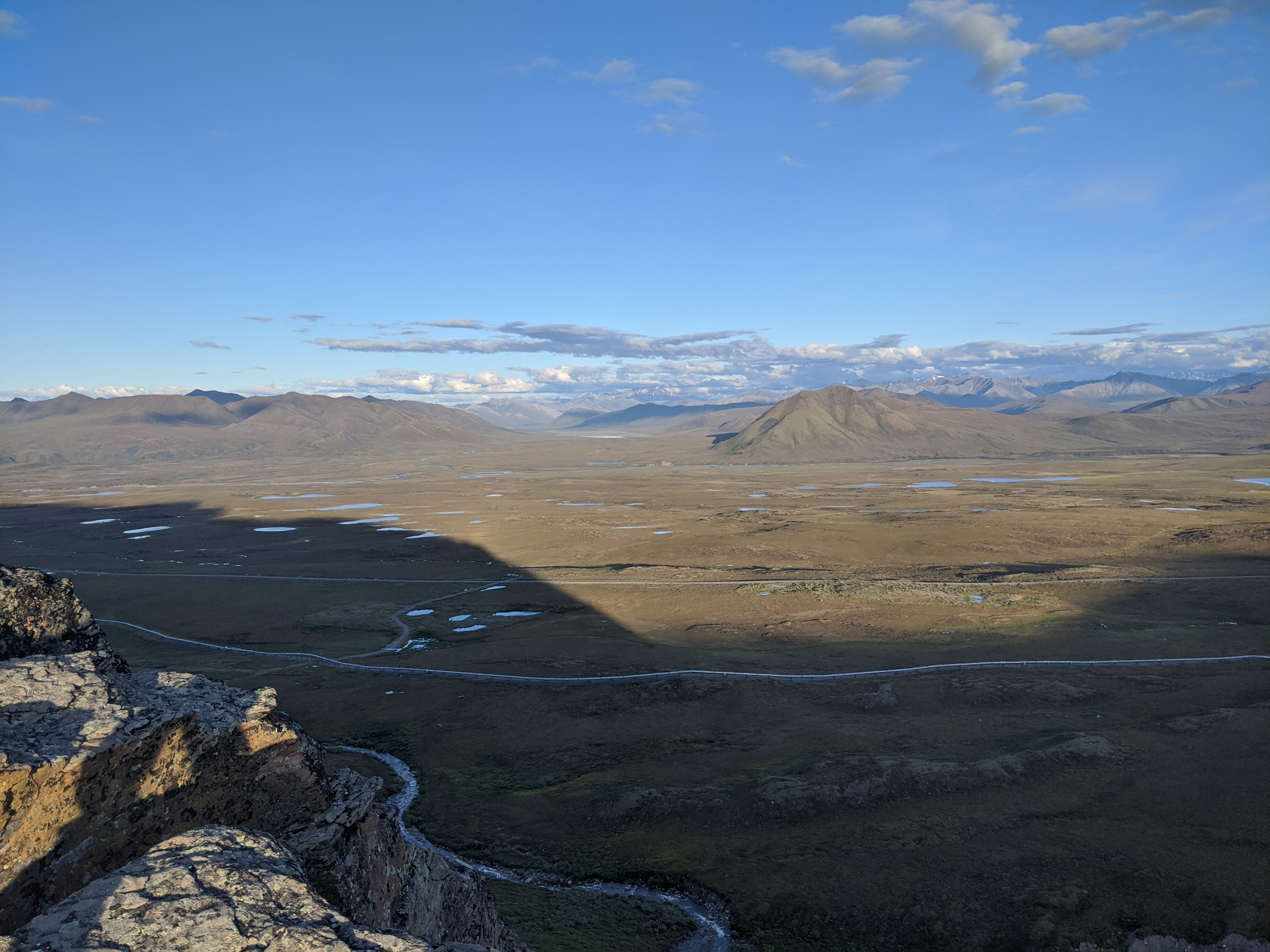
- View east from the top of Slope Mountain, 2020. Seen below is the Dalton Highway and Trans-Alaska Pipeline.

Highest point
- Elevation: 3,957 ft (1,206 m)
- Coordinates: 68°44′32″N 149°04′05″W

Geography
- Location within Alaska
- Country: United States
- State: Alaska
- Borough: North Slope Borough

Slope Mountain is a mountain in the North Slope Borough, Alaska located 13 km (8.1 mi) southwest of the confluence of the Ribdon River and the Sagavanirktok River, 14 km (8 mi) east of Imnavait Mountain.

It is located at mile post 300 on the Dalton Highway, and falls on the northern boundary of Bureau of Land Management managed land.
