= Pearl Brower =

American academic administrator

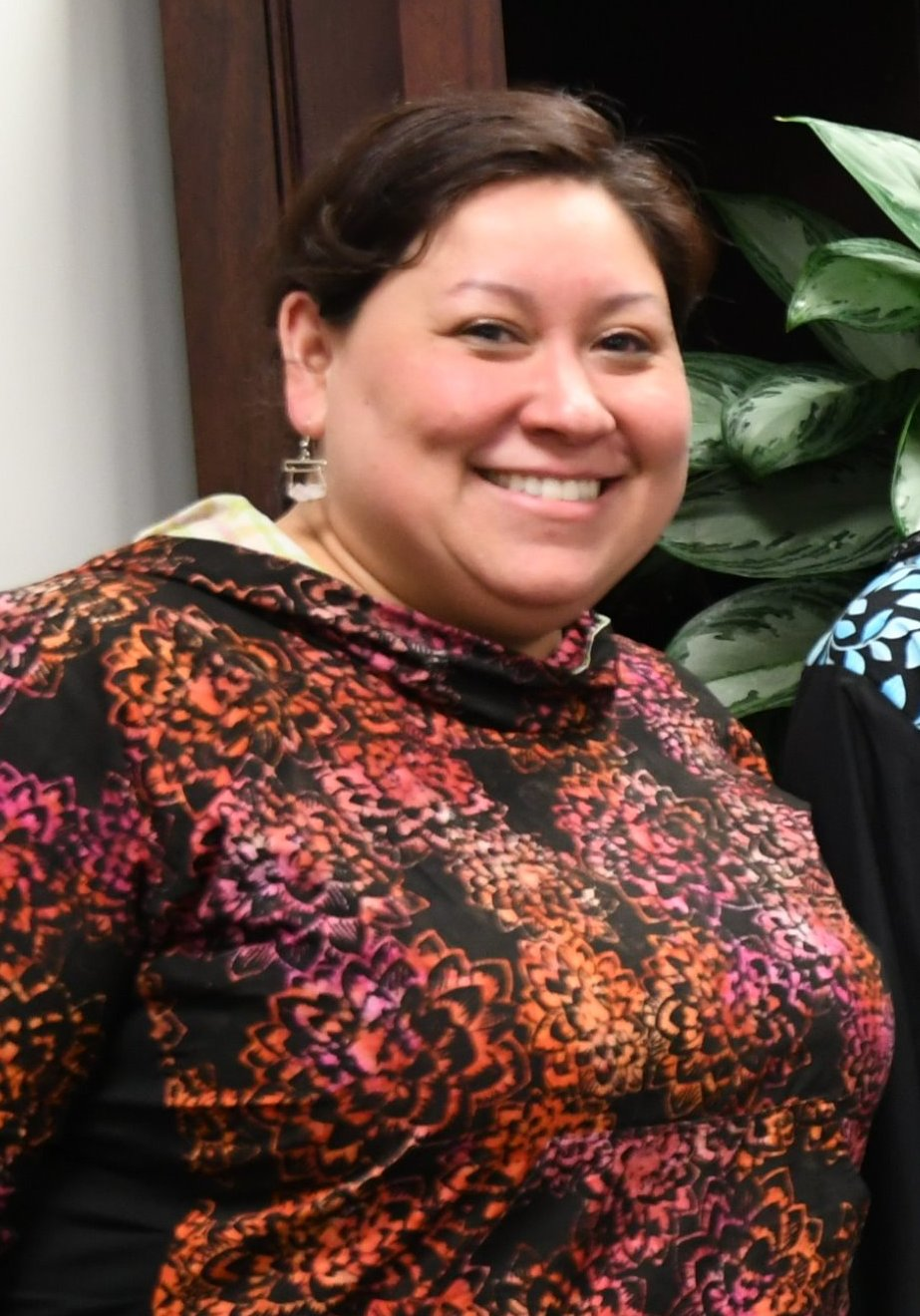

President of Iḷisaġvik College
- In office 2012 – September 30, 2020
- Preceded by: Brooke Gondara
- Succeeded by: Justina Wilhelm

Personal details
- Born: Pearl Kiyawn Nageak Brower Barrow, Alaska
- Spouse: Donald Jesse Darling Jr.
- Children: 2
- Education: Shasta College; University of Alaska Fairbanks
- Occupation: Academic administrator

Pearl Kiyawn Nageak Brower (Inupiat, Middle names pronounced Qaiyaan Naġiaq in Iñupiaq) is an American academic administrator. She was president of Iḷisaġvik College from 2012-2020.

== Early life and education ==
Brower was born in Barrow, Alaska and raised in Utqiagvik, Alaska and in Northern California by a family of Iñupiat, Armenian, and Chippewa descent. Her Iñupiat grandmother served as an elected member of the North Slope Borough School Board and was an education advocate. Her maternal grandfather was a culture bearer who lived in the Alaska North Slope.

Brower graduated from Shasta College. She completed two B.A. degrees in Alaska Native Studies and Anthropology in 2004. She completed a master's degree in Alaska Native and Rural Development in 2010 at University of Alaska Fairbanks (UAF). She completed a Ph.D. in 2016 in indigenous studies, with an emphasis in indigenous leadership from UAF.

== Career ==
Brower managed a culture and education grant for North Slope Borough and was a museum curator at the Iñupiat Heritage Center. She joined Iḷisaġvik College in 2007, where she worked in institutional advancement, student services, and marketing. She served as the director of external relations and development at Iḷisaġvik; she was selected as president of the college in 2012, after having served three months as the interim. In 2015, Brower was named by Alaska Journal of Commerce as one of Alaska's top 40 under 40.

== Personal life ==
Brower is married to Donald Jesse Darling Jr. They have two daughters.

== See also ==
- List of women presidents or chancellors of co-ed colleges and universities

Academic offices
Preceded by Brooke Gondara	President of the Iḷisaġvik College; 2012 – 2020	Succeeded by Justina Wilhelm
