= Patkotak =

Patkotak is a Native American surname. Notable people with the surname include:

- Beverly Patkotak Grinage (fl. 1988–2010), American academic administrator and community organizer
- Josiah Patkotak (born 1994), American politician
