= Edna Ahgeak MacLean =

Iñupiaq academic administrator, linguist, anthropologist and educator

- Paniattaaq

President of Iḷisaġvik College
- In office 1995–2005
- Preceded by: Benjamin Nageak
- Succeeded by: Beverly Patkotak Grinage

Personal details
- Born: Edna Ahgeak; November 5, 1944 (age 81) Utqiaġvik, Alaska, U.S.
- Spouse: Stephen MacLean
- Children: 2
- Education: Colorado Women's College (B.A.); University of Washington (M.A.); Stanford University (Ph.D.)
- Occupation: Academic administrator, linguist, anthropologist, educator

Edna Ahgeak MacLean also known by her Iñupiaq name Paniattaaq (born November 5, 1944) is an Iñupiaq academic administrator, linguist, anthropologist and educator from Alaska, who has specialized in the preservation and revitalization of the Iñupiaq language.

== Early life and education ==
Edna Ahgeak was born in Utqiaġvik, Alaska (known in English as Barrow prior to 2016). Her mother was Maria Brower Ahgeak and her father was Joseph A. Ahgeak, who was a hunter. She grew up bilingual in Iñupiaq and English. Growing up in Barrow, she attended Barrow Day School, where she said a third grade teacher would "physically throw children across the room" for speaking their Iñupiaq language.

Later, she attended Wrangell Institute and Mount Edgecumbe High School, both boarding schools administered at the time by the Bureau of Indian Affairs. In 1965, she attended Colorado Women's College in Denver, Colorado, on a scholarship, earning a B.A. in history. She received a teaching certificate from the University of California at Berkeley in 1969. In 1991, she earned a M.A. in Bilingual Education from the University of Washington. In 1995, she received a Ph.D. in education from Stanford University.

== Career ==
Beginning in 1963, she worked for the University of Alaska Fairbanks, teaching Iñupiaq and developing their first degree programs in Eskimo languages. She became tenured and was an associate professor at UAF until 1987. Throughout the 1970s and 1980s, she wrote, edited and published dozens of Iñupiaq language materials, including an abridged Iñupiaq dictionary in 1981 and an Iñupiaq grammar in 1986.

She worked for the State of Alaska Department of Education as a Special Assistant for Rural and Alaska Native Education to the Commissioner of Education from 1987 to 1990. In 1995, MacLean became president of Iḷisaġvik College, leading Alaska's only nationally certified tribal college. She was succeeded by Beverly Patkotak Grinage in 2005. In the 2000s, she spent two years working on a Rosetta Stone software program in the North Slope dialect of Iñupiaq.

After 30 years of work on the project, she finished the exhaustive Iñupiaq–English dictionary in 2014. She retired in 2014 and continues to contribute to Iñupiaq language projects in Alaska, serving on the North Slope Borough's Iñupiaq History, Language, and Culture Commission.

== Awards and recognition ==
MacLean received the Citizen of the Year Award from the Alaska Federation of Natives in 2005. In 2006, she won the Distinguished Service to the Humanities Award from the Governor of Alaska. In 2018, she was inducted into the Alaska Women's Hall of Fame.

== Personal life ==
She is married to ecologist Stephen MacLean. She has two sons, Stephen Ahgeak MacLean, a conservationist, and Andrew Okpeaha MacLean, a filmmaker, who wrote and directed the 2011 drama On the Ice. She assisted her son in translating the Iñupiaq lines for the movie. She lives in Anchorage, Alaska.
