= Iḷisaġvik College =

Public tribal community college in Utqiaġvik, Alaska

Coordinates: 71°19′30″N 156°40′50″W

- Motto: Honoring your past, preparing for your future
- Type: Public tribal land-grant community college
- Established: 1996; 30 years ago
- Parent institution: North Slope Borough
- Academic affiliations: UArctic; AIHEC
- President: Justina Wilhelm
- Location: Utqiaġvik, Alaska, United States
- Campus: Rural
- Website: ilisagvik.edu

Iḷisaġvik College (Inupiaq: [iʎisɑʁvik]) is a public tribal land-grant community college in Utqiaġvik (formerly Barrow), Alaska. The college is an active member of the University of the Arctic (UArctic), an international cooperative network of post-secondary institutions promoting education and research in the Circumpolar North. It is a member of the American Indian Higher Education Consortium. The college offers a bachelor's degree in business administration, associate degrees, one-year certificates, and adult education courses for GED preparation. In 2020, the college's Alaska Dental Therapy Educational Program became the first program in the United States to be fully accredited by the Commission on Dental Accreditation.

== History ==
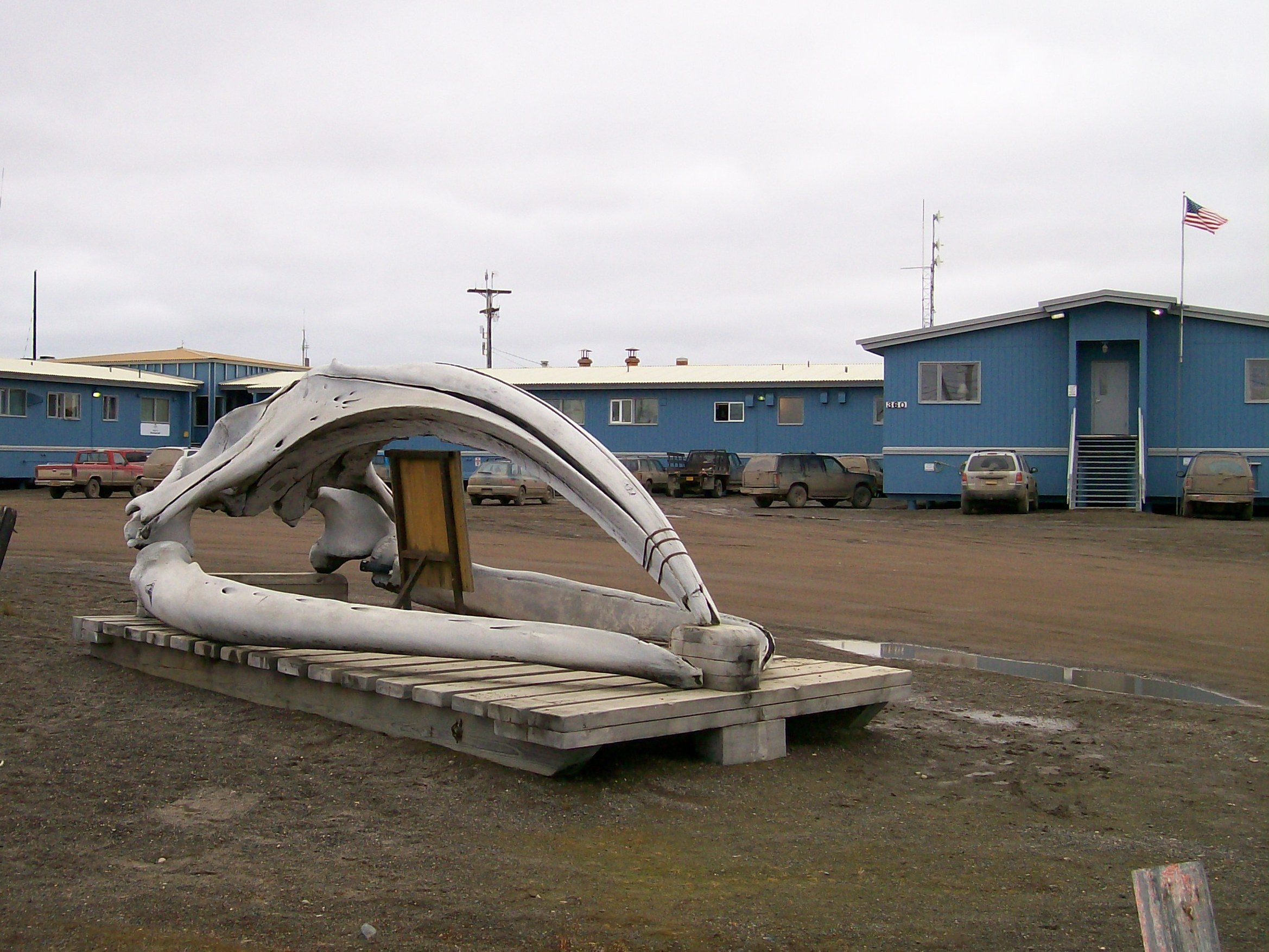
Bowhead whale skull in front of Iḷisaġvik College main building

Iḷisaġvik College (IC) was renamed in 2005. It had been developed in alliance with the University of Alaska Fairbanks, beginning in 1986. Like other tribal colleges, it is a result of the Native American and Alaskan Native self-determination movement that expanded in late 1960s and early 1970s. The North Slope Borough was organized as a home rule government in 1972, and with that, the Iñupiat people took other steps toward regaining control of their culture.

The college was created to satisfy higher education needs of Alaskan Natives and American Indians. IC generally serves geographically isolated populations that have no other means accessing higher education. Beginning in 1986, the North Slope Borough had worked with the University of Alaska Fairbanks to create the North Slope Higher Education Center.

In 1995 the Borough passed an ordinance incorporating Iḷisaġvik College as a public and independent non-profit corporation. The school moved to the facility previously used by the United States Naval Arctic Research Laboratory (NARL). In 1996, IC took over the Iñupiat Heritage Center. In 1997 the school changed its name to Arctic Sivunmun Iḷisaġvik College. It was led from 1995 to 2005 by college president, Edna Ahgeak MacLean (Iñupiat) an educator from Utqiaġvik (Barrow). Iḷisaġvik College was a leader in 1997 in founding the Consortium for Alaska Native Higher Education (CANHE).

In 2005, the North Slope Borough established IC, the first, and still the only, tribal college in the state of Alaska. It was federally recognized in 2007 as the 36th tribal college in the United States and designated a land-grant college the following year.

=== Presidents ===
IC has been led primarily by indigenous educators, who have mostly been local Iñupiat people. Brooke Gondara is Northern Cheyenne, and Justina Wilhelm is half Italian, half Filipino.

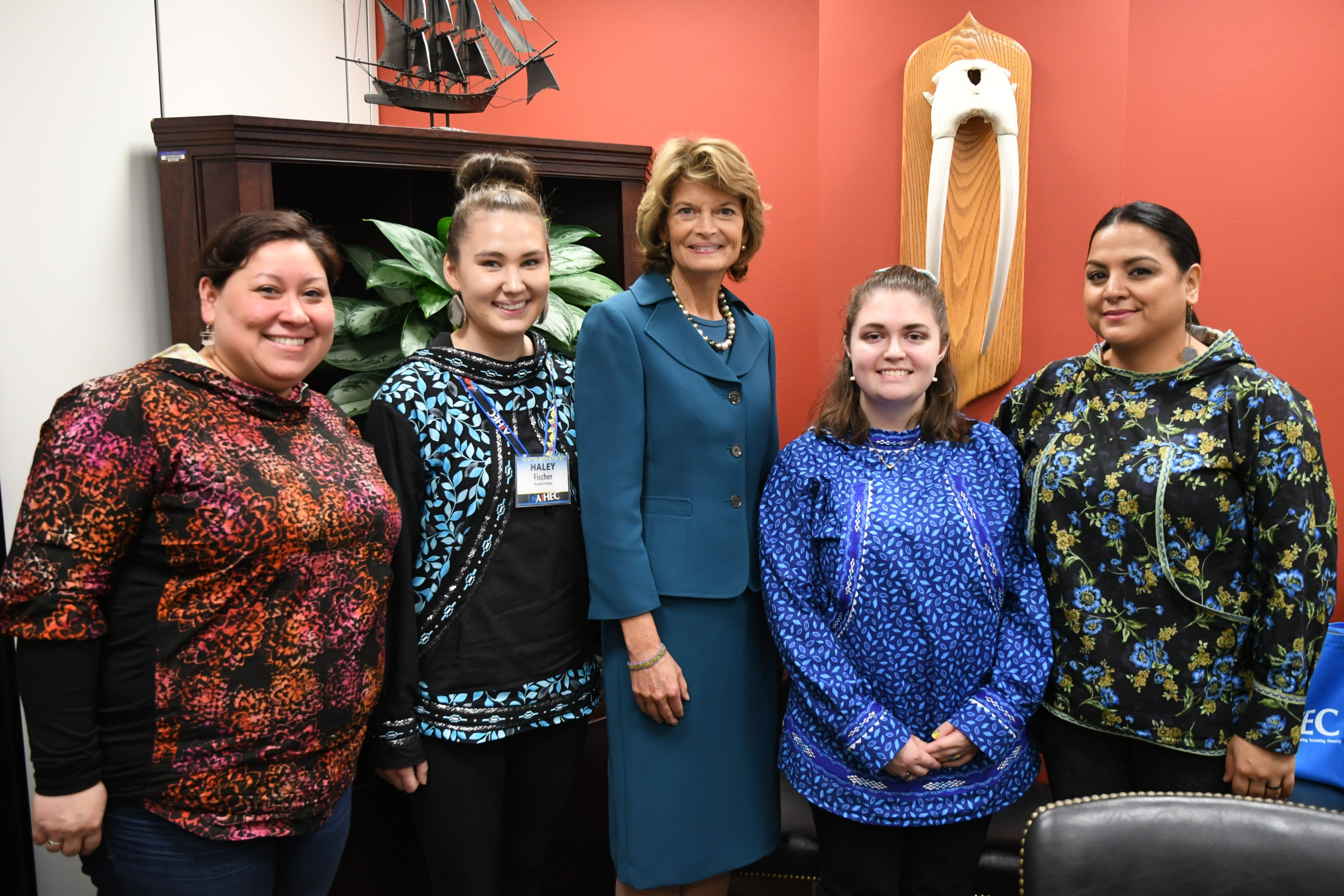
US Senator Lisa Murkowski (R-AK) with students and faculty from Iḷisaġvik College

S. No.	Name	Term
1.	Benjamin Nageak (executive vice president)	
2.	Edna Ahgeak MacLean	1995–2005
3.	Beverly Patkotak Grinage	2005–2010
4.	Brooke Gondara	2010–2011
5.	Pearl Kiyawn Nageak Brower	2012–2020
6.	Justina Wilhelm	2020–present

== Academics ==
Undergraduate demographics as of Fall 2023
Race and ethnicity	Total
American Indian/Alaska Native	70%
Native Hawaiian/Pacific Islander	10%
Asian	9%
White	8%
Black	1%
Hispanic	1%
Two or more races	1%
Unknown	1%

Accredited in 2003 by the Northwest Commission on Colleges and Universities, the college offers a bachelor's degree in business administration, associate's degrees, one-year certificates, and adult education courses for GED preparation. Academic programs at IC reflect local Iñupiat traditions, values, and culture. They are also intended to provide training for career and employment opportunities.

In 2018, then-President Brower discussed the hope of expanding a current program into the school's second bachelor's degree program in elementary education with an indigenous focus. In 2020, the college's Alaska Dental Therapy Educational Program became the first program in the United States to be fully accredited by the Commission on Dental Accreditation. The program opened in 2004 and, by 2017, had increased oral healthcare services via Tribal Health Services by 40,000 people, mainly in rural populations across the state.

=== Partnerships ===
IC is a member of the American Indian Higher Education Consortium (AIHEC), a community of tribally and federally chartered institutions that work to strengthen and lead tribal communities in higher education.

The university is an active member of the University of the Arctic. UArctic is an international cooperative network based in the Circumpolar Arctic region, consisting of more than 200 universities, colleges, and other organizations with an interest in promoting education and research in the Arctic region.

== Governance ==
Iḷisaġvik College is governed by a board of trustees representing communities across the North Slope Borough. Established in 1995 by municipal ordinance as an independent non-profit entity, it is sanctioned by the Inupiat Community of the Arctic Slope (ICAS) tribal government as Alaska's only federally recognized tribal college.The college is accredited by the Northwest Commission on Colleges and Universities (NWCCU).

The institution's curriculum integrates traditional Iñupiaq values, culture, and language into post-secondary academic, vocational, and technical programs.

== Campus ==
Location of Iḷisaġvik College.

The Tuzzy Consortium Library is named after Evelyn Tuzroyluk Higbee, a member of the original Board of Higher Education for the college.

The campus is located in the former complex of the Naval Arctic Research Laboratory.

== See also ==
- Point Barrow
