= Negilik Site =

Archaeological site in Alaska, United States

- U.S. National Register of Historic Places
- Alaska Heritage Resources Survey
- Location: Address restricted
- Nearest city: Nuiqsut, Alaska
- Area: 218.5 acres (88.4 ha)
- NRHP reference No.: 80004562
- AHRS No.: HAR-169

Significant dates
- Added to NRHP: April 15, 1980
- Designated AHRS: [date]

The Negilik Site, also known as Woods' Camp, is a historic and prehistoric site on the banks of the Colville River of Arctic Alaska, United States. The lowest levels of the site include evidence of prehistoric occupation that has by traditional accounts been associated with trading activities, and includes the remains of a sod house. The area was in 1949 occupied by the Alaska Native Woods family, who built a frame house and dug an ice cellar for use as a seasonal fishing outpost.

The site was listed on the National Register of Historic Places in 1980.

== See also ==
- National Register of Historic Places listings in North Slope Borough, Alaska
