= The blob (Chukchi Sea algae) =

Large algal bloom first spotted floating in the Chukchi Sea

The blob was the name given to a large black algal bloom that was first spotted floating in the Chukchi Sea between the Alaskan cities of Wainwright and Utqiaġvik in July 2009.

== Discovery and location ==
The mass was initially discovered by a civilian boat from Wainwright and reported to the U.S. Coast Guard due to concerns that it could have been an oil spill. Samples taken by the North Slope Borough government and analyzed in a lab in Anchorage identified it as a type of marine alga.

The Chukchi Sea, where the mass was found, is a shallow part of the Arctic Ocean between western Alaska and the northeastern coasts of Russia. Algal blooms are common in shallow waters where light can penetrate to the seabed. However, locals reported that there was no recollection in any communities in the area of any sort of mass like it.

== Appearance ==
One strand of the mass was estimated to be 12 to 15 miles (19 to 24 km) long. It was frequently described by those who saw it as 'hairy' or 'stringy', with scientific analysis explaining it as a type of filamentous alga. It was also reported to have a distinct odor.

Though toxicity tests on the organism have yet to be conducted, concern is minimal as the area is not a host to commercial seafood production, though locals do fish and hunt there. The algae's black color is unusual for marine algae, which are typically shades of green or red. Several hypotheses have been put forth about the cause of this color. Terry Whitledge, director of the Institute of Marine Science at the University of Alaska Fairbanks, postulated that it could be due to the algae having undergone some level of decomposition.
