= Leffingwell Camp Site =

- U.S. National Register of Historic Places
- U.S. National Historic Landmark
- Alaska Heritage Resources Survey
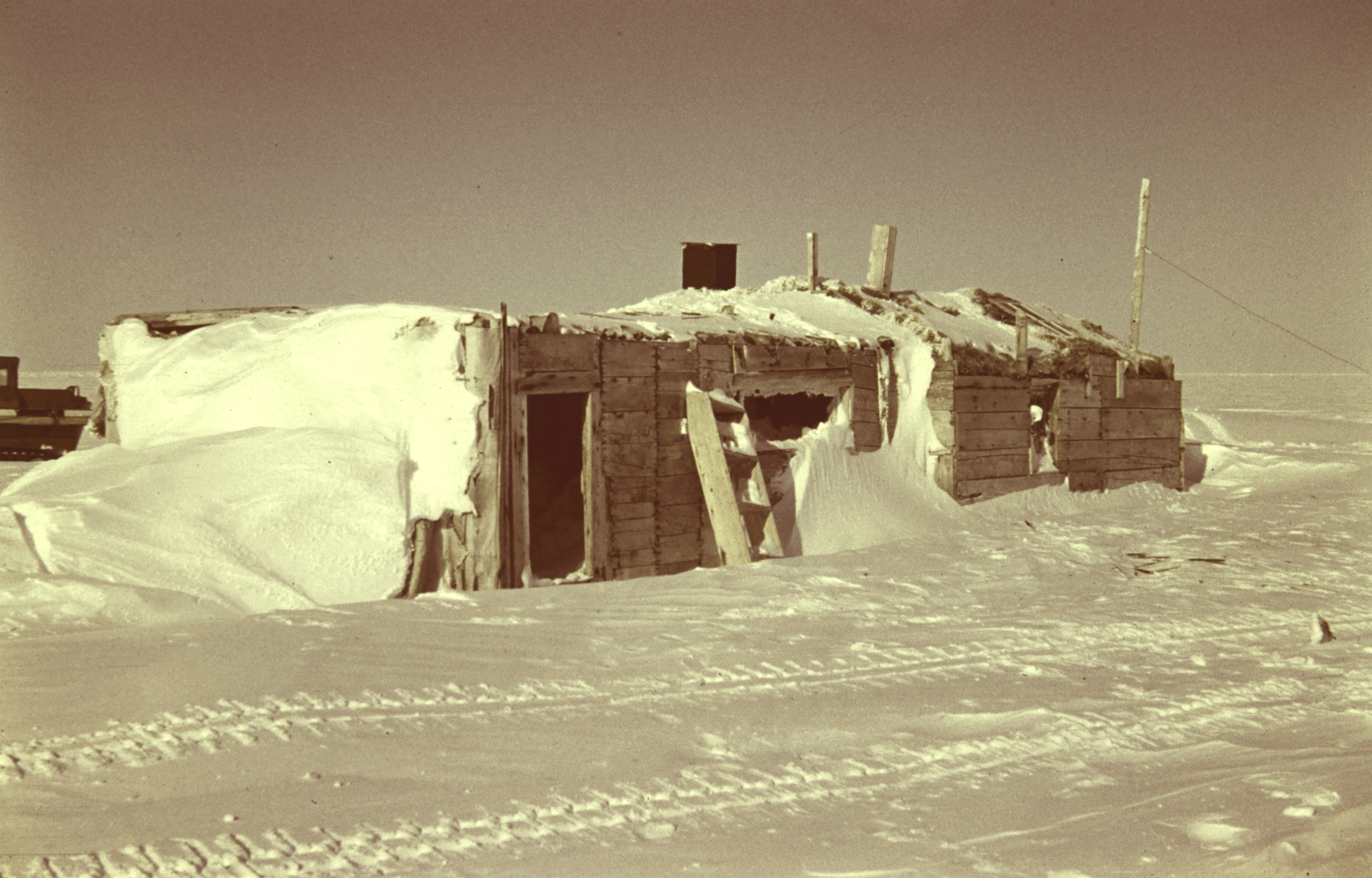
- Sod house at the Leffingwell Camp Site (1949)

- Location within Alaska
- Location: On Flaxman Island, about 58 miles (93 km) west of Kaktovik
- Coordinates: 70°11′07″N 146°03′10″W
- Area: 10 acres (4.0 ha)
- Built: 1906
- Built by: Anglo-American Polar Expedition
- NRHP reference No.: 71001093
- AHRS No.: XFI-002

Significant dates
- Added to NRHP: June 21, 1971
- Designated NHL: June 2, 1978
- Designated AHRS: January 15, 1971

The Leffingwell Camp Site, on Flaxman Island, 58 miles (93 km) west of Barter Island on the Arctic Coast of Alaska, was used by polar explorer and geologist Ernest de Koven Leffingwell on his pioneering Anglo-American Polar Expedition of 1906–1908, which aimed to explore the Beaufort Sea. The expedition's ship, the Duchess of Bedford, was allowed to become locked in ice which eventually destroyed it.

The camp site was chosen before the ship was locked in ice, and was not merely the nearest landfall. The site was used by Leffingwell over several years, beyond the end of that expedition.

Leffingwell created the first accurate map of a section of Alaskan coastline. He was the first to scientifically describe permafrost and to pose theories about permafrost which have largely proven true. He accurately identified the oil potential of the area, including assessing that it was not, in his day, technologically or economically feasible to develop it.

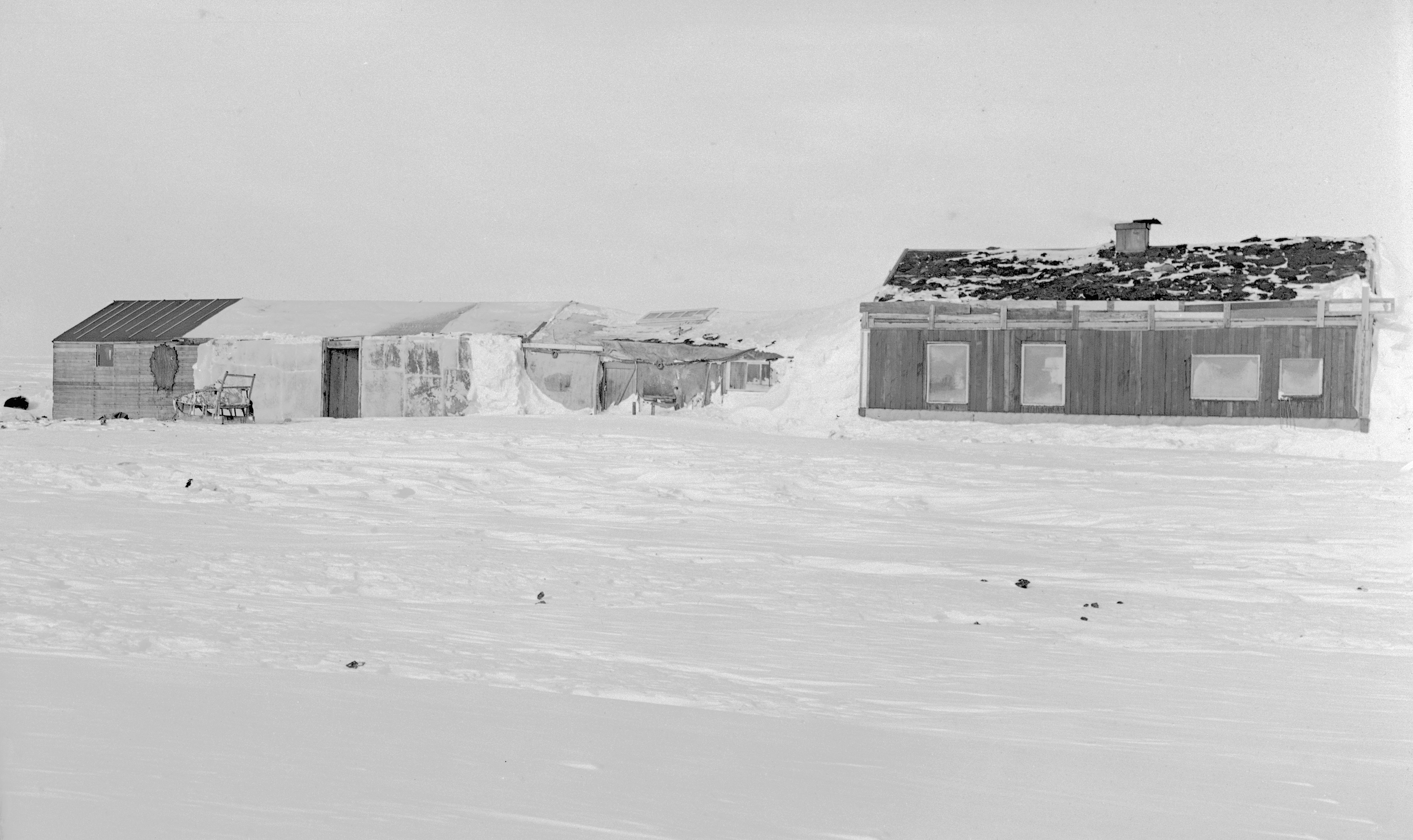
Leffingwell's camp, circa 1910, during the years that he still made use of it

Following the destruction of the Duchess of Bedford, Leffingwell "returned to civilization in the fall of 1908, as the guest of Capt. George B. Leavitt." Leffingwell subsequently named Narwhal Island for the name of Capt. Leavitt's vessel, the steam New Bedford, Massachusetts-based whaler Narwhal, and bestowed the name of the Maine-born Captain, who married an Inuk woman and settled at Barrow, on Leavitt Island off the Alaska North Slope.

The historic integrity of the camp was diminished in the 1930s when some structure was removed by a salvager.

The camp was added to the National Register of Historic Places in 1971 and was declared a National Historic Landmark in 1978.

== See also ==
- List of National Historic Landmarks in Alaska
- National Register of Historic Places listings in North Slope Borough, Alaska
