= Brooke Gondara =

American academic administrator and activist

President of Iḷisaġvik College
- In office 2010–2011
- Preceded by: Beverly Patkotak Grinage
- Succeeded by: Pearl Kiyawn Nageak Brower

Personal details
- Born: Brookney Beaverheart Claire Boston
- Spouse: Robbie Gondara
- Children: 2
- Education: Montana State University Billings (B.A., M.Ed.); Oregon State University (Ed.D.)
- Occupation: Academic administrator, activist

Brookney Clair Beaverheart Gondara (Northern Cheyenne) is an American academic administrator, activist, and advocate for women and minorities in higher education. She is associate dean of professional studies and education at Santa Fe Community College. Gondara served as president of Iḷisaġvik College, the only tribal college in Alaska, from 2010 to 2011.

In 2005, she became the first Northern Cheyenne woman to earn a PhD, earning one in education at Oregon State University. She had served as the dean of student affairs at Chief Dull Knife College from 2000 to 2003.

== Early life, education and marriage ==
Brookney Beaverheart Claire Boston was born to Tana Streeter of Billings, Montana and Monte Boston of Anchorage, Alaska. She is enrolled in the Northern Cheyenne (Tsitsistas/Suhtai) tribe. She dropped out of high school before graduating; she later earned a GED in Montana in 1990.

She pursued higher education, earning a bachelor's degree (1995) in sociology and Native American studies at Montana State University Billings, where she was supported financially by her tribe. She also earned a master of education (1996) in curriculum and instruction at the same university. Boston married Robbie Gondara in January 1997 in Billings, Montana.

== Career ==
After completing her master's, she taught sociology and worked as a museum education director at the Western Heritage Center, a regional museum in Billings.

From 2000 to 2003, she served as an dean of student affairs at Chief Dull Knife College on the Northern Cheyenne Reservation. She was the only female Native American administrator at the time. She was suspended in 2003 for what the college said were incidents of allegedly unprofessional behavior; she filed grievances over this action. Some students conducted a walkout and community protest in support of her.

In 2005, Gondara became the first woman from the Northern Cheyenne to earn a doctoral degree, completing a PhD in education, with an emphasis in community college leadership, at Oregon State University in Portland. Her doctoral studies focused on the experiences of Northern Cheyenne women in education.

Her dissertation was titled Testimonio: Ne`aahtove—Listen to me! Voices from the edge. Educational stories of Northern Cheyenne women. Gondara's doctoral advisor was Betty Duvall. Gondara has also completed post-doctoral studies in college presidential leadership at Harvard University.

== Career ==
Gondara became dean of the social sciences division at the Portland Community College (PCC) Sylvania Campus c. 2004. At PCC, she worked in program implementation and development and student advisement. In 2010 Gondara was selected as president of Iḷisaġvik College in Alaska. In 2011, she was succeeded by Pearl Kiyawn Nageak Brower. Gondara moved to New Mexico after being selected as an associate dean of trades, advanced technologies and sustainability, business, and professional studies and education at Santa Fe Community College.

=== Activism ===
In April 1997, Gondara wrote an opinion piece, published in The Billings Gazette, that opposed parental notification in cases of abortion, calling it "punitive control of our young women's sexual activity." Supportive of LGBT rights, she participated in a 2005 counter protest against the Westboro Baptist Church at Southridge High School over a production of the play The Laramie Project.

== Awards and honors ==
In 2006, the Montana State University at Billings Alumni Association honored Gondara with an 'exceptional contribution award'.

== Personal life ==
She has three daughters. In 2005, Gondara was a resident of Beaverton, Oregon. She now lives in Santa Fe.

== See also ==
- List of women presidents or chancellors of co-ed colleges and universities

Academic offices
Preceded by Beverly Patkotak Grinage	President of the Iḷisaġvik College; 2010 – 2011	Succeeded by Pearl Kiyawn Nageak Brower
