= Edward Itta =

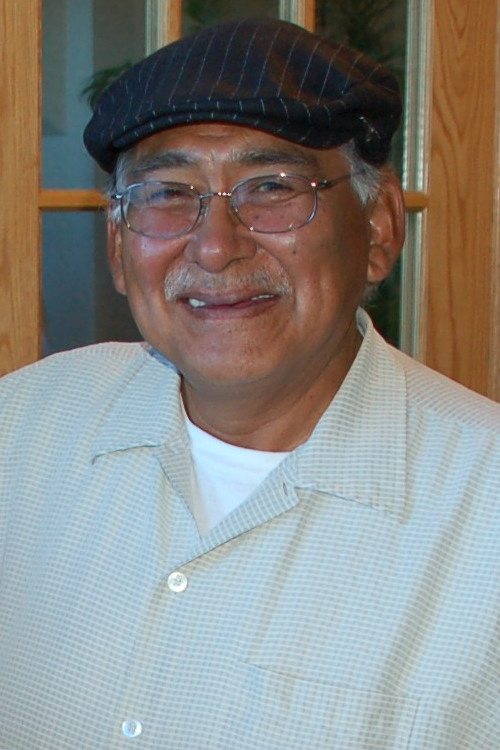

Member of the United States Arctic Research Commission
- In office 2012 – July 29, 2015
- Preceded by: Helvi Sandvik

Mayor of North Slope Borough, Alaska
- In office 2005 – November 15, 2011
- Preceded by: George Ahmaogak Sr.
- Succeeded by: Charlotte Brower

Personal details
- Born: Edward Saggan Itta; July 5, 1945 Utqiagvik, Alaska
- Died: November 6, 2016 (aged 71) Utqiagvik, Alaska
- Spouse: Elsie Hopson Itta
- Relatives: Brenda Itta (sister)

Edward Saggan Itta (July 5, 1945 – November 6, 2016) was an American Iñupiaq politician, activist and whaling captain. Itta served as the mayor of North Slope Borough, Alaska, the northernmost borough in the United States, for two consecutive terms from 2005 until 2011.

== Early life and education ==
Edward Saggan Itta was born in Utqiagvik (formerly named Barrow) in July 1945 to Noah and Mollie Itta. He grew up in a family living a traditional subsistence life of fishing and hunting for seals, walrus and whales, at camps on the tundra and sea ice.

He attended Mount Edgecumbe High School a boarding school in faraway Sitka and after graduating in 1964 trained as an electronics technician at a Cleveland school and in the U.S. Navy.

== Career ==
Itta´s first job was in Prudhoe Bay as an oil field roustabout.

In the 1980s, he was director of the North Slope Borough, Alaska's Public Works department, spearheading modernization of North Slope villages water and sewer services and other amenities.

From 2005 until 2011 he was Mayor of North Slope Borough, for two consecutive terms. In November 2008, he was re-elected to a second term with more than 53% of the vote. He crossed political lines to meet with all sides, but took on organizations he saw as overly supportive of industry like the Arctic Slope Regional Corporation.

On November 27, 2012, President Barack Obama appointed Itta to the seven-member United States Arctic Research Commission, a federal agency which functions as the government's Arctic policy and research commission. He served on the Commission until the expiration of his term on July 29, 2015.

Itta served as the President of the Inuit Circumpolar Council of Alaska, President of the Barrow Whaling Captains Association, vice chairman of the Alaska Eskimo Whaling Commission, and a representative for Alaska on the Outer Continental Shelf Policy Committee.

== Personal life and death ==
He was married to Elsie Hopson Itta, with whom he had two children. He died after battling cancer. As of 2023 he is survived by his older sister Brenda Itta (born November 13, 1943), an Iñupiaq activist and former legislator in the Alaska House of Representatives
