= Justina Wilhelm =

American academic administrator, social worker, and community leader

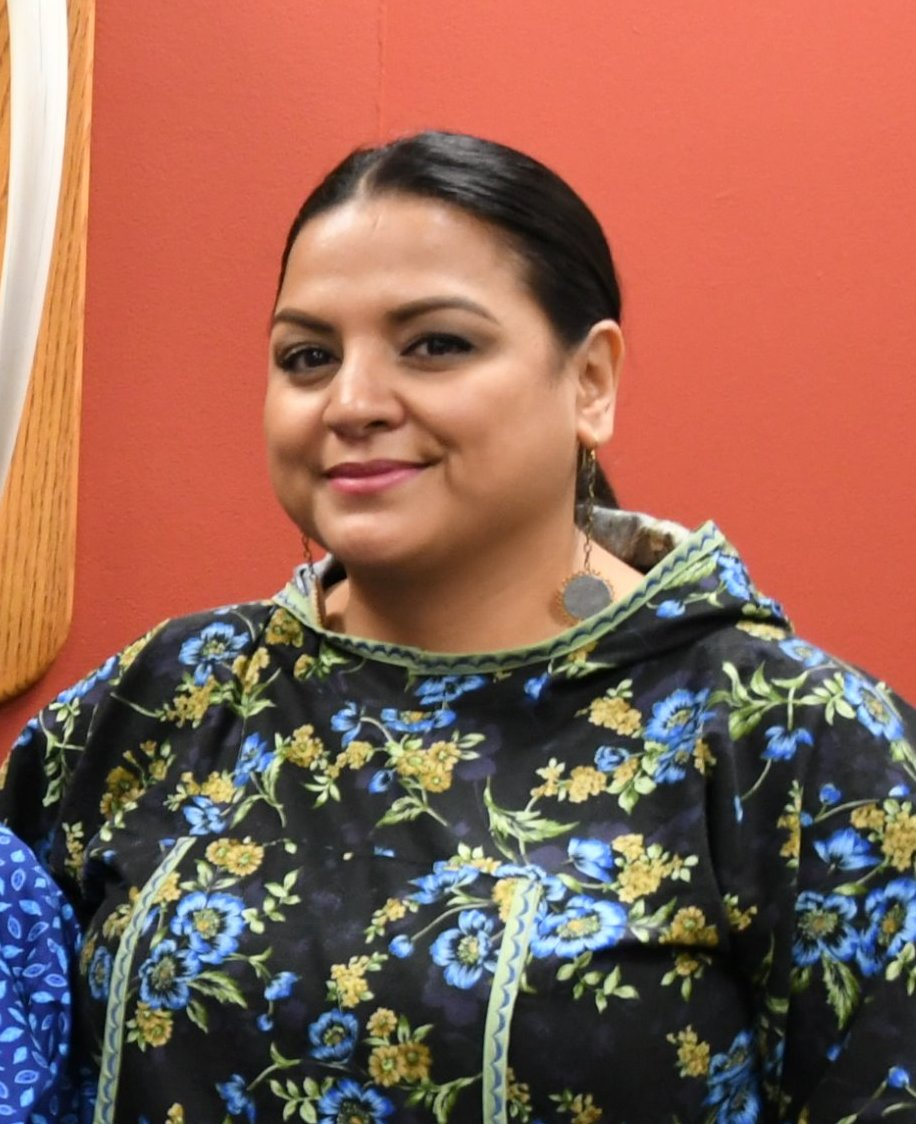
- Wilhelm in 2020

President of Iḷisaġvik College
- Incumbent
- Assumed office October 1, 2020
- Preceded by: Pearl Kiyawn Nageak Brower

Personal details
- Children: 4
- Education: University of Hawaiʻi at Hilo; University of New England
- Occupation: Academic administrator, social worker, community leader

Justina Wilhelm is an American academic administrator, community leader, and social worker who has served as president since 2020 of Iḷisaġvik College, located in Utqiaġvik, Alaska and the only tribal college in the state. She had previously served as a member of the North Slope Borough School District's advisor council and the Utqiaġvik City Council. Earlier she helped direct behavioral health at the jurisdiction's health department.

== Education ==
Wilhelm was born to Rosanna Lemen. Since the age of 8, she was raised by her mother in Utqiaġvik, Alaska (formerly Barrow). Wilhelm graduated from Barrow High School.

She earned a bachelor's degree in sociology from University of Hawaiʻi at Hilo. After returning for graduate studies, she earned a Master of Social Work from University of New England in 2018. Wilhelm is the first in her family to have graduated from college.

== Career ==
After college, Wilhelm returned to Utqiaġvik to work. She served 14 years as a social worker at the North Slope Health Department, and was deputy director of behavioral health for seven of those years.

In 2017, Wilhelm joined Iḷisaġvik College as executive director of institutional advancement. She was promoted to dean of institutional advancement and then vice president. In 2020, Wilhelm was named by the North Slope Borough as the next president of the institution, succeeding Pearl Kiyawn Nageak Brower. She became president on October 1, 2020.

Wihelm has also been an active community leader. She served on the North Slope Borough School District's advisor council, the North Slope Borough Personnel Hearing Board, Arctic Women in Crisis Board, Eben Hopson Memorial Scholarship Committee, and the Utqiaġvik City Council.

== Personal life ==
Wihelm is an imiun, and the wife of whaling captain Ross Makalik Wilhelm. They have four children together. Since 2007, she has served on his crew.

Academic offices
Preceded by Pearl Kiyawn Nageak Brower	President of the Iḷisaġvik College; 2020–present	Incumbent
