= Beverly Patkotak Grinage =

American academic administrator

President of Iḷisaġvik College
- In office 2005–2010
- Preceded by: Edna Ahgeak MacLean
- Succeeded by: Brooke Gondara

Personal details
- Born: Beverly Patkotak
- Spouse: Kent Grinage
- Children: 1
- Education: University of Alaska Fairbanks (M.A.)
- Occupation: Academic administrator, community organizer, public information specialist, campaign manager

Beverly Patkotak Grinage is an American academic administrator and community organizer. She was president of Iḷisaġvik College from 2005 to 2010. Grinage is a former executive director of the Alaska Eskimo Whaling Commission and she was a public information officer for the North Slope Borough School District. Grinage has worked as campaign manager and previously was the owner of a publishing business. She was the managing editor of the Tundra Times and a member of the Alaska State Council on the Arts.

== Career and education ==
Grinage was the managing editor of the Tundra Times. In 1988, she was serving as a public information officer for the North Slope Borough School District.

In 1989, Grinage worked as a public information specialist, owned a publishing business in Utqiagvik, Alaska, and was appointed by Alaska Governor Steve Cowper to the Alaska State Council on the Arts in 1989 where she continued through 1991. In 1990, she was the campaign manager for Edward Itta, a candidate for mayor of North Slope Borough. She was serving as the executive director of the Alaska Eskimo Whaling Commission in 1991. In 2004, Grinage was a community organizer in Barrow. She is a shareholder of the Arctic Slope Regional Corporation (ASRC) and was a critic of the ASRC management. She organized the group, Shareholders First, to collect signatures at a shareholder meeting due to diminishing dividends. She stated her aim was to help the corporation and the board of directors which will benefit all parties.

Grinage succeeded Edna Ahgeak MacLean as president of Iḷisaġvik College in 2005. She was succeeded by Brooke Gondara in 2010. Grinage completed a M.A. at University of Alaska Fairbanks in 2008. Her thesis was titled Inupiat self-determination through higher education.

== Personal life ==
Grinage is married to Kent Grinage. They have a daughter. She advocates for the use of the Inupiaq language among youth.

== See also ==
- List of women presidents or chancellors of co-ed colleges and universities

Academic offices
Preceded by Edna Ahgeak MacLean	President of the Iḷisaġvik College; 2005 – 2010	Succeeded by Brooke Gondara
