= Gallagher Flint Station Archeological Site =

Archaeological site in Alaska, United States

- U.S. National Register of Historic Places
- U.S. National Historic Landmark
- Alaska Heritage Resources Survey
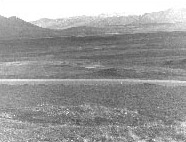
- Countryside at the site
- Location: Address restricted
- Nearest city: Sagwon, Alaska
- NRHP reference No.: 78003208
- AHRS No.: PSM-050

Significant dates
- Added to NRHP: June 16, 1978
- Designated NHL: June 2, 1978

The Gallagher Flint Station Archeological Site is an archaeological site and National Historic Landmark in northern Alaska. Discovered in 1970 during the construction of the Trans-Alaska Pipeline, it yielded a radiocarbon date of 10,540 B.P., making it the oldest site of human activity then known in the state at the time of its discovery.

== Description ==
The Gallagher Flint Station site is located in the foothills on the north side of the Brooks Range in far northern Alaska, near the Sagavanirktok River. There are three separate areas of archaeological interest within the site, two of which overlap slightly in their vertical stratigraphy. The isolated site, Locality 2, consists of two hearths with stone tools, including bifacial blades, and evidence of tool work. This site yielded a radiocarbon date of about 1,000 BCE.

The other two areas, Localities 1 and 1A, partially overlap. Locality 1A yielded a radiocarbon date of about 650 BCE, and tool finds there included fragments of a drill bit made of green chert. Locality 1 exhibits the characteristics of a tool workshop, and yielded a date of 10,540 before present, or about 8,500 BCE; the oldest previous dates recovered in the state were for c. 8,000 BCE. Older dates have since been obtained at the Dry Creek Archeological Site.

The most notable feature of the stone tools found at Locality 1 is the absence of bifacial tools. None of the three localities included any remains of animal-based tools (made with antler, bone, or other animal parts). The site has been interpreted as a quarry site, where the users worked on tools while observing the countryside for prey to hunt.

The site was declared a National Historic Landmark and listed on the National Register of Historic Places in 1978.

== See also ==
- List of National Historic Landmarks in Alaska
- National Register of Historic Places listings in North Slope Borough, Alaska
