= Thetis Mound =

Highest point
- Elevation: 3 ft (0.91 m)
- Coordinates: 70°28′21″N 149°43′40″W

Geography
- Location: North Slope Borough, Alaska, United States
- Topo map: USGS Beechey Point B-5

Thetis Mound is a hill in the North Slope Borough, of Alaska, United States. It is 4 miles (6 km) southeast of Oliktok Point and 13 miles (21 km) west of Beechey Point.

Thetis Mound is a type of hill known as a pingo.
