= Sagwon, Alaska =

Location in the North Slope of Alaska, United States

Sagwon
- Unincorporated community
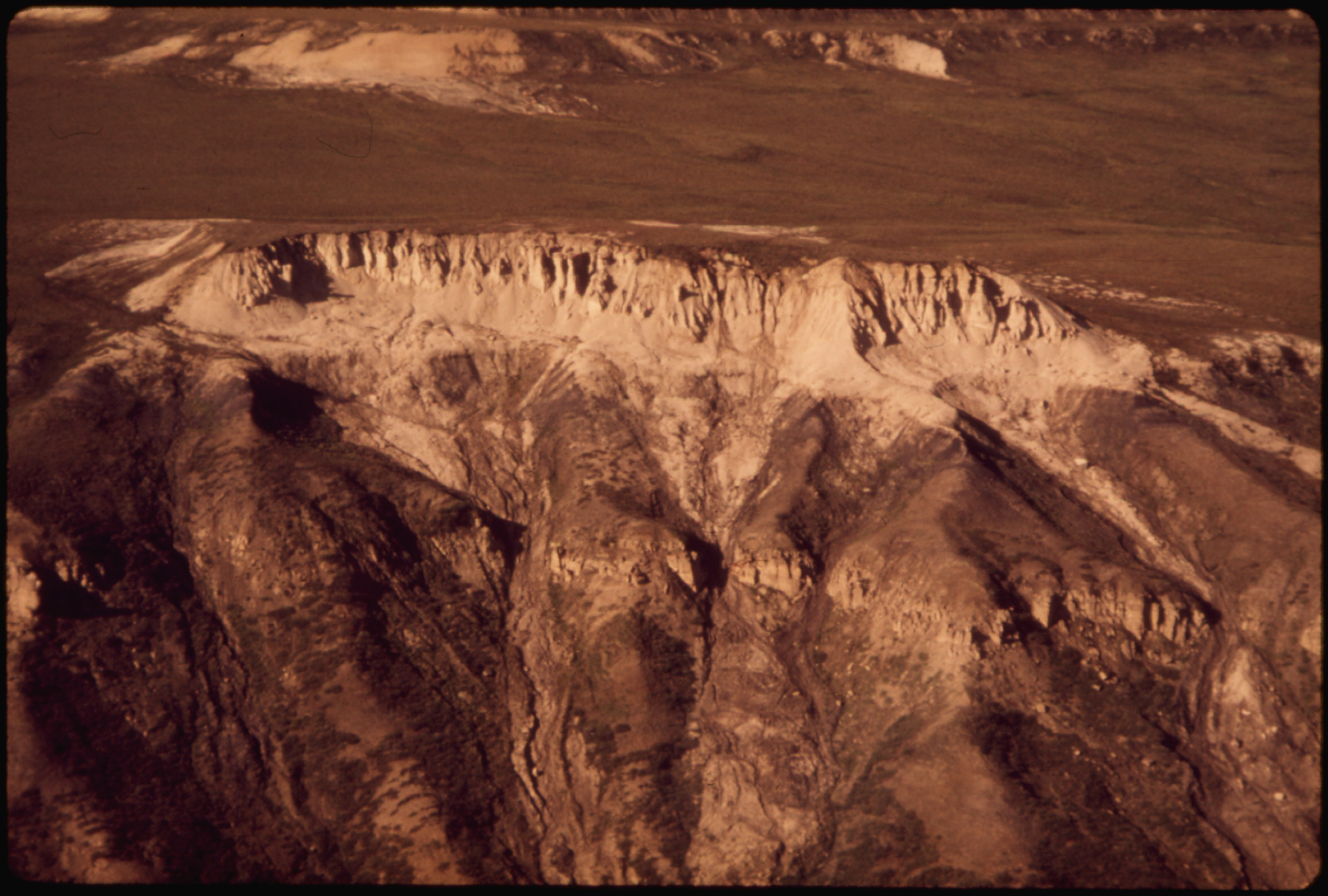
- Bluffs on the opposite side of Sagwon

- Location within the state of Alaska
- Coordinates: 69°22′0″N 148°42′0″W
- Country: United States
- State: Alaska
- Borough: North Slope

Government
  - Borough mayor: Harry K. Brower, Jr.
  - State senator: Donny Olson (D)
  - State rep.: Dean Westlake (D)
- Elevation: 675 ft (206 m)
- Time zone: UTC-9 (Alaska (AKST))
  - Summer (DST): UTC-8 (AKDT)
- Area code: 907

Sagwon (short for Sag No. 1, see below) is a location 65 miles south of Deadhorse in North Slope Borough, Alaska, United States named after a now-vanished airline operating base built there in the 1960s to support oil exploration and subsequent construction of the Trans Alaska Pipeline System. It is above the Arctic Circle. It is known for the Gallagher Flint Station Archeological Site which was discovered during the construction of the pipeline.

== History ==
Sagwon was an operating base created by Interior Airways in the early 1960s to support oil exploration that resulted in finding the Prudhoe Bay Oil Field. It also supported construction of the pipeline in the mid 1970s. A runway was dug out of the tundra, eventually extended to over 5,000 ft with a set of lights to allow night operation. Interior Airways built a mess hall, accommodation, maintenance and other support buildings including an aircraft control tower, all flown in.

The site is adjacent to the Sagavanirktok (or Sag) River and was originally designated Sag No. 1, or, for short, Sag One. Hence, Sagwon.

Sagwon also functioned as a local base camp. A 1969 article describes creating an oil drilling site 75 miles from Sagwon. Earthmoving equipment and Caterpillar tractors were flown to Sagwon on Lockheed L-100 Hercules aircraft (a civil version of the C-130 military transport aircraft), then the tractors dragged enough equipment to the drilling site to create its own landing strip, after which flights went direct to the drilling site. At the time there was virtually no environmental regulation governing such activity. In all, 140 Hercules loads were needed to establish that specific drilling site, though as indicated, not all went through Sagwon. At that time, all supplies were flown in, including diesel fuel.

External links has a link to a short film of an Interior Airways Hercules flight from Fairbanks to Sagwon. There is also a link to photos of Sagwon in 1972, prior to the pipeline boom.

By 1973, however, focus started to shift to the Happy Valley airstrip located 15–20 miles south. Sagwon was located on the wrong side of the Sag River from the Dalton Highway (then known as the North Slope Haul Road). In 1982, five years after the completion of the pipeline, Interior Airways, now named Alaska International Air, advertised the site for sale. In 1999, the control tower remained on top of an old office, windows broken.

There was a Superfund site at the airstrip which was remediated by among other treatments, removing 636 tons of contaminated material.
