= Brenda Itta =

American politician (born 1943)

Brenda Tiggausina Itta-Lee
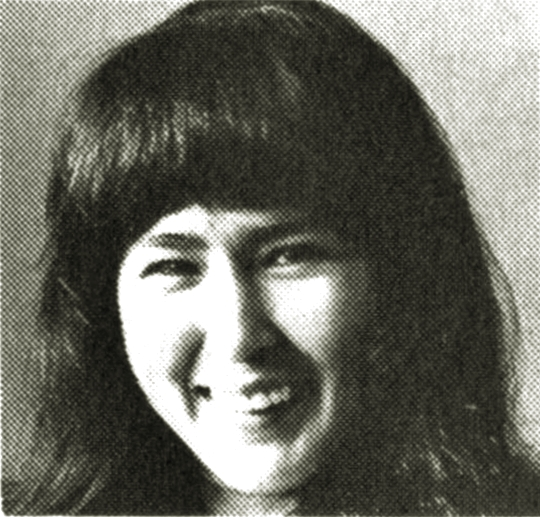
- Itta in 1975
- Born: November 13, 1943; Barrow (now Utqiaġvik), Alaska
- Died: September 25, 2025
- Education: Mt. Edgecumbe High School, Haskell Indian Junior College
- Occupation: former State Legislator
- Known for: First Alaska Native woman elected to the Alaska House of Representatives, Co-sponsor of the bill that created the Alaska Permanent Fund

Brenda Tiggausina Itta-Lee (November 13, 1943 - September 25, 2025) was an Iñupiaq activist and former legislator in Alaska's House of Representatives.

== Early life and education ==
Itta was born in Barrow (now Utqiaġvik), Alaska on November 13, 1943 to parents Noah and Mollie Ungarook Itta, and was the second child of eleven born to them. Growing up, Itta was raised in the traditions of Iñupiat culture, speaking only Iñupiaq until she went off to school. Itta attended a school run by the Bureau of Indian Affairs and went on to graduate from Mount Edgecumbe High School in 1961. After High School, she attended Haskell Indian Junior College and graduated in 1965.

During her school-age years, she experienced first-hand the discrimination that Native Americans have faced in American society. She once recounted, "In school, I was sent to a corner if I ever spoke a word of Eskimo."

== Career and activism ==
In 1966, at age 22, she moved to Washington, D.C. to work as a receptionist to Senator Ernest Gruening, where she quickly became known as "that Eskimo girl." While in Washington, she served as a lobbyist for her region.

In 1971, Itta returned to Alaska to do community relations work for the Atlantic Richfield Company. During this time, Itta worked with many Iñupiat leaders and became heavily involved with land claim settlements and Native affairs in Alaska, spurred on by the interactions she had with people while serving as Senator Gruening's aide. Before she was elected to the state legislature, Itta was the City Manager of Barrow, Alaska. When considering a run at the State Legislature, Itta was elected unanimously by Native leaders and received their endorsement. Itta first ran for the Legislature in 1972, but lost the election.

From 1974 to 1976 she served as the first Alaska Native woman elected to the House of Representatives , where she served on the House Finance Committee and chaired the subcommittee on Health and Social Services. She co-sponsored the bill that created the Alaska Permanent Fund, which annually provides financial dividends to residents of the state of Alaska. Itta declined to run for subsequent term, "because [she] needed more inner confidence to better serve [her] people."

Itta was part of a group of young Native American activists who emerged as leaders in the Native rights movement. She, along with other Native rights activists such as Frances Degnan and Rosita Worl, sought to improve the standard of living for Native peoples through educational and professional opportunities. Itta, while supportive of the women's liberation movement, was skeptical of their methods, calling them "divisive."

Itta has held many positions throughout her career. She served as a Coordinator for the Post Secondary Education Program in the North Slope Borough School District. She also served as secretary for the Alaska State Democratic Central Committee, as a member of the executive board of the Alaska Native Foundation, and as a member of the Bush Justice Monitoring Committee, as well as held membership in the Alaska Legal Services.

Itta has continued her engagement with the Native American community, sharing her knowledge through institutions like the Eileen Panigeo MacLean House at the University of Alaska Fairbanks. In October 2022, Itta was selected as one of ten women to be inducted in the Alaska Women's Hall of Fame.

== Personal life ==
As of 2022, Itta-Lee was married to Johnny H. Lee and had two stepchildren and three grandchildren. She died September 25, 2025.

== See also ==
- List of Native American politicians
- Native American women in politics

Alaska House of Representatives
Preceded by District created	Member of the Alaska House of Representatives from the 21st district 1975–1977	Succeeded by Leo Schaeffer
