= Arctic Alaska =

Northern region of Alaska

Coordinates: 70°N 154°W

Map of the Arctic region, Alaska is in the upper left side, the Arctic Circle is shown in blue.

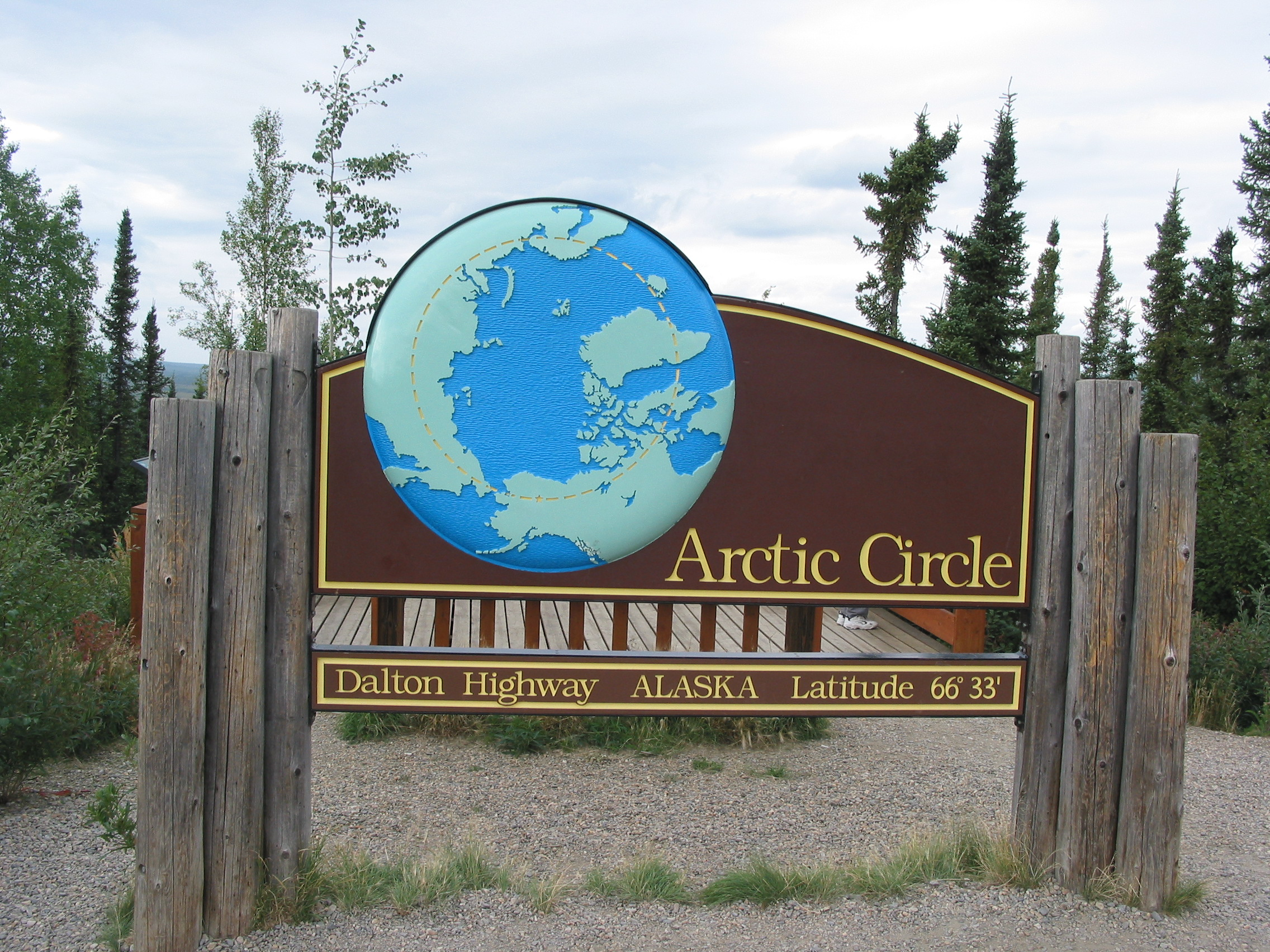
Sign indicating the point where the Dalton Highway crosses the Arctic Circle

Arctic Alaska or Far North Alaska is a region of the U.S. state of Alaska generally referring to the northern areas on or close to the Arctic Ocean.

It commonly includes North Slope Borough, Northwest Arctic Borough, Nome Census Area, and is sometimes taken to include parts of the Yukon-Koyukuk Census Area. Some notable towns there include Prudhoe Bay, Utqiaġvik, Kotzebue, Nome and Galena, although some of these are not in the Arctic Circle proper.

Most of these communities have no highways and can only be reached by aircraft or snowmobile in good weather. Originally inhabited by various Alaska Native groups living off hunting, whaling, or salmon fishing, modern settlement in Arctic Alaska was driven first by discoveries of gold and later on by the extraction of petroleum.

The ecosystem consists largely of tundra covering mountain ranges and coastal plains which are home to bears, wolves, sheep, muskoxen, caribou, and numerous species of birds, the north coast has been defined as the Arctic coastal tundra ecoregion. Arctic Alaska is also the location of the Arctic National Wildlife Refuge, Gates of the Arctic National Park and Preserve, Kobuk Valley National Park and the National Petroleum Reserve–Alaska. The Arctic experiences midnight sun in the summer and polar night in the winter.

== Climate ==
Most of northern Alaska has an Arctic climate with long, extremely cold winters and short, cool summers. Sunlight in northern Alaska is extremely rare with some days only having 3 hours of sunlight. The average temperatures during the summer months are only several degrees above freezing and the average temperatures during winter are as low as −20 to −30 °F (−29 to −34 °C), and can dip to −50 to −60 °F (−46 to −51 °C).

== See also ==
- Arctic Policy of the United States
- U.S. Arctic Research Commission
- North American Arctic
