= Point Barrow Refuge Station =

- U.S. National Register of Historic Places
- Alaska Heritage Resources Survey
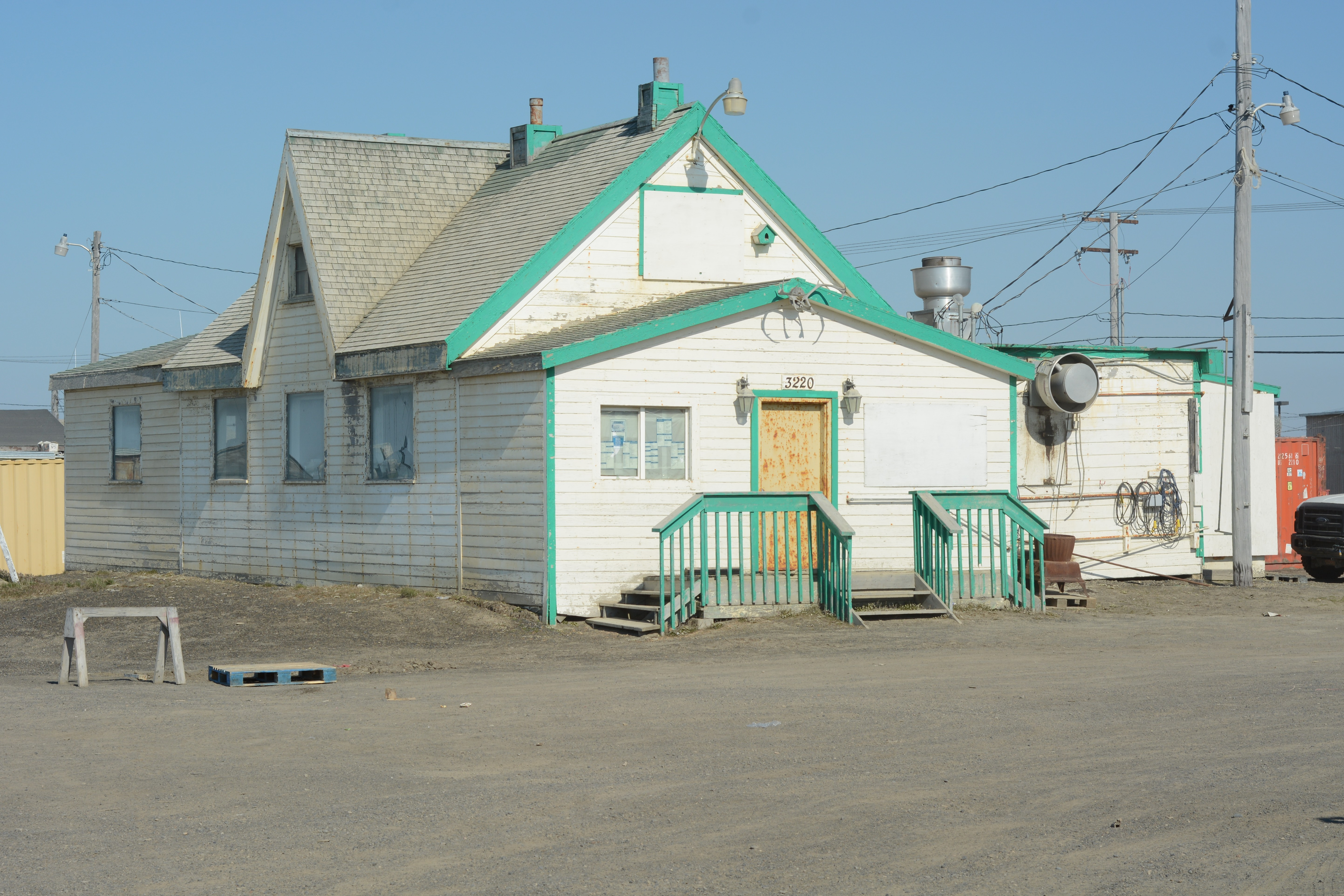

- Location within Alaska
- Location: Brower Street, Browerville, Utqiaġvik, Alaska
- Coordinates: 71°17′54″N 156°46′23″W
- Built: 1889
- Built by: United States Revenue Cutter Service
- NRHP reference No.: 80004563
- AHRS No.: BAR-012

Significant dates
- Added to NRHP: December 2, 1980
- Designated AHRS: November 24, 1972

The Point Barrow Refuge Station, also known as the Cape Smythe Whaling and Trading Station, is a historic wooden building in Utqiagvik, Alaska. The oldest wooden building along the Arctic coast of Alaska, it is located near Isatkoak Lagoon, 11 miles (18 km) south of Point Barrow, the northernmost point of the United States. It initially consisted of a large central room featuring 50 bunk beds, but the building was later expanded and converted for commercial use. Its former coal bunker was converted into a small kitchen and pantry. The building was listed on the National Register of Historic Places in 1980.

After a series of disasters and shipwrecks among the American whaling fleets in the Arctic Ocean during the late 1800s, the United States Revenue Cutter Service constructed a building to host stranded sailors near Point Barrow. The station operated from 1889 to 1896. Its superintendent Gilbert Bennett Borden sparked controversy after he conducted private trading in the region during his service, fought with whaling crews and his assistant-stationkeeper, and attempted to purchase a grounded schooner and outfit it with the station's provisions. Borden was removed in 1892 and the station saw little activity over the following years, before it was closed and sold to Cape Smyth Whaling and Trading Company manager Charles Brower in 1896. Brower expanded the building, and his son converted it into a restaurant, Brower's Cafe.

== Structure ==
The Point Barrow Refuge Station is a historic wooden building and former trading post in Utqiagvik, Alaska, 11 miles (18 km) south of Point Barrow, the northernmost point of the United States. It is located near the northwest corner of Isatkoak Lagoon in what was initially the village of Browersville, later annexed into the city. It is the oldest wooden building along the Arctic coast of Alaska. Before additions were constructed in the 20th century, the building measured 30 by 48 feet (9 by 15 m), or roughly 1,440 square feet (134 m^{2}). It had a large central room featuring 50 bunks. Attached was a large coal bunker at the northeast edge and a roofed vestibule to the southwest. After renovations, the front of the building was extended by about 15 feet (5 m), resulting in a floor area of 1,890 square feet (176 m^{2}). The coal bunker was also renovated into a small pantry and kitchen area, about 20 square feet (1.9 m^{2}) in area.

== History ==
The Alaskan North Slope, including Point Barrow, was traditionally inhabited by the Iñupiat and was discovered by Europeans in 1826, when it was sighted by the British explorer Frederick W. Beechey's expedition and named for his sponsor Sir John Barrow. Whaling activity came to the Arctic Ocean around Alaska after the discovery of large whale populations of 1848. Declining numbers of bowhead whales from overhunting led whaling ships to travel to more remote areas and stay later into the year. This led to many ships becoming trapped or destroyed by sea ice.

As part of the First International Polar Year in 1881, the United States Army Signal Corps lieutenant Patrick Henry Ray erected a meteorology and astronomy observation station south of Point Barrow, at the future site of the refuge station. An American whaling ship, the North Star, was destroyed by sea ice in July 1882, with its crew sheltering at the station until they were reunited with other whaling ships a month later. The meteorology station closed the following year, but the federal government leased the structure to the San Francisco-based Pacific Steam Whaling Company, then the largest whaling company in the northern Pacific. The company used it as a trading post and a base for shore whaling during the spring, and was mandated under the lease to care for the crew of any nearby shipwrecks.

Support grew among both whaling company leadership and government officials for the creation of a manned lifesaving station at Point Barrow. Josiah N. Knowles, the manager of the Pacific Steam Whaling Company, offered to establish a station at the site for the United States Life-Saving Service, but no action was taken. Several incidents among American whaling ships in the Arctic during the winter of 1888 prompted the United States Congress to consider a bill to establish stations along the Arctic in Alaska. Although whaling captains had proposed a system of stations along the most dangerous regions, Congress approved in 1889 the establishment of only a single refuge station, at Point Barrow.

=== Construction and operation ===
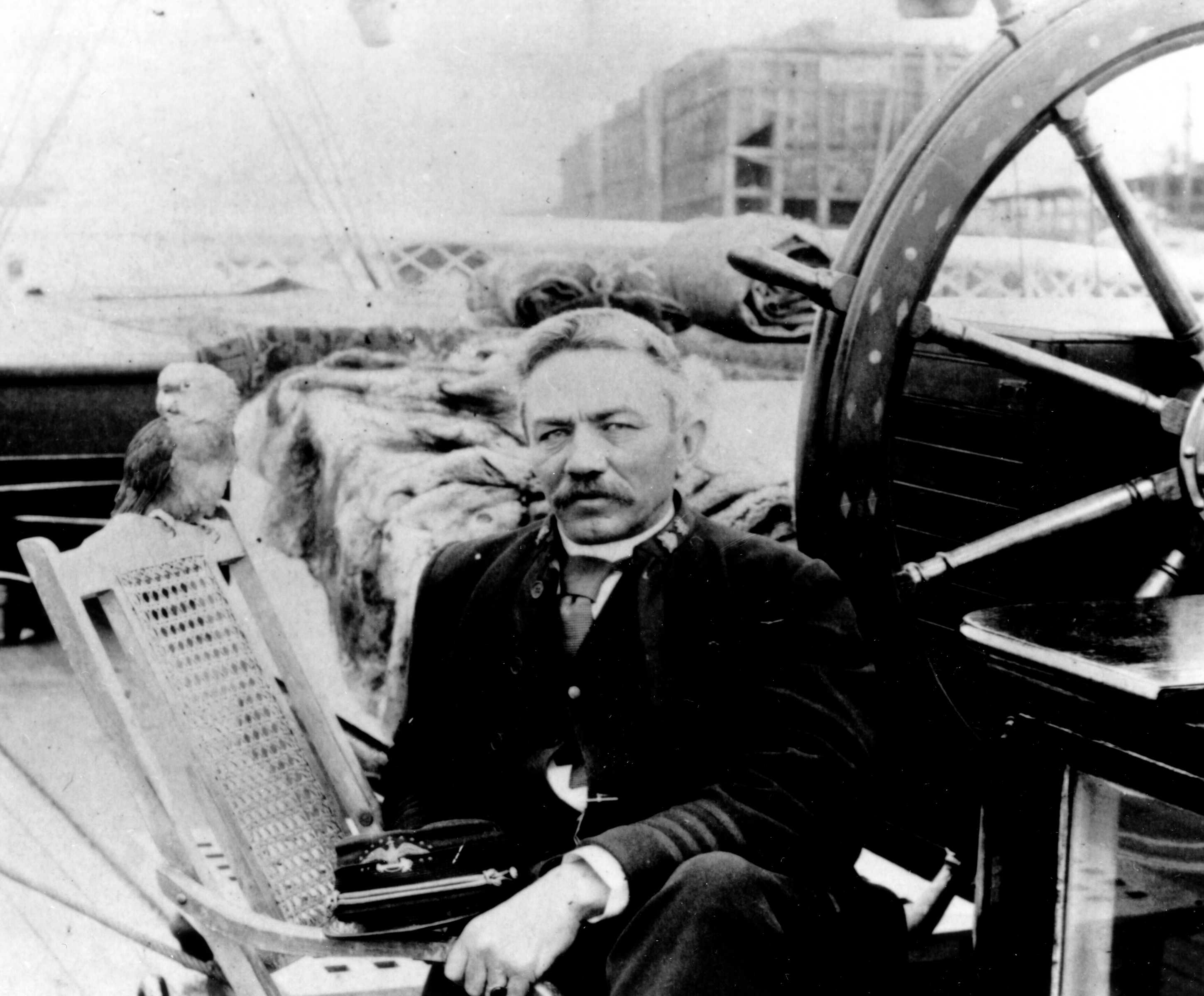
Captain Michael A. Healy, one of the managers of the station's construction, aboard the USS Bear in 1895

Several applicants competed for the position of superintendent of the station. These included the explorer William H. Gilder, the whaling agent Henry D. Woolfe, and the Signal Corps interpreter Edward P. Herendeen. Thanks to the sponsorship and advocacy of New Bedford customs collector Weston Howland, the retired whaling captain Gilbert Bennett Borden was appointed to the position in May 1889.

Construction of the station began in August 1889, at the site of the former signal station. It was assembled using precut lumber transported by USS Bear and USS Thetis. Three United States Revenue Cutter Service officers—Captain Michael A. Healy, Captain Charles Stockton, and Lieutenant David H. Jarvis—managed the construction, overseeing a team of carpenters recruited from nearby whaling ships. Fifty bunk-beds were installed in the station, alongside a large coal bunker and a year's supply of provisions.

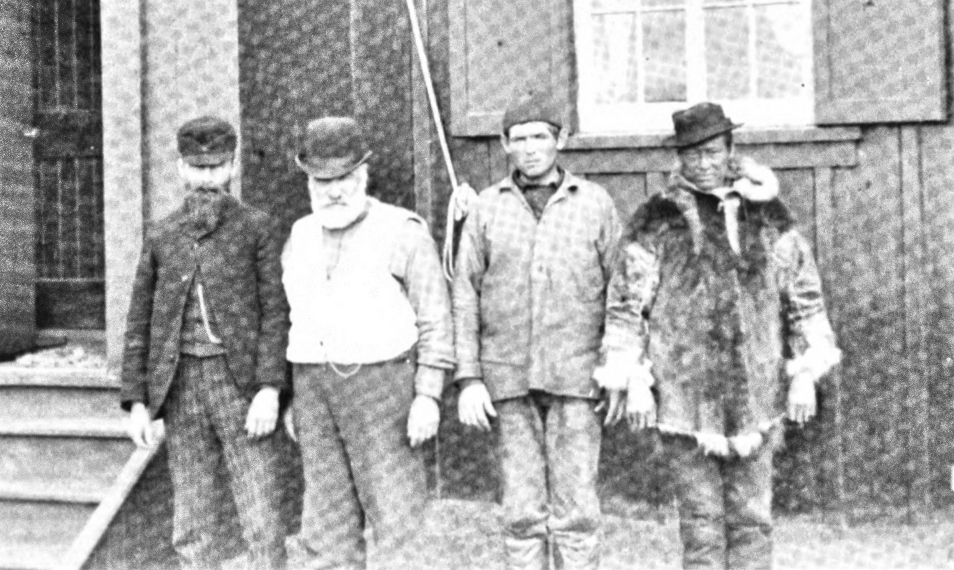
The station crew in 1891. From left to right: Leander Stevenson, Gilbert Borden, Frank Gotsche, and John Cuba

Borden moved to the building immediately following its construction, with his assistants Frank Gotsche and John Cuba. Borden had partnered with the San Francisco-based whaling merchant James McKenna, acquiring a large amount of dry goods to trade with the Iñupiat for furs and baleen. Local whalers and traders were frustrated by Borden's actions, as he had been subsidized by the government to transport goods to the station. Woolfe, serving as the manager of the Pacific Steam Whaling Company station as well as a correspondent for the San Francisco Chronicle, wrote an article criticizing Borden. This prompted the Secretary of the Treasury to contact Borden, who wrote that he had stopped trading after he learned it was against station regulations. However, Borden continued serving as a trading agent for McKenna until September 1891.

Borden planned to base a shore whaling crew from the station, but frequently came into conflicts with other traders and whalers in the region. Sheldon Jackson, Alaska's general agent of education, dispatched the missionary Leander Stevenson to serve as assistant station-keeper, intending to teach classes to local Iñupiat in the building until a separate school building could be built. Borden wrote letters in protest of the decision.

Most of the crew of the whaling schooner Silver Wave, outfitted by McKenna, abandoned the ship after it ran aground in the Seahorse Islands and sheltered at the Refuge Station. The Silver Wave's captain Peter Bayne unsuccessfully attempted to sell the ship. This led Borden to hold an auction at the station that December, whereupon he awarded the ship to himself with a $100 bid. Other whalers and agents protested the sale as illegal. Borden dispatched Bayne back to the ship, likely using some of the refuge station's supplies to outfit it. Bayne petitioned two weeks for further supplies, claiming that he had been poisoned by a recruit from another ship and needed supplies and medicine, but refused to return to the station.

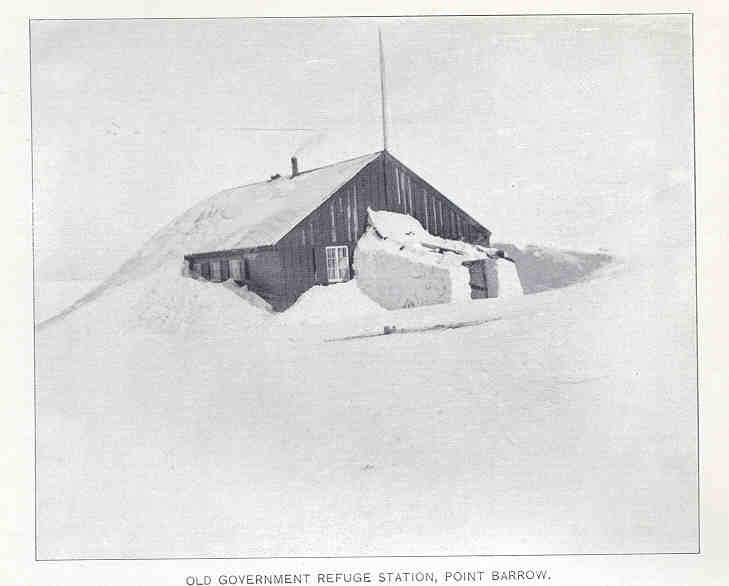
The former refuge station covered in snow, 1899

Stevenson and Gotsche rejected Bayne's requests for supplies, to Borden's anger. He threatened to close Stevenson's school and wrote to the treasury secretary several times over the following months, calling for Stevenson to be fired and giving reasons to assist Bayne. In 1891, Bayne left the ship without having received supplies and sold the Silver Wave to other whalers. Borden continued to write to the secretary, alleging a "powerful conspiracy" against him between Stevenson, Captain Healy, and the Pacific Steam Whaling Company. The following year, whaling merchants representing most of the American fleet in the Arctic petitioned the Secretary of the Treasury to fire Borden. In July 1892, Jarvis and Healy returned to Point Barrow, removing Borden and arresting Bayne.

Following Borden's removal, Stevenson became the superintendent of the station, before being replaced in 1893 by whaling captain Edward Akin. No major events occurred at the station over the following years, with it only briefly hosting crew from the lost barque Reindeer in August 1894. The support for the station by whaling interests had been soured, and proposals to close it down circulated, with Healy advocating for local whaling stations to instead care for stranded crews.

=== Later history ===
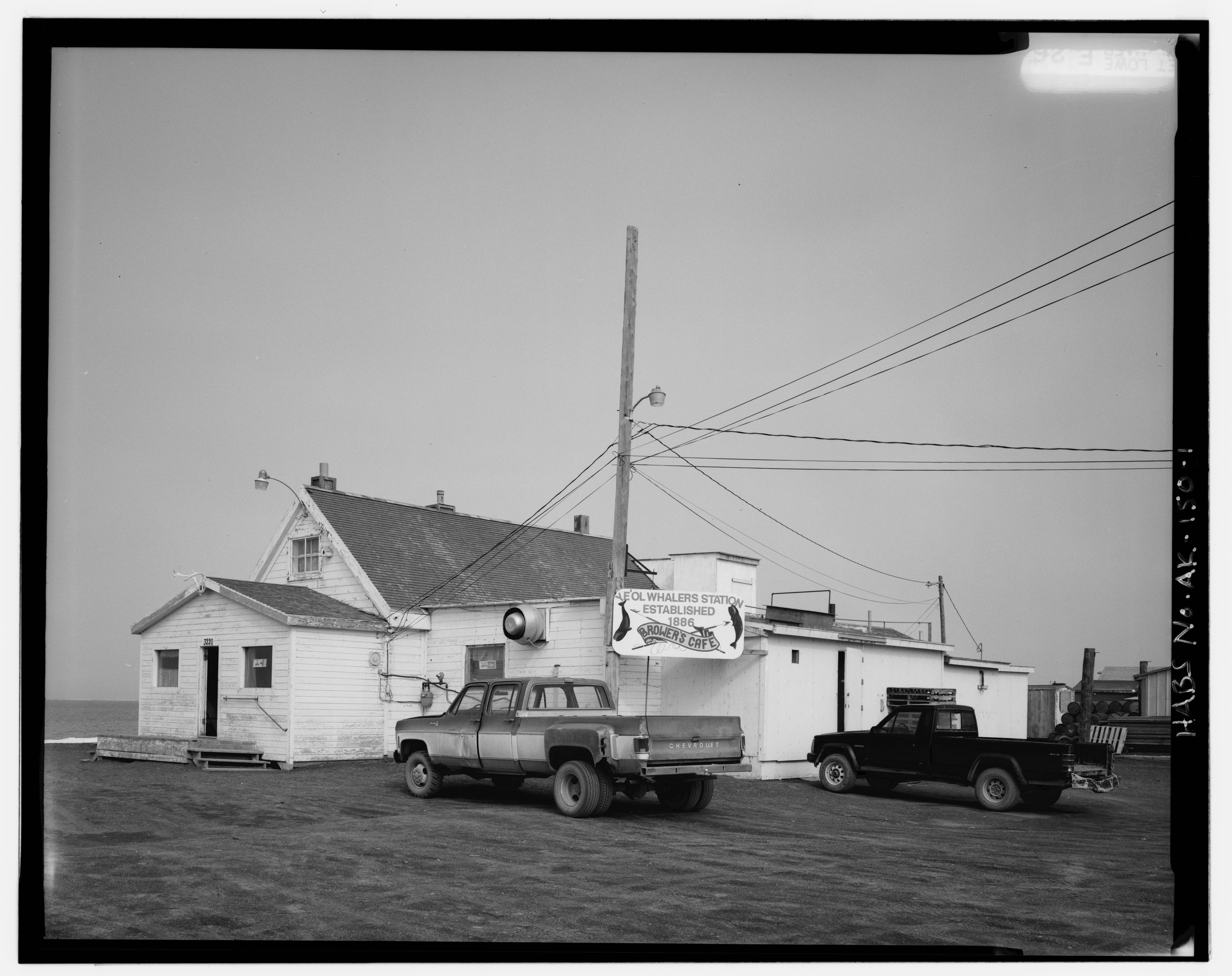
The station as seen from the southwest in 1991

In March 1896, the Revenue Cutter Service announced plans to auction the building. Knowles won the auction with a $4059 bid, but was not required to pay until the building could be inspected for damages. As many barrels of pork stored at the station were found to have spoiled, Knowles only needed to pay $3014, more than $5000 less than the station's estimated value in 1895. Knowles died soon after the building was transferred to the company in December 1896, and his business partners abandoned their operations in the area.

Naturalist Edward Avery McIlhenny rented out the station in 1897 and collected bird specimens. That winter, a whaling fleet of over a hundred men was stranded off Point Barrow, with four ships wrecked on the ice and four more left icebound. McIlhenny helped shelter some of the stranded whalers.

In 1898, the station was sold to Cape Smyth Whaling and Trading Company manager Charles Brower, who had previously operated a trading post from a nearby shack. The shack was salvaged and Brower moved into the building. The company later added a stoop. Around the 1920s, the building was renovated: the roof was raised and steepened in order to accommodate a second floor or attic, and the front was extended. Brower's son Tom Brower later opened a cafe in the building, expanding the coal bunker into a kitchen and pantry. It continued operating as the family-owned Brower's Cafe throughout the 20th century. The building was included within the Alaska Heritage Resources Survey in 1972 and listed on the National Register of Historic Places in 1980.
