= Wainwright, Alaska =

City in Alaska, United States

Wainwright Ulġuniq
- City
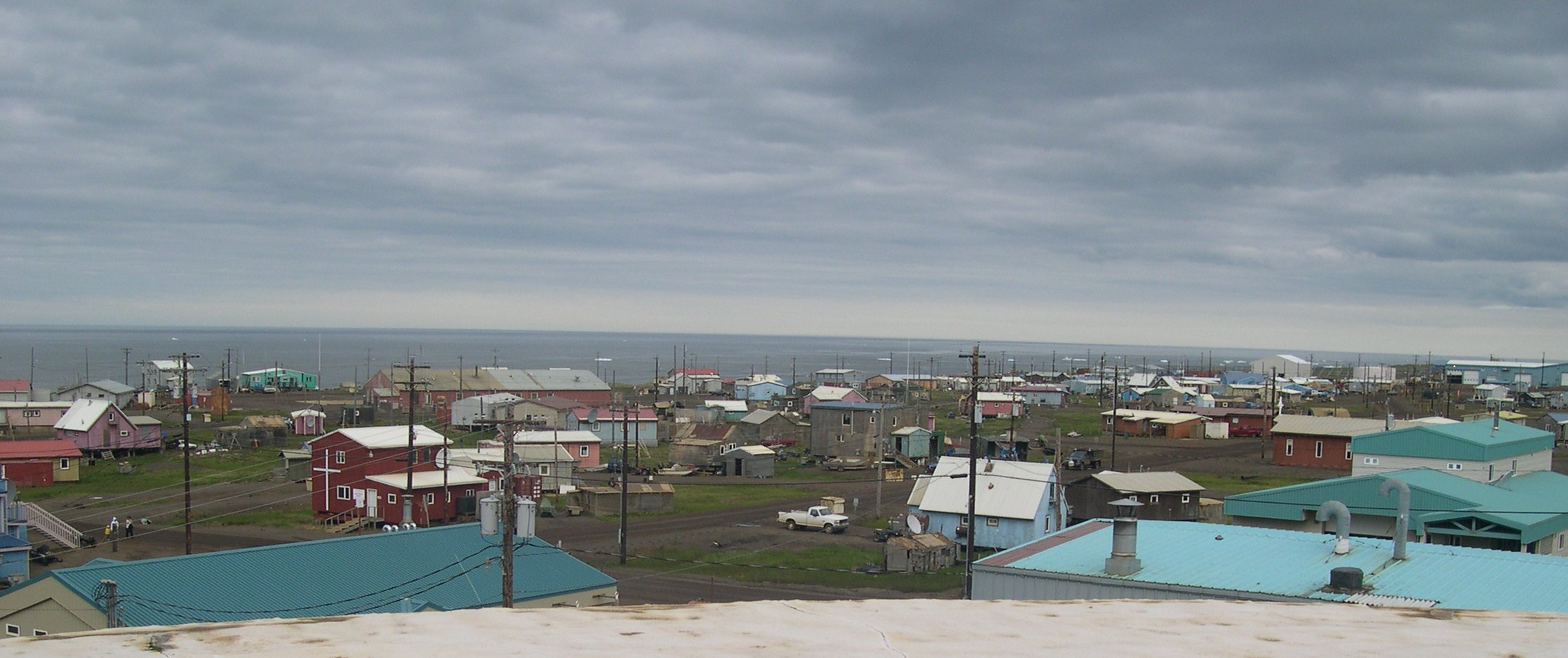
- Wainwright during the summer months with the Arctic Ocean in the background

- Location in Alaska
- Coordinates: 70°38′16″N 160°1′51″W
- Country: United States
- State: Alaska
- Borough: North Slope
- Incorporated: December 31, 1962

Government
  - Mayor: Cheryl Panik
  - State senator: Donny Olson (D)
  - State rep.: Robyn Burke (D)

Area
  - Total: 28.03 sq mi (72.61 km^{2})
  - Land: 10.31 sq mi (26.71 km^{2})
  - Water: 17.72 sq mi (45.90 km^{2})
- Elevation: 33 ft (10 m)

Population (2020)
  - Total: 628
  - Density: 60.9/sq mi (23.51/km^{2})
- Time zone: UTC−9 (Alaska (AKST))
  - Summer (DST): UTC−8 (AKDT)
- ZIP code: 99782
- Area code: 907
- FIPS code: 02-82750
- GNIS feature ID: 2418869

Wainwright (/ˈweɪnraɪt/; Ulġuniq in Iñupiaq), also known as Ulguniq or Kuuk, is a city in North Slope Borough, Alaska, United States. At the 2020 census, the population was 628, making it the third largest city in the North Slope Borough, up from 556 in 2010. The community was named after Wainwright Lagoon, which in turn was named after Lt. John Wainwright, an officer under Capt. F. W. Beechey, who were the first non-native people to travel to the lagoon in 1826. An unincorporated area known as Wainwright Inlet by 1890, Wainwright was founded as an incorporated municipality in 1962.

== History ==
The Wainwright area has long been inhabited by the Iñupiat, who called the region Ulġuniq. The Iñupiat were hunter-gatherers who participated in subsistence hunting and fishing, including the whaling of bowhead whales.

The English name Wainwright comes from nearby Wainwright Inlet, which was named after Lieutenant John Wainwright a by British naval officer in 1826. The present village was established in 1904, when the Alaska Native Service built a school there. Wainwright was incorporated as a city in 1962.

Olgoonik Corporation, Wainwright's Alaska Native village corporation, was established in 1973 under the Alaska Native Claims Settlement Act.

During the Cold War, a Distant Early Warning Line station was constructed near Wainwright in 1953, operating as a staffed facility until 1989, when was converted to an unstaffed Short Range Radar Station in 1994. The station was closed in 2008.

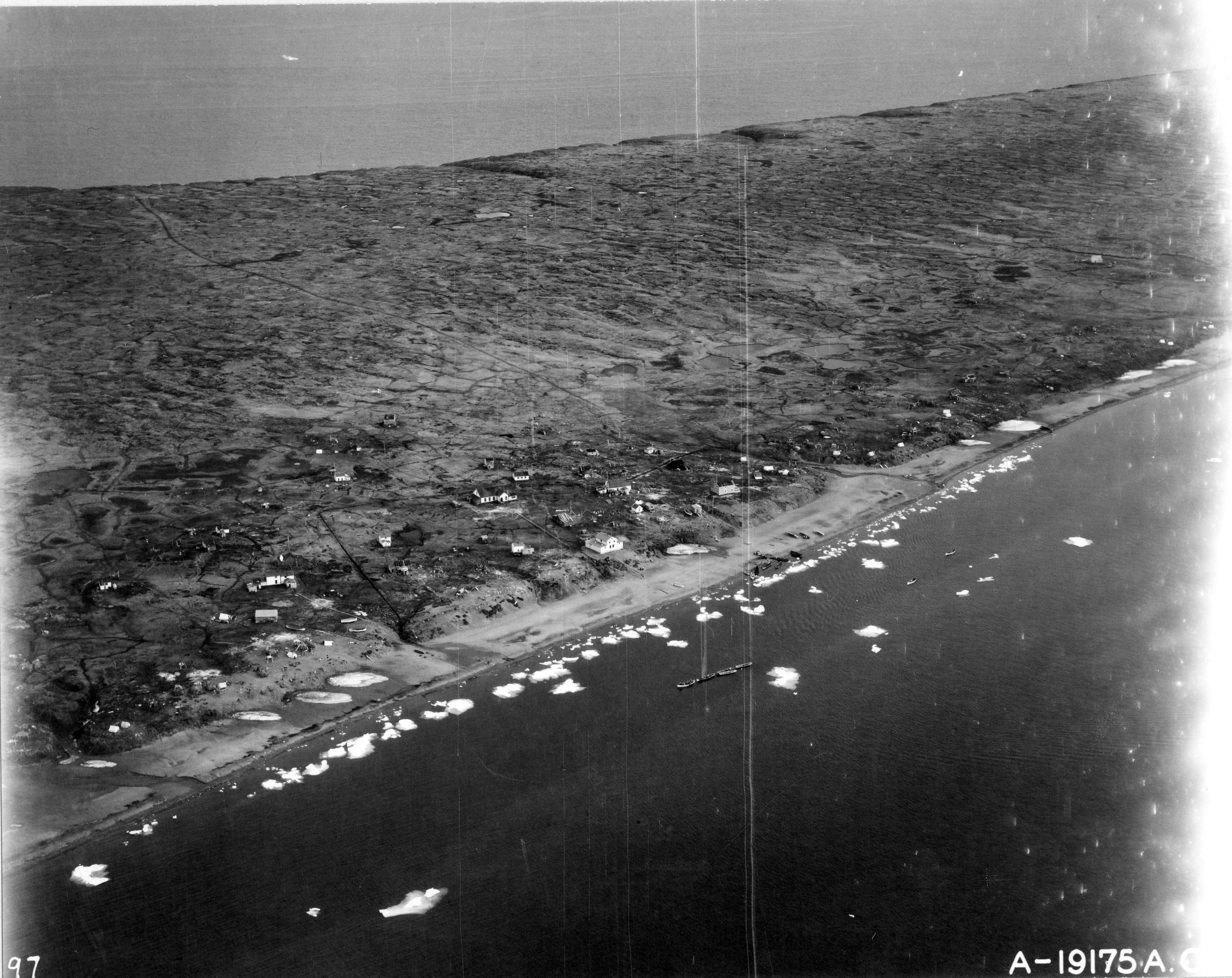
Wainwright in the 1940s

== Geography and climate ==
Wainwright is located on the Chukchi Sea about 72 miles (116 km) southwest of Utqiaġvik.

According to the United States Census Bureau, the city has a total area of 42.5 square miles (110 km^{2}), of which, 17.6 square miles (46 km^{2}) of it is land and 24.9 square miles (64 km^{2}) of it (58.63%) is water.

Wainwright has a dry-winter Arctic climate (Köppen ETw) with temperatures ranging from −56 to 84 °F (−49 to 29 °C). There is little precipitation, mostly snow; however, the dry winters make the annual snowfall totals more modest than they would otherwise be. The Chukchi Sea is unfrozen from early July to late September.

Climate data for Wainwright Airport, Alaska, 1991–2020 normals, extremes 1998–present
Month	Jan	Feb	Mar	Apr	May	Jun	Jul	Aug	Sep	Oct	Nov	Dec	Year
Record high °F (°C)	40 (4)	45 (7)	50 (10)	40 (4)	61 (16)	74 (23)	84 (29)	74 (23)	61 (16)	44 (7)	37 (3)	35 (2)	84 (29)
Mean maximum °F (°C)	20.9 (−6.2)	24.1 (−4.4)	17.4 (−8.1)	29.8 (−1.2)	44.7 (7.1)	65.4 (18.6)	69.6 (20.9)	62.1 (16.7)	54.3 (12.4)	38.0 (3.3)	30.2 (−1.0)	24.1 (−4.4)	71.1 (21.7)
Mean daily maximum °F (°C)	−3.9 (−19.9)	−4.7 (−20.4)	−3.5 (−19.7)	10.8 (−11.8)	28.9 (−1.7)	45.9 (7.7)	52.2 (11.2)	48.5 (9.2)	38.9 (3.8)	25.7 (−3.5)	11.8 (−11.2)	−0.3 (−17.9)	20.9 (−6.2)
Daily mean °F (°C)	−10.8 (−23.8)	−11.4 (−24.1)	−10.6 (−23.7)	3.8 (−15.7)	24.1 (−4.4)	39.4 (4.1)	45.5 (7.5)	43.1 (6.2)	34.9 (1.6)	20.9 (−6.2)	5.4 (−14.8)	−6.6 (−21.4)	14.8 (−9.6)
Mean daily minimum °F (°C)	−17.6 (−27.6)	−18.2 (−27.9)	−17.8 (−27.7)	−3.3 (−19.6)	19.4 (−7.0)	33.0 (0.6)	38.8 (3.8)	37.8 (3.2)	30.9 (−0.6)	16.0 (−8.9)	−1.0 (−18.3)	−12.9 (−24.9)	8.8 (−12.9)
Mean minimum °F (°C)	−34.6 (−37.0)	−36.7 (−38.2)	−32.3 (−35.7)	−21.9 (−29.9)	1.5 (−16.9)	25.9 (−3.4)	33.3 (0.7)	31.7 (−0.2)	22.4 (−5.3)	0.7 (−17.4)	−18.7 (−28.2)	−29.7 (−34.3)	−40.2 (−40.1)
Record low °F (°C)	−50 (−46)	−53 (−47)	−47 (−44)	−29 (−34)	−14 (−26)	18 (−8)	27 (−3)	23 (−5)	14 (−10)	−16 (−27)	−33 (−36)	−44 (−42)	−53 (−47)
Average precipitation inches (mm)	0.02 (0.51)	0.02 (0.51)	0.03 (0.76)	0.06 (1.5)	0.19 (4.8)	0.45 (11)	0.94 (24)	0.73 (19)	0.31 (7.9)	0.17 (4.3)	0.13 (3.3)	0.05 (1.3)	3.1 (78.88)
Average precipitation days (≥ 0.01 in)	0.8	1.0	1.3	1.1	3.8	6.3	9.6	9.8	7.2	6.2	3.6	2.1	52.8
Source 1: NOAA
Source 2: National Weather Service (mean maxima and minima, precip/precip days 2006–2020)

== Demographics ==
Historical population
Census	Pop.	Note	%±
1890	72		—
1920	99		—
1930	197		99.0%
1940	341		73.1%
1950	227		−33.4%
1960	253		11.5%
1970	315		24.5%
1980	405		28.6%
1990	492		21.5%
2000	546		11.0%
2010	556		1.8%
2020	628		12.9%
U.S. Decennial Census

Wainwright first appeared on the 1890 U.S. Census as the unincorporated area of "Wainwright Inlet." This included the native settlement Kugmiut, camps on Kug River, Setorokamiut, Nuklwok, Nutnago and Shinnowok. All 72 residents were native. It did not appear again on the census until 1920, this time as Wainwright. It was formally incorporated in 1962.

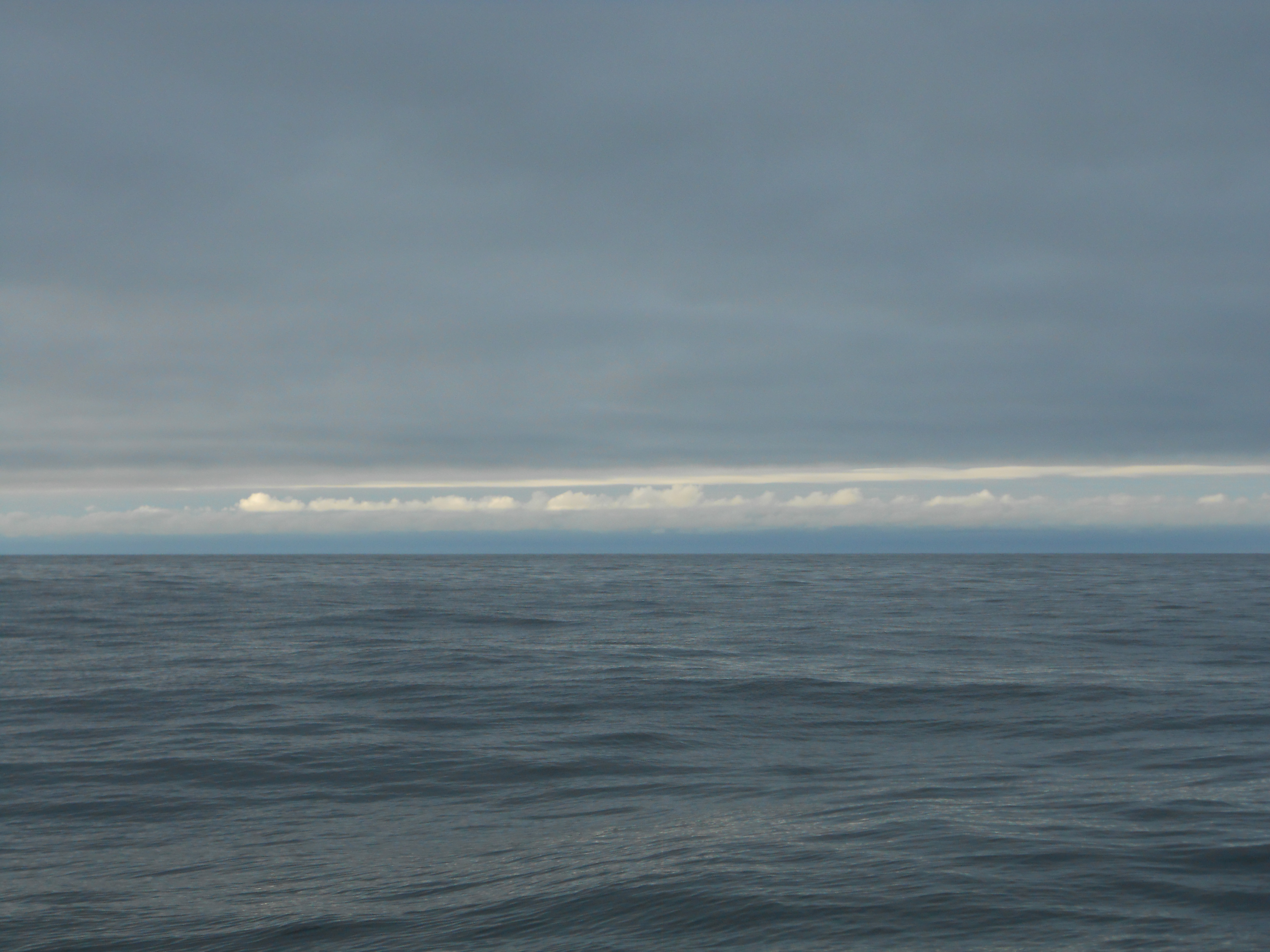
On August 18, 1778, at this location (70 44N) off Wainwright and 50 miles or so North of Icy Cape, Captain James Cook decided that his path North through the Northwest passage was completely blocked by ice and turned South again. Photo taken July 24, 2017.

=== 2020 census ===
As of the 2020 census, Wainwright had a population of 628. The median age was 27.1 years. 35.7% of residents were under the age of 18 and 6.5% of residents were 65 years of age or older. For every 100 females there were 109.3 males, and for every 100 females age 18 and over there were 107.2 males age 18 and over.

0.0% of residents lived in urban areas, while 100.0% lived in rural areas.

There were 156 households in Wainwright, of which 57.1% had children under the age of 18 living in them. Of all households, 34.0% were married-couple households, 25.6% were households with a male householder and no spouse or partner present, and 27.6% were households with a female householder and no spouse or partner present. About 21.1% of all households were made up of individuals and 5.1% had someone living alone who was 65 years of age or older.

There were 177 housing units, of which 11.9% were vacant. The homeowner vacancy rate was 0.0% and the rental vacancy rate was 0.0%.

Racial composition as of the 2020 census
Race	Number	Percent
White	21	3.3%
Black or African American	4	0.6%
American Indian and Alaska Native	600	95.5%
Asian	0	0.0%
Native Hawaiian and Other Pacific Islander	0	0.0%
Some other race	0	0.0%
Two or more races	3	0.5%
Hispanic or Latino (of any race)	3	0.5%

=== 2010 census ===
As of the 2010 United States census, there were 556 people living in the city. The racial makeup of the city was 90.1% Native American, 7.9% White and 1.6% from two or more races. 0.4% were Hispanic or Latino of any race.

=== 2000 census ===
At the 2000 census, there were 546 people, 148 households and 117 families living in the city. The population density was 31.1 inhabitants per square mile (12.0/km^{2}). There were 179 housing units at an average density of 10.2 per square mile (3.9/km^{2}). The racial makeup of the city was 6.78% White, 0.18% Black or African American, 90.29% Native American, and 2.75% from two or more races.

There were 148 households, of which 50.0% had children under the age of 18 living with them, 50.7% were married couples living together, 16.2% had a female householder with no husband present, and 20.3% were non-families. 18.2% of all households were made up of individuals, and 3.4% had someone living alone who was 65 years of age or older. The average household size was 3.69 and the average family size was 4.17.

37.7% of the population were under the age of 18, 13.4% from 18 to 24, 27.8% from 25 to 44, 14.3% from 45 to 64, and 6.8% who were 65 years of age or older. The median age was 24 years. For every 100 females, there were 114.1 males. For every 100 females age 18 and over, there were 117.9 males.

The median household income was $54,722 and the median family income was $58,125. Males had a median income of $36,667 versus $40,313 for females. The per capita income for the city was $16,709. About 8.5% of families and 12.5% of the population were below the poverty line, including 18.4% of those under age 18 and 5.3% of those age 65 or over.

== Education ==
There is one school in Wainwright, the Alak School of the North Slope Borough School District, which serves students pre-kindergarten through grade 12.

== See also ==
- The blob (Chukchi Sea algae)
- Wainwright Airport
