= North Slope Borough, Alaska =

Borough in Alaska, United States

- Borough
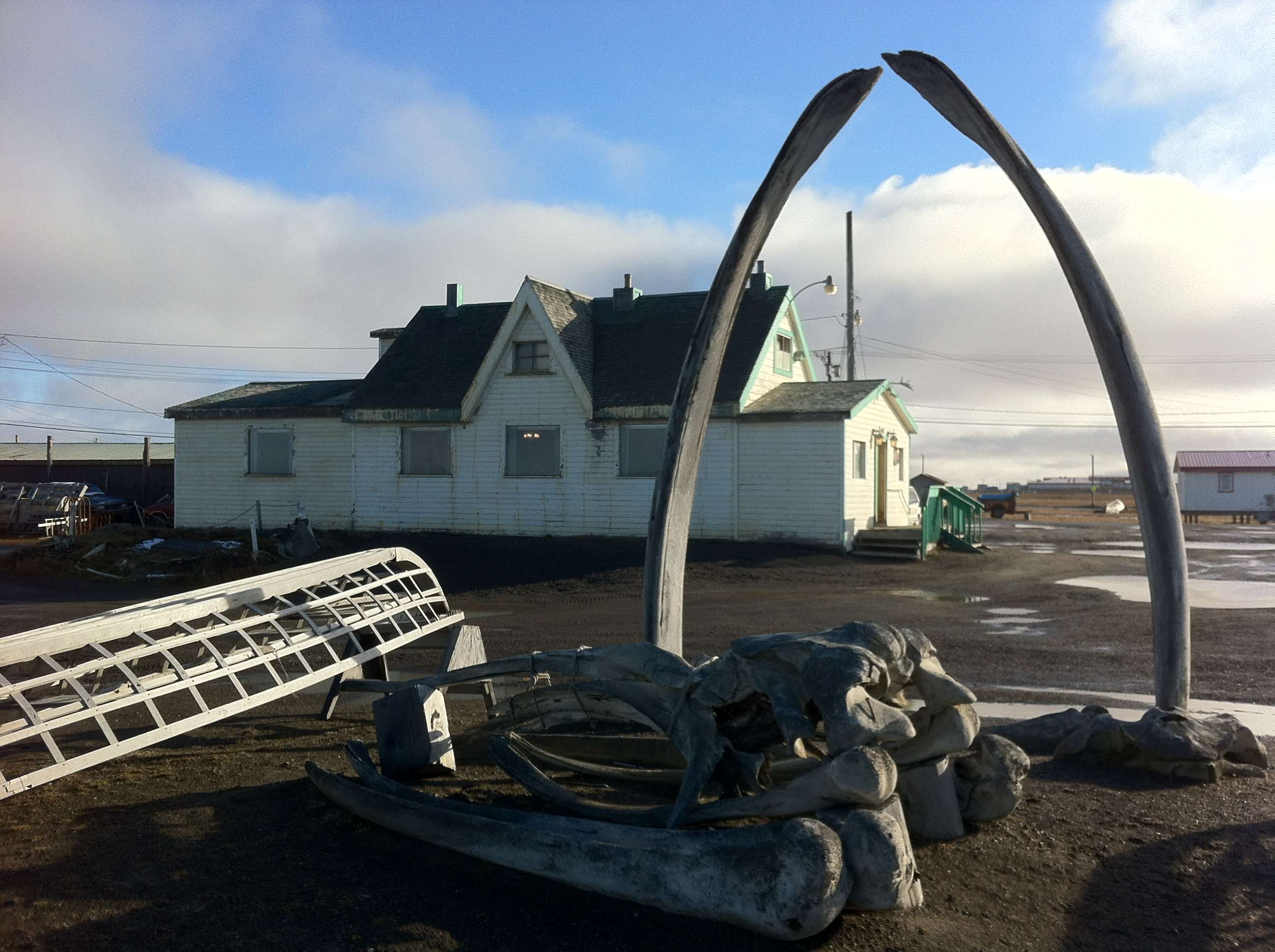
- Point Barrow Refuge Station

- Seal

- Location within the U.S. state of Alaska
- Coordinates: 69°18′N 153°27′W
- Country: United States
- State: Alaska
- Incorporated: July 2, 1972
- Named for: Alaska North Slope
- Seat: Utqiaġvik
- Largest city: Utqiaġvik

Government
  - Mayor: Josiah Patkotak (I)

Area
  - Total: 94,796 sq mi (245,520 km^{2})
  - Land: 88,695 sq mi (229,720 km^{2})
  - Water: 6,101 sq mi (15,800 km^{2}) 6.4%

Population (2020)
  - Total: 11,031
  - Estimate (2025): 10,582 ▼
  - Density: 0.12437/sq mi (0.048020/km^{2})
- Time zone: UTC−9 (Alaska)
  - Summer (DST): UTC−8 (ADT)
- Congressional district: At-large
- Website: www.north-slope.org

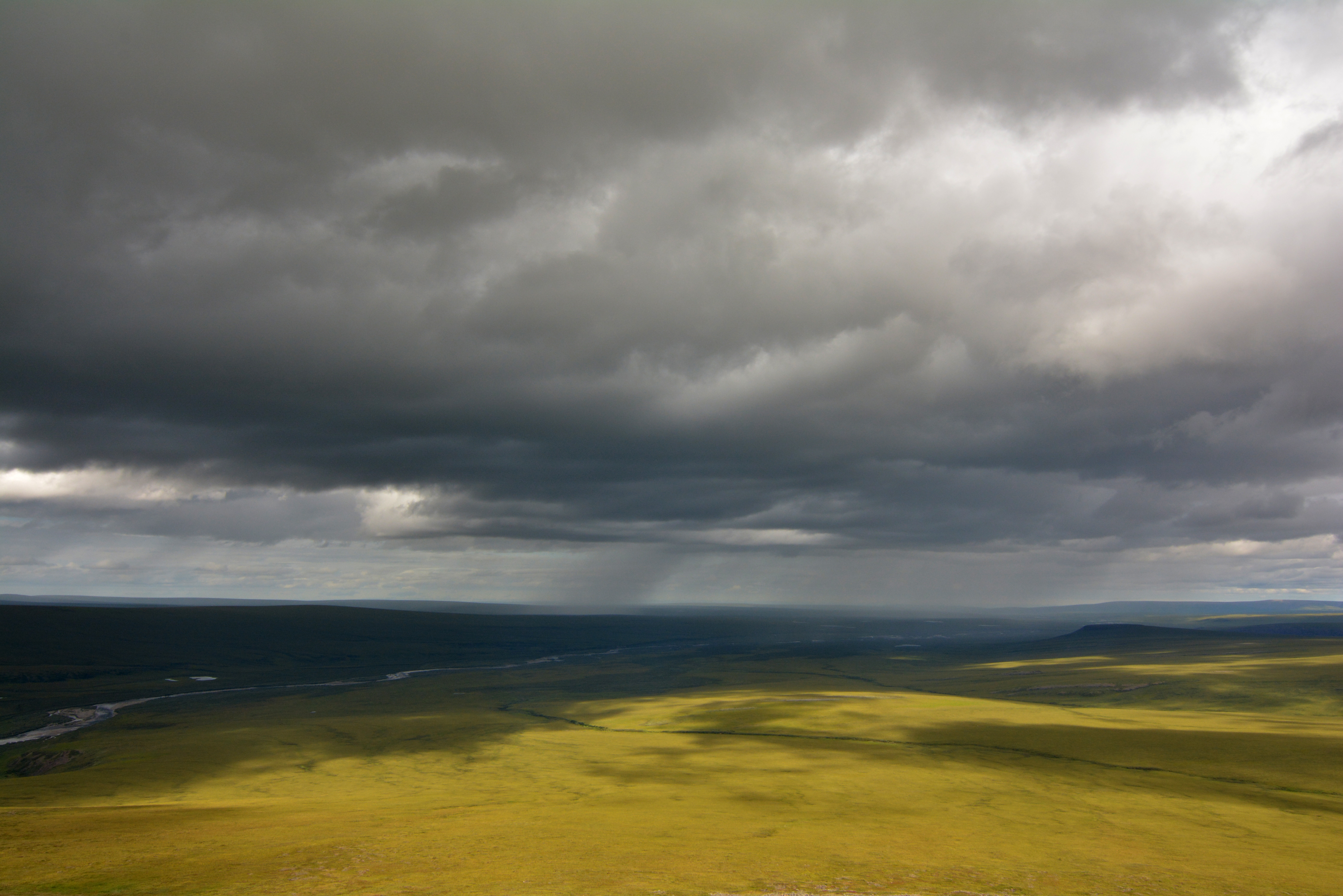
The Anaktuvuk River flows North toward the Arctic Ocean. Much of the North Slope Borough is characterized by vast, uninhabited gently rolling tundra.

The North Slope Borough is the northernmost borough in the US state of Alaska and, thus, the northernmost county or equivalent of the United States as a whole. As of the 2020 census, the population was 11,031. The borough seat and largest city, comprising nearly half of the borough’s population, is Utqiaġvik (known as Barrow from 1901 to 2016), the northernmost settlement in the United States.

== History ==
The borough was established in 1972 by an election of the majority Indigenous people in the region, following Congressional passage of the Alaska Native Claims Settlement Act. Most are Inupiat. The borough was named for the Alaska North Slope basin. In 1974, it adopted a Home Rule Charter, enabling it to exercise any legitimate governmental power. The borough has first-class status and exercises the powers of planning, zoning, taxation, and schools.

In 2020, the airline Ravn Alaska went into bankruptcy and ended operations. The government of North Slope Borough attempted to take control of the airline's assets to keep flights and shipments coming to the community, but the Alaska Attorney General stated that the borough did not have that authority.

== Government ==
The borough is governed by an eleven-member assembly, elected to staggered three-year terms, which meets monthly. Representation on the assembly is apportioned among the various communities; Utqiaġvik is allotted six seats, Nuiqsut, Point Hope, and Wainwright one seat apiece, while the remaining two seats combine two communities; Anaktuvuk Pass with Kaktovik and Atqasuk with Point Lay. The borough's executive and administrative powers are vested in a mayor, who is limited to two consecutive three-year terms.

=== Mayors ===
- 1972–1980: Eben Hopson (died in office)
- 1980–1981: Jacob Anaġi Adams, Sr.
- 1981–1984: Eugene Brower
- 1984–1990: George Ahmaogak, Sr.
- 1990–1993: Jeslie Kaleak
- 1993–1996: George Ahmaogak, Sr.
- 1996–1999: Benjamin Nageak
- 1999–2005: George Ahmaogak, Sr.
- 2005–2011: Edward Itta
- 2011–2016: Charlotte Brower
- 2016–2023: Harry Brower, Jr.
- 2023–present: Josiah Patkotak

=== Politics ===
United States presidential election results for North Slope Borough, Alaska
Year	Republican		Democratic		Third party(ies)	
Year	No.	%	No.	%	No.	%
1960	348	39.55%	532	60.45%	0	0.00%
1964	243	23.55%	789	76.45%	0	0.00%
1968	473	34.91%	690	50.92%	192	14.17%
1972	325	35.10%	560	60.48%	41	4.43%
1976	339	32.85%	655	63.47%	38	3.68%
1980	507	43.59%	460	39.55%	196	16.85%
1984	929	60.09%	575	37.19%	42	2.72%
1988	916	53.32%	713	41.50%	89	5.18%
1992	666	35.02%	763	40.12%	473	24.87%
1996	949	43.10%	927	42.10%	326	14.80%
2000	1,485	57.99%	843	32.92%	233	9.10%
2004	1,171	57.68%	767	37.78%	92	4.53%
2008	1,252	52.69%	1,041	43.81%	83	3.49%
2012	735	32.92%	1,407	63.01%	91	4.08%
2016	802	34.58%	1,090	47.00%	427	18.41%
2020	1,197	47.92%	1,134	45.40%	167	6.69%
2024	939	54.28%	690	39.88%	101	5.84%

North Slope Borough has generally hosted competitive elections, it has only backed a Democrat for president three times since 1980.

Former mayor Eugene Brower, Charlotte Brower's husband, was convicted of tax evasion involving contractor kickbacks in the 1980s.

Former mayor George Ahmaogak had billed the Borough for a family vacation in Hawaii. His wife, Maggie, was later convicted of embezzlement by the Alaska Eskimo Whaling Commission in 2015.

Edward Itta succeeded George Ahmaogak and served two terms, 2005–2011. In 2011, Charlotte Brower defeated Ahmaogak in a runoff election after his Hawaii vacation was revealed. She was recalled in April 2016, after it was reported the year before that her office had made numerous donations to individuals (including family members), sports clubs, and other groups that amounted to more than $800,000 since 2011.

In July 2016, Harry K. Brower Jr., Charlotte Brower's brother-in-law, was first elected in a run-off election to serve the rest of Charlotte Brower's second term.

Harry K. Brower Jr. ran for a full term as mayor in October 2017 but was forced into a November runoff against his nephew, Frederick Brower, where he easily won a full 3-year term.

== Geography ==
According to the United States Census Bureau, the borough has a total area of 94,796 square miles (245,520 km^{2}), of which 88,695 square miles (229,720 km^{2}) is land and 6,101 square miles (15,800 km^{2}) (6.4%) is water. The borough is larger than 39 states.

Its western coastline is along the Chukchi Sea, while its eastern shores (beyond Point Barrow) are on the Beaufort Sea.

The North Slope Borough is the largest county-level political subdivision in the United States by area, with a larger land area than the state of Utah, the 13th-largest state in the nation. Although the adjacent Yukon–Koyukuk Census Area is larger in area, it has no borough-level government. The borough is the fourth-least densely populated county-level entity in the United States. The Yukon–Koyukuk Census Area is the least densely populated county-level entity.

=== Adjacent boroughs and census areas ===
- Yukon–Koyukuk Census Area, Alaska – southeast
- Northwest Arctic Borough, Alaska – southwest

It shares its eastern border with Yukon, Canada, which has no subdivisions.

=== National protected areas ===
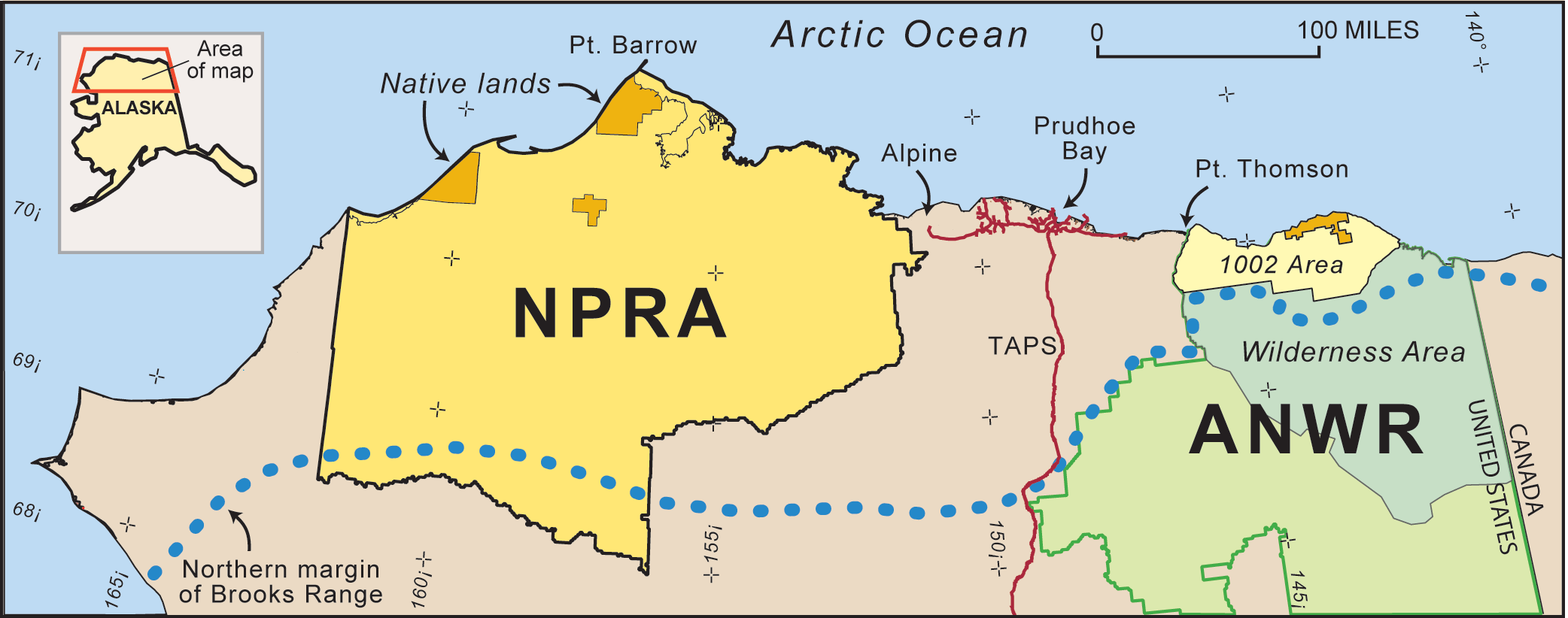
Map of northern Alaska showing location of Arctic National Wildlife Refuge (ANWR), and the National Petroleum Reserve–Alaska (NPRA).

- Alaska Maritime National Wildlife Refuge (part of the Chukchi Sea unit)
  - Cape Lisburne
  - Cape Thompson
- Arctic National Wildlife Refuge (part)
  - Mollie Beattie Wilderness (part)
- Gates of the Arctic National Park and Preserve (part)
  - Gates of the Arctic Wilderness (part)
- Noatak National Preserve (part)
  - Noatak Wilderness (part)

=== Other federal areas ===
- National Petroleum Reserve–Alaska

=== Major highway ===
- AK-11

Due to the extreme north and wilderness, the only major road connecting the North Slope with the rest of the state is AK-11, which runs parallel to the Trans-Alaska Pipeline System. All roads in the North Slope Borough are closed to the public, unless it is maintained by the Alaska Department of Transportation and Public Facilities (Alaska DOT&PF)

== Demographics ==
Historical population
Census	Pop.	Note	%±
1960	2,133		—
1970	2,663		24.8%
1980	4,199		57.7%
1990	5,979		42.4%
2000	7,385		23.5%
2010	9,430		27.7%
2020	11,031		17.0%
2025 (est.)	10,582	▼	−4.1%
U.S. Decennial Census; 1790-1960 1900-1990; 1990-2000 2010-2020

=== 2020 census ===
As of the 2020 census, the borough had 11,031 people and the median age was 33.4 years. 7.9% of residents were under the age of 5, 25.9% were under the age of 18, 65.7% were between the ages of 18 and 64, and 6.1% were aged 65 or older; 4.6% of the population were veterans and 6.3% were born outside of the United States.

62.4% of the population were male and 37.6% were female, yielding 163.2 males for every 100 females and 193.0 males for every 100 females age 18 and over.

There were 2,190 households, of which 51.4% had children under the age of 18 living with them and 27.7% had a female householder with no spouse or partner present. About 23.5% of all households were made up of individuals and 6.3% had someone living alone who was 65 years of age or older. The average household size was 3.36 people.

There were 2,619 housing units, of which 16.4% were vacant. Among occupied housing units, 46.6% were owner-occupied and 53.4% were renter-occupied. The homeowner vacancy rate was 0.1% and the rental vacancy rate was 3.2%.

The racial makeup was 27.9% White, 1.5% Black or African American, 52.1% American Indian and Alaska Native, 5.8% Asian, 2.9% Native Hawaiian and Other Pacific Islander, 1.1% from some other race, and 8.7% from two or more races, with Hispanic or Latino residents of any race comprising 5.0% of the population.

0.0% of residents lived in urban areas, while 100.0% lived in rural areas.

=== 2010 census ===
As of the census of 2010, 9,430 people, 2,109 households, and 1,524 families residing in the borough. The population density was 12.03 square miles (31.2 km^{2}) per person. There were 2,538 housing units at an average density of 35 square miles (91 km^{2}) per unit. The racial makeup of the borough was 33.37% White, 1% Black or African American, 54.08% Native American (mostly Iñupiat), 4.51% Asian, 1.1% Pacific Islander, 0.71% from other races, and 5.23% from two or more races. 2.64% of the population was Hispanic or Latino of any race. 42.84% reported speaking Iñupiaq or "Eskimo" at home, while 4.21% reported speaking Tagalog.

=== 2000 census ===
As of the census of 2000, there were 7,385 people. The racial makeup was 17.09% White, 0.72% Black or African American, 68.38% Native American (mostly Iñupiat), 5.92% Asian, 0.84% Pacific Islander, 0.50% from other races, and 6.55% from two or more races. 2.37% of the population was Hispanic or Latino of any race.

There were 2,109 households, out of which 48.10% had children under the age of 18 living with them, 43.3% were married couples living together, 18.3% had a female householder with no husband present, and 27.70% were non-families. 21.4% of all households comprised individuals, and 1.9% had someone who was 65 or older living alone. The average household size was 3.45, and the average family size was 4.05.

The borough's population was spread out, with 38.2% under 18, 9.50% from 18 to 24, 30.1% from 25 to 44, 18.10% from 45 to 64, and 4.2% who were 65 or older. The median age was 27 years. For every 100 females, there were 112.50 males. For every 100 females age 18 and over, there were 113.90 males.

=== Racial and ethnic composition ===
North Slope Borough, Alaska – Racial and ethnic composition Note: the US Census treats Hispanic/Latino as an ethnic category. This table excludes Latinos from the racial categories and assigns them to a separate category. Hispanics/Latinos may be of any race.
Race / Ethnicity (NH = Non-Hispanic)	Pop 2000	Pop 2010	Pop 2020	% 2000	% 2010	% 2020
White alone (NH)	1,228	3,059	2,964	16.63%	32.44%	26.87%
Black or African American alone (NH)	51	91	159	0.69%	0.97%	1.44%
Native American or Alaska Native alone (NH)	4,982	5,046	5,680	67.46%	53.51%	51.49%
Asian alone (NH)	435	414	636	5.89%	4.39%	5.77%
Native Hawaiian or Pacific Islander alone (NH)	59	103	321	0.80%	1.09%	2.91%
Other race alone (NH)	3	7	30	0.04%	0.07%	0.27%
Mixed race or Multiracial (NH)	452	461	693	6.12%	4.89%	6.28%
Hispanic or Latino (any race)	175	249	548	2.37%	2.64%	4.97%
Total	7,385	9,430	11,031	100.00%	100.00%	100.00%

Top ten most self-reported ancestries in North Slope Borough (American Community Survey 2020 five-year estimates)
Ancestry	Percentage of population
Iñupiat	50.72%
Alaska Native tribes, not specified	5.82%
Filipino	5.21%
Black or African American	3.78%
Samoan	2.85%
Irish	2.45%
German	1.95%
Mexican	1.40%
Alaskan Athabaskan	0.94%
Native Hawaiian	0.78%
European	0.75%

== Economics ==
"Among all North Slope Borough communities, a higher percentage of Nuiqsut households use subsistence resources for more than half of their diet."

== Communities ==
=== Cities ===
- Anaktuvuk Pass
- Atqasuk
- Kaktovik
- Nuiqsut
- Point Hope
- Utqiagvik (Borough seat)
- Wainwright

=== Census-designated places ===
- Point Lay
- Prudhoe Bay

=== Unincorporated communities ===
- Alpine
- Deadhorse
- Sagwon
- Umiat

== Education ==
The borough has a single school district: North Slope Borough School District. It is also the largest school district in the United States by area, totaling 229,731 km^{2} (88,700 sq mi)

== See also ==
- List of airports in Alaska
- Nalukataq
- Thetis Mound
