= Nuvuk site =

Former village at Point Barrow, Alaska, US

Nuvuk, once Alaska's northernmost village, was located at the tip of Point Barrow, Alaska. In the Inupiaq language the name means "point" or "promontory of land" and refers both to the landform and the village. Archaeological evidence indicates that Point Barrow was occupied for over 1,500 years prior to the arrival of the first Europeans. Occupation continued into the 1940s. The headland is an important archaeological site, yielding Ipiutak artifacts, many burials and artifacts associated with the Thule culture, as well as artifacts from pre- and post-contact Ipiutak occupation.

== Research ==
=== Explorers ===
The first recorded visit of non-Natives to Nuvuk took place in 1826, in the form of an expedition led by Captain Frederick William Beechey of the British Royal Navy, in command of the fifteen-gun sloop HMS Blossom. Although Beechey and Blossom did not get far past Icy Cape due to ice and shoal water, Blossom’s barge under the command of Thomas Elson and William Smyth made it as far as Point Barrow and the settlement of Nuvuk. By the early 1850s the residents of Nuvuk were aware of other European and American ships, and in some cases may have seen them while traveling, but the next ship to actually reach Point Barrow seems to have been HMS Plover under the command of Rochfort Maguire. Plover overwintered in 1852 and 1853 in Elson Lagoon, adjacent to the village of Nuvuk. The village residents and the crew interacted quite a bit and Maguire recorded a considerable amount of information on the community.

=== Scientific investigations ===
The earliest primarily scientific expedition to north Alaska was the United States Army Signal Corps expedition under Lieutenant Patrick Henry Ray. In 1881 the expedition established a station at Cape Smythe for the 1st International Polar Year (IPY). Although the expedition was primarily to collect meteorological and magnetic data, it produced one of the most important references for pre-and post-contact north Alaskan archaeology. The expedition purchased a large collection of Iñupiat material culture from the residents of Nuvuk and Utqiagvik (Barrow). Expedition member John Murdoch recorded ethnographic information and wrote a volume covering that as well as an exhaustive description of the material culture collected by the expedition.

Vilhjalmur Stefansson, came to the Barrow area in 1912 and spent some time with Charles Brower. He purchased many artifacts excavated by local residents, including from Nuvuk and Birnirk, which later were reported in several work.

James A. Ford began his archaeological work on the North Slope in 1931. He had a full field season in 1932, working between Nuvuk and Walakpa, although his excavations at Nuvuk were quite limited.

In 1951, Wilbert Carter began the first of three seasons of excavations at Piġniq (Birnirk) and Nuvuk. The crew staged out of the Naval Arctic Research Laboratory (NARL), worked at Nuvuk (which at the time was actually on an island, since the Point Barrow spit was breached) until seasonal ice melt impeded access, then shifted operations to Piġniq for the rest of the season. Over the three seasons, several cuts were excavated at Nuvuk. The material has yet to be published to any great extent. There are several preliminary reports and a so-called Final Report which remain unpublished.

==== Nuvuk Archaeological Project ====
The Nuvuk Archaeology Project (NAP) started after the repeated finding of eroding graves. The main focus of the NAP was the excavation of a cemetery that was discovered eroding at Nuvuk. Over 90 burials have been excavated from the eroding spit. They range in age from at least the Early to Late Western Thule cultures. Bayesian chronological modeling suggests that Northern Maritime occupation may have begun as early as 530–650 cal AD. These people are considered to be ancestors by the Iñupiat residents of Barrow, a point of view supported by genetic data.

Researchers recorded the remnants of two Ipiutak structures which repent the first evidence of the Ipiutak north of Point Hope. They were located beneath the Thule and Iñupiat occupations, which were already known at Nuvuk. Nearly 3 ft 3 in (1 m) of sterile gravel separated these structures from more recent occupation evidence; the beach ridge and sea level were much lower in Ipiutak times. One of the two loci suggested a catastrophic termination of the occupation by a storm surge, based on a strandline deposit which cut across the archaeological deposit. This material is dated to 300–400 cal AD, an early date for Ipiutak cultural material. Both loci were completely eroded within two months of their discovery.

Another feature is a whaling captain's work area likely from the 1870s or 80s, based on the combination of Euroamerican and traditional whaling gear. It was first exposed during geomorphological work on the erosion face in 2006 and was completely eroded within two years, before which only portions had been excavated. It is the only such feature on the Alaska North Slope to have been extensively excavated.
