= Erik Holtved =

Danish artist, archaeologist, linguist, and ethnologist

- Born: June 21, 1899; Frederica, Denmark
- Died: May 24, 1981 (aged 81); Copenhagen, Denmark
- Occupations: Artist, archaeologist, linguist, and ethnologist
- Known for: First university-trained ethnologist to study the Inughuit
- Partner: Joko Holtved

Academic background
- Education: University of Copenhagen

Academic work
- Main interests: Thule culture, Eskimo folklore

Dr. Erik Holtved (Greenlandic nickname: Erissuaq; translation: "Big Eric") (21 June 1899 – 1981) was a Danish artist, archaeologist, linguist, and ethnologist. He was the first university-trained ethnologist to study the Inughuit, the northernmost Greenlandic Inuit.

== Career ==
Holtved was born in Fredericia, Denmark in 1899.

An artist early on, in 1931, he was selected by Knud Rasmussen to head the Sixth Thule Expedition to Greenland which changed the course of his life. His field trips to Greenland continued in 1932, 1933, 1934, 1935–1937, and 1946–1947. He received his master's degree (1941) and doctorate (1944) at the University of Copenhagen.

As an archaeologist, he researched Eskimo archaeology in the Julianehaab district, Disko Bay, and Inglefield Land. In 1931, he did work in the Lindenows Fjord area of southern Greenland, excavating 25 houses and unearthing 2,000 artifacts. In the 1930s, he was the first to identify the Ruin Island Phase of the Thule culture in northwest Greenland. He excavated the Comer's Midden site from 1935 to 1937, and again from 1946 to 1947. He surveyed the Greenland coast from Humboldt Glacier to Thule.

As a linguist, Holtved participated in the study of Eskimo–Aleut phonetic notation with William Thalbitzer and Knut Bergsland. Regarding Eskimo folklore, he published several scholarly works, including, The Eskimo Myth about the Sea-woman, The Eskimo legend of Navaranâq, Myths and tales translated, and The Polar Eskimos: Language and Folklore which included song texts.

In Eskimokunst : Eskimo art he surveyed Eskimo art, including items such as dolls, Tupilaqs, containers, garments, and maps.

Upon Thalbitzer's retirement, Holtved became Professor of Eskimology at the University of Copenhagen.

== Later years ==
He lived for a time at 14 Hauser Plads, Copenhagen, Denmark. After retiring from the university, Holtved painted again. He died in Copenhagen on 24 May 1981.

== Partial works ==
- (1914). Archaeological investigations in the Thule district
- (1900s). Mackenzie eskimo ordliste efter Petito
- (1936). The eskimo archaeology of Julianehaab District
- (1943). The Eskimo legend of Navaranâq
- (1947). Eskimokunst: Eskimo art
- (1951). The Polar Eskimos, language and folklore 2, Myths and tales translated
- (1952). "Remarks on the Polar Eskimo dialect", International Journal of American Linguistics
- (1962). Eskimo shamanism
- (1962). Otto Fabricius' Ethnographical works
- (1963). Tornarssuk, an Eskimo Deity
- (1967). "Contributions to Polar Eskimo ethnography". Meddelelser om Grønland
