= Point Barrow =

Point Barrow Nuvuk (Inupiaq)
- Northernmost point of the United States
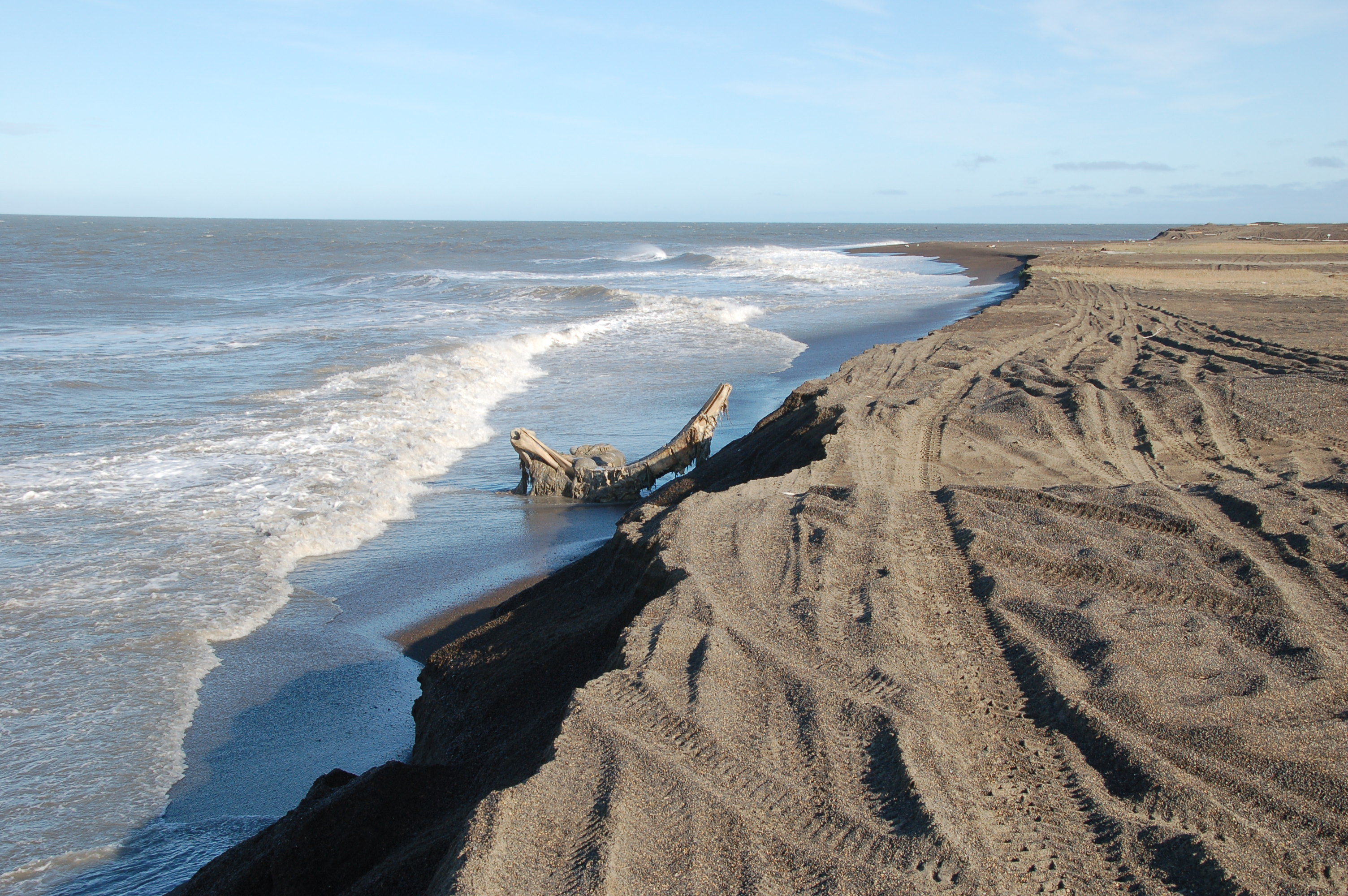

- Location within the state of Alaska
- Coordinates: 71°23′20″N 156°28′45″W
- Country: United States
- State: Alaska
- Borough: North Slope
- Time zone: UTC-9 (AKST)
  - Summer (DST): UTC-8 (AKDT)

Point Barrow or Nuvuk is a headland on the Arctic coast in the U.S. state of Alaska, 9 miles (14 km) northeast of Utqiagvik (formerly Barrow). It is the northernmost point of all the territory of the United States, at 71°23′20″N 156°28′45″W, 1,122 nautical miles (1,291 mi; 2,078 km) south of the North Pole. (The northernmost point on the North American mainland, Murchison Promontory in Canada, is 40 miles (64 km) farther north.)

== Geography ==
Point Barrow is an important geographical landmark, marking the limit between two marginal seas of the Arctic Ocean, the Chukchi Sea to the west and the Beaufort Sea to the east.

== History ==
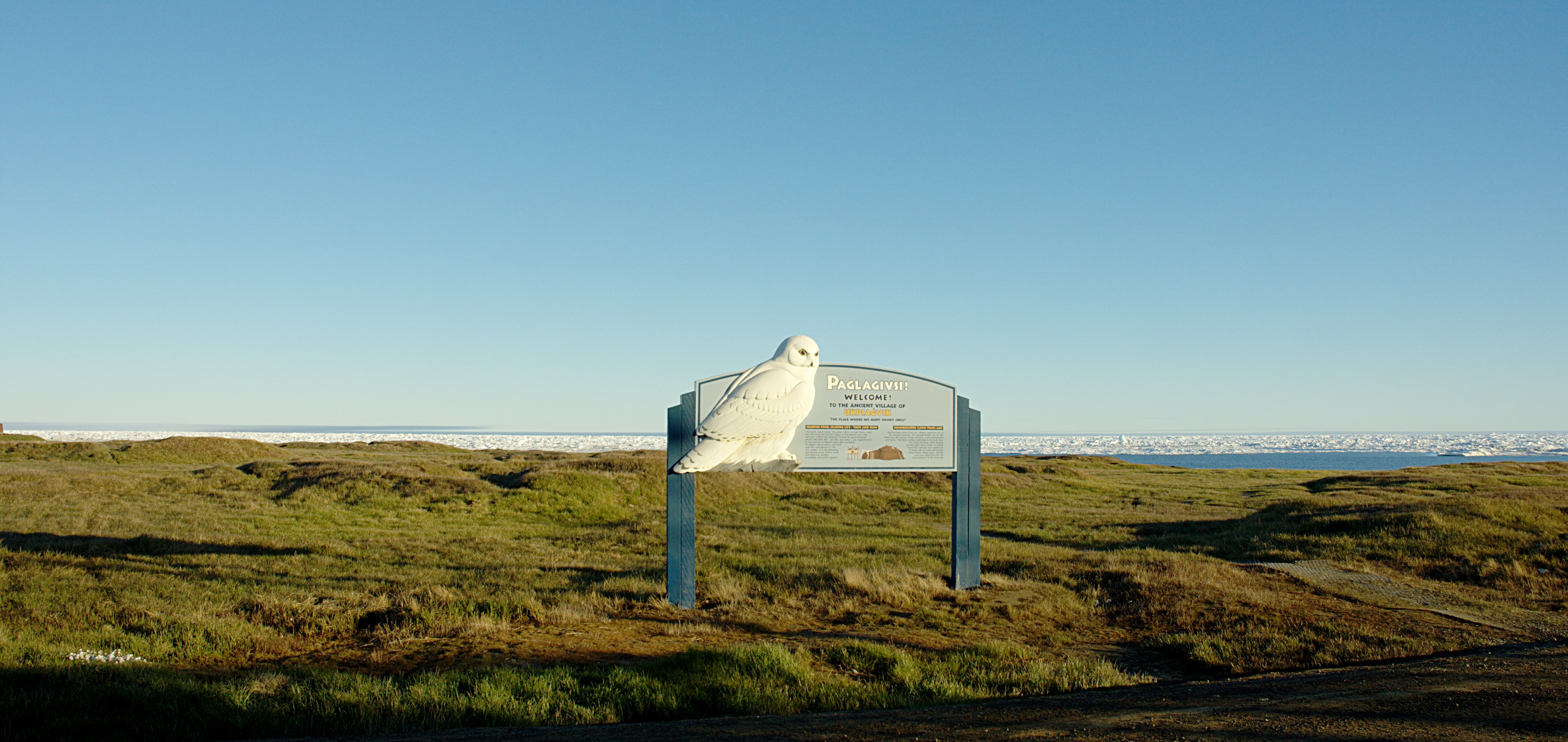
Ukpeagvik mounds

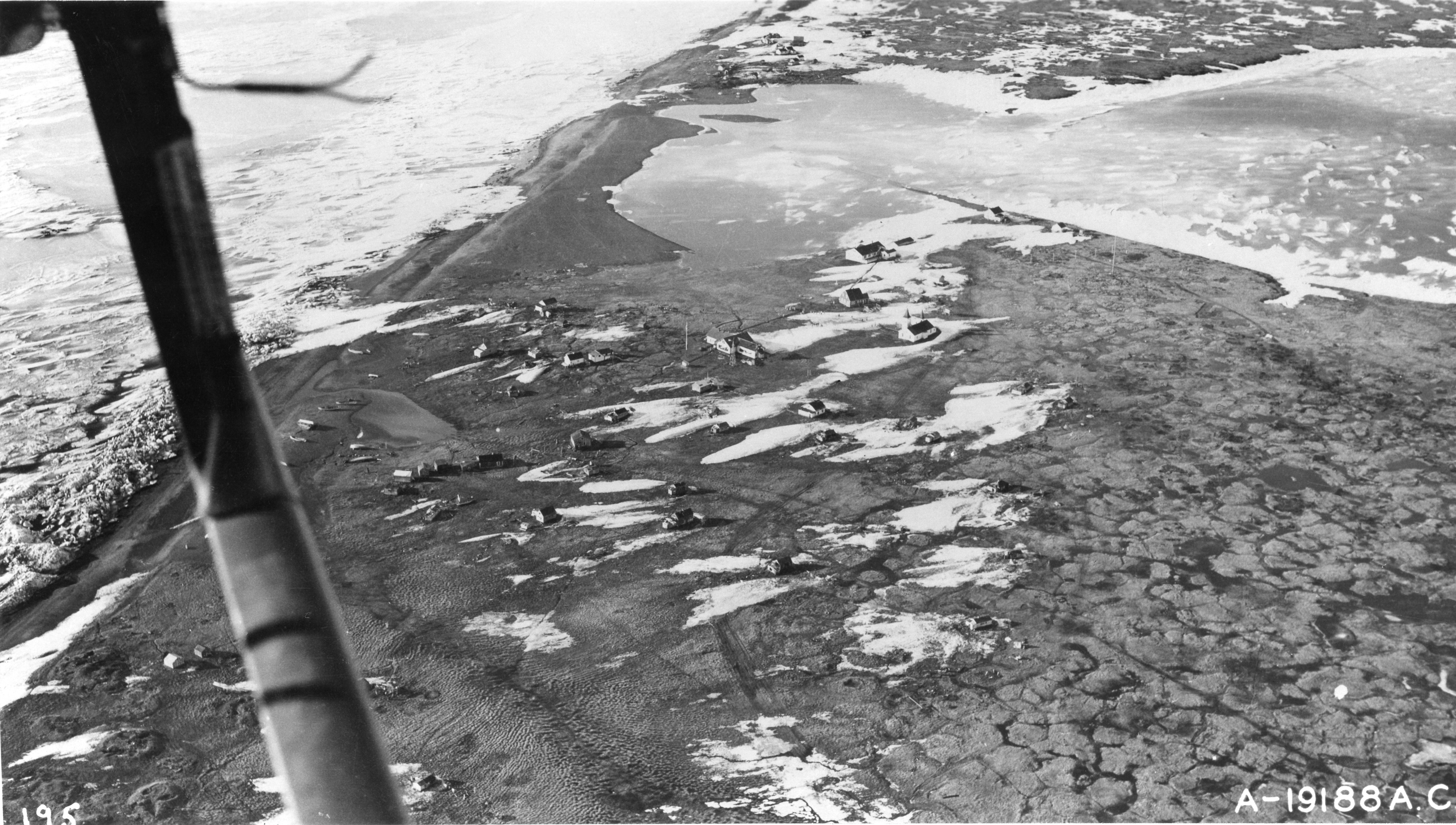
Point Barrow in the 1940s

Archaeological evidence indicates that Point Barrow was occupied by the ancestors of the Iñupiat for almost 1,000 years prior to the arrival of the first Europeans. Occupation continued into the 1940s. The headland is an important archaeological site, yielding burials and artifacts associated with the Thule culture, including uluit and bola. The waters off Point Barrow are on the bowhead whale migration route and it is surmised, that the site was chosen to make hunting easier. There are also burial mounds in the area, at the nearby Birnirk site, associated with the earlier Birnirk culture, a pre-Thule culture first identified in 1912 by Vilhjalmur Stefansson while excavating in the area. The settlement was called Nuvuk, and it was near the "migration path of bowhead whales which would become the cultural and nutritional centre of Nuvuk life."

Point Barrow was named in 1826 by English explorer Frederick William Beechey for Sir John Barrow, a statesman and geographer of the British Admiralty. The water around it is normally ice-free for two or three months a year, but this was not the experience of the early explorers. Beechey could not reach it by ship and had to send a ship's boat ahead.

In 1826, John Franklin tried to reach it from the east, but was blocked by ice.

In 1837, Thomas Simpson walked 50 miles west to Point Barrow after his boats were stopped by ice.

In 1849, William Pullen rounded it in two whale boats after sending two larger boats back west because of the ice.

During the winter of 1897–1898, the Overland Relief Expedition took place to rescue 265 whalers trapped near Point Barrow.

Point Barrow has been a jumping-off point for many Arctic expeditions, including the 1926 Wilkins Detroit Arctic Expedition and the April 15, 1928, Eielson–Wilkins flight across the Arctic Ocean to Spitsbergen.

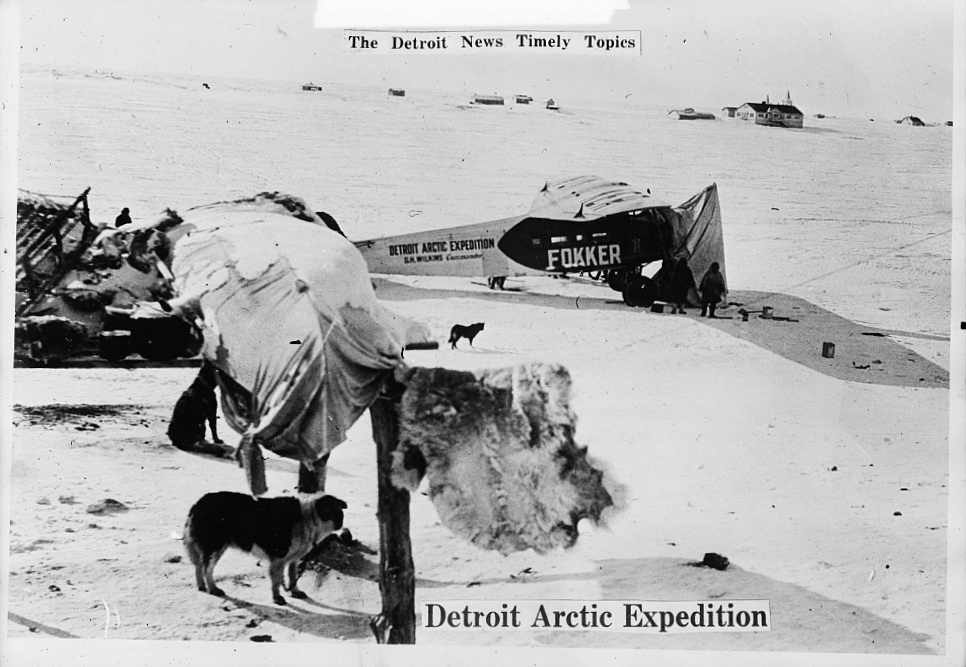
Wilkins-Detroit Arctic Expedition

On August 15, 1935, an airplane crash killed aviator Wiley Post and his passenger, the entertainer Will Rogers, at the Rogers–Post Site, 33 km (20.5 mi) southwest of Point Barrow.

In 1946, William C. Trimble of the State Department discussed an alternate offer of land in Point Barrow, as part of a $100 million in gold bullion offer to Denmark to purchase Greenland. Had the Alaska trade occurred, from 1967 Denmark would have benefited from Prudhoe Bay Oil Field, the richest petroleum discovery in American history.

In 1988, gray whales were trapped in the ice at Point Barrow, which attracted attention from the public worldwide. The Iñupiat do not hunt gray whales and joined in rescue operation Operation Breakthrough, which also involved Soviet icebreakers.

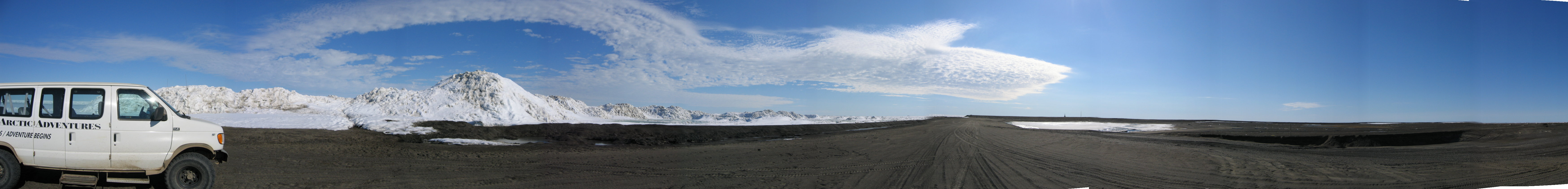
Nuvuk (Point Barrow)

== Demographics ==
Historical population
Census	Pop.	Note	%±
1880	200		—
1890	152		−24.0%
1910	127		—
1920	91		−28.3%
1930	82		−9.9%
1940	28		−65.9%
U.S. Decennial Census

Point Barrow first appeared in the 1880 U.S. census as the unincorporated Inuit village of "Kokmullit" (AKA Nuwuk). All 200 residents were Inuit. In 1890, it returned as Point Barrow, which also included the Refuge & Whaling Station and native settlements of Nuwuk, Ongovehenok and winter village on "Kugaru" (Inaru) River. It reported 152 residents, of which 143 were Native American, eight were "other race" and one was white. It did not report in 1900, but appeared again from 1910-1940. It has not reported separately since.

The nearby city of about 5,000 people used the name Barrow from 1825. The city voted to change its name to Utqiagvik, its original name in the Inupiaq language, on December 1, 2016.

== See also ==
- Alaska North Slope
- Iḷisaġvik College
- Umiak
