= Point Barrow Long Range Radar Site =

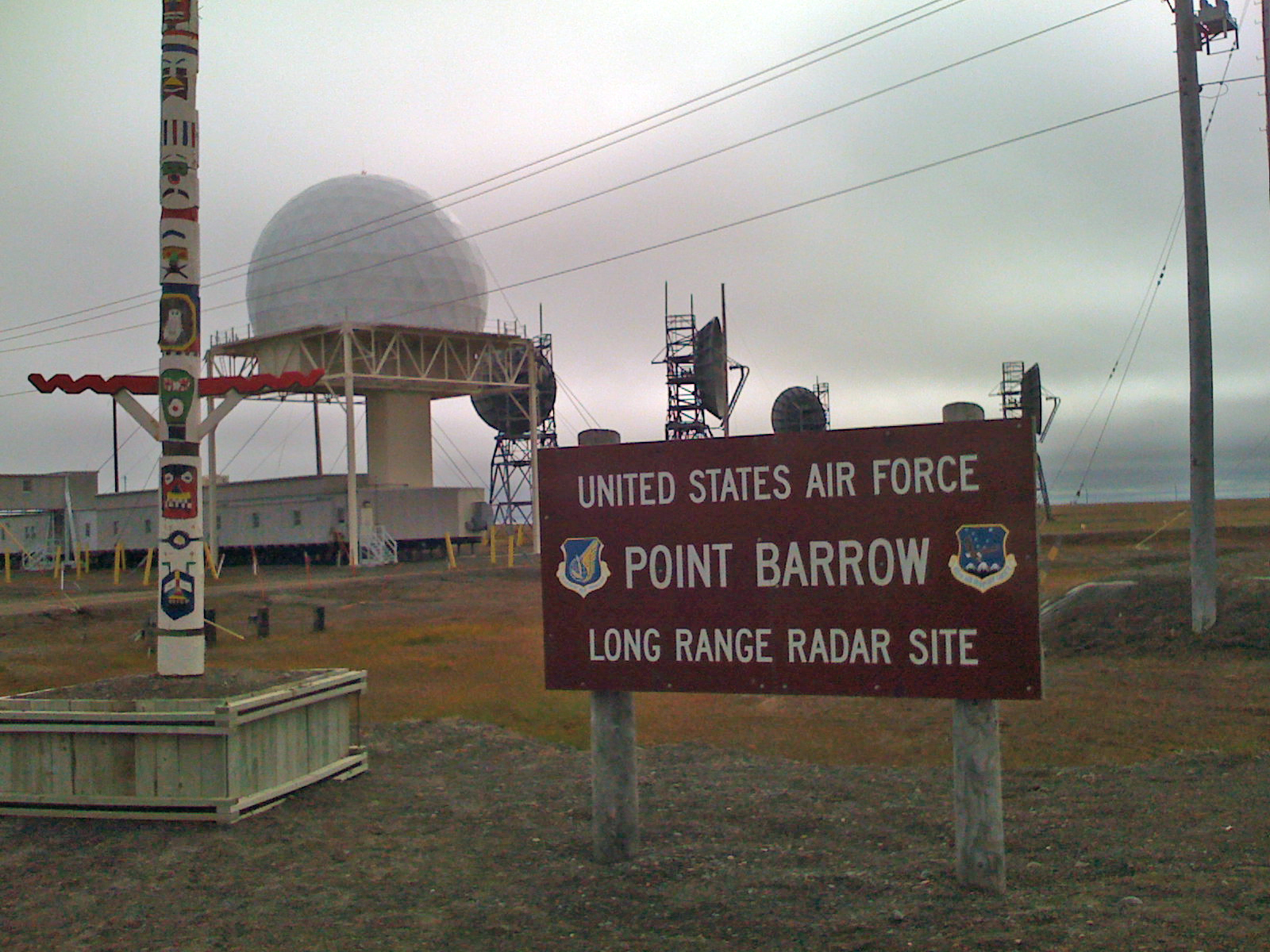
- Point Barrow station in 2008
- IATA: none; ICAO: none

Summary
- Airport type: Military
- Coordinates: 71°19′38″N 156°38′10″W

Map
- Location of Point Barrow Long Range Radar Site

Runways
Direction	Length		Surface
Direction	ft	m	Surface
04/24	4,860	1,472	Gravel

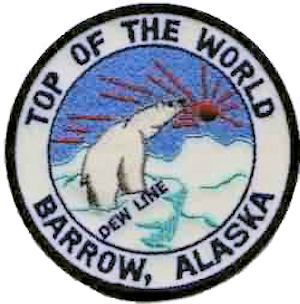
Point Barrow DEW Line patch

Point Barrow Long Range Radar Site (LRR Site: A-17) is a United States Air Force radar site and military airstrip located 5 miles (8.0 km) southwest of Point Barrow, Alaska. It is not open for public use.

== History ==
The United States military has maintained a presence at Utqiaġvik, Alaska's northernmost point, since World War II when the United States Army established a crude radar site at Point Barrow, although the chance of any Japanese attack to the area was remote. The U.S. Navy had taken over the existing civil airport and used its gravel runway to facilitate logistical support for naval assets in the Bering Straits and in and along the North Slope.

With the announcement of the Distant Early Warning Line (DEW) in 1954, Point Barrow was designed as a main site, and a military airstrip, separate from the civil airport was constructed in 1955; being used for transport aircraft and passengers to build the DEW Line stations along the northern Alaskan coast.

The Point Barrow station controlled seven staffed stations, three of them being classified as "auxiliary" sites and four as "intermediate" stations. The auxiliary stations were similar to the main site at Point Barrow; the intermediate sites had less personnel at them. The stations were made up of an AN/FPS-19 search radar, a high power L-Band radar consisting of two identical radar sets feeding a dual (back to back) antenna with a range of about 160 nautical miles. The sites had one 25-man module building for personnel who supported the radar, and an airstrip, although the length and capacity varied greatly, making frequent risky landings necessary at some sites.

Each of the sites were staffed by civilian contract workers who had signed 18-month contracts, although they were visited by Air Force military personnel frequently.

DEW ID	Site Name	Location	Activated	Inactivated	Notes
POW-MAIN; POW-M	Point Barrow	71°19′39″N 156°38′08″W	1957	Active	DEW Main site operations ended 1990; Became part of the North Warning System (NWS) with AN/FPS-117 LRR
POW-1	Port Lonely SRRS	70°54′37″N 153°14′23″W	1957	Active	DEW Auxiliary site operations ended 1990; Became part of the North Warning System (NWS) with AN/FPS-124 SRR
POW-2	Olikotk Point LRRS	70°29′54″N 149°53′22″W	1957	Active	DEW Auxiliary site operations ended 1990; Became part of the North Warning System (NWS) with AN/FPS-117 LRR
POW-3	Flaxman Island; Bullen Point SRRS	70°10′35″N 146°51′21″W	1957	2007	DEW Auxiliary site operations ended 1995; Became part of the North Warning System (NWS) with AN/FPS-124 SRR; Closed 2007 due to soil erosion and budget concerns
POW-A	Cape Simpson	71°03′26″N 154°43′56″W	1957	1963	DEW Intermediate site operations ended 1963; currently in use a civilian storage area.
POW-B	Kogru	70°34′31″N 152°16′00″W	1957	1963	DEW Intermediate site operations ended 1963; remediated about 2000 by USAF, gravel runway and graded site remains.
POW-C	Point McIntyre	70°24′10″N 148°40′47″W	1957	1963	DEW Intermediate site operations ended 1963; currently in abandoned state, old buildings and equipment remains
POW-D	Brownlow Point	69°58′27″N 144°50′15″W	1957	1963	DEW intermediate site operations ended 1963; remediated about 2000 by USAF, gravel runway and graded site remains.

With the signing of the North American Air Defence Modernization agreement at the "Shamrock Summit" between Canadian Prime Minister Brian Mulroney and U.S. President Ronald Reagan in Quebec City on 18 March 1985, the DEW Line began its eventual upgrading and transition, becoming the North Warning System (NWS) of today. The intermediate sites were closed in 1963 due to advances in radar technology. Operational NWS sites have retained their former DEW Line designations. The BAR sites are under the jurisdiction of the Alaska NORAD Region ROCC at Elmendorf AFB.

In 1998, Pacific Air Forces initiated "Operation Clean Sweep," in which abandoned Cold War stations in Alaska were remediated and the land restored to its previous state. The site remediation of the radar and support station was carried out by the 611th Civil Engineering Squadron at Elmendorf Air Force Base, and remediation work was completed by 2005.

The airport remains open to support Air Force operations around Point Barrow and to support contractor access to the military radar site.

== See also ==
- North Warning System
- Distant Early Warning Line
- Alaskan Air Command
- Eleventh Air Force
