= Ruin Island =

Uninhabited island near Greenland

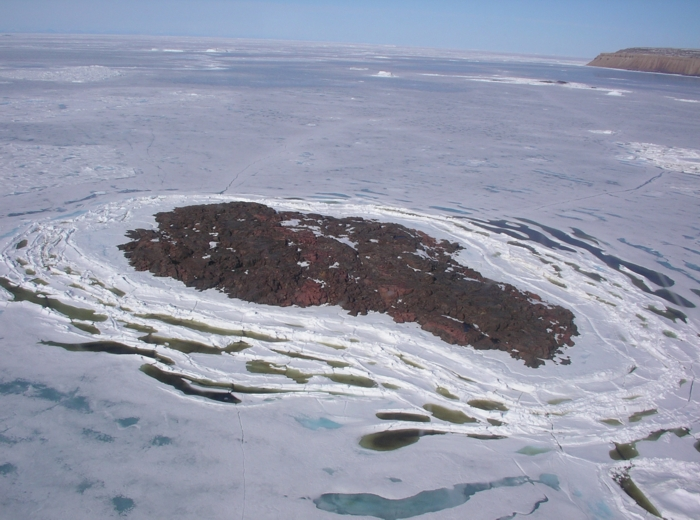
- Ruin Island with Cape Russell in Background

- Location within Greenland

Geography
- Location: Greenland
- Coordinates: 78°52.1′N 69°11.3′W

Administration
- Greenland

Ruin Island is a small island off the coast of the Inglefield Land region of northwest Greenland. In the 1930s, Danish archaeologist Erik Holtved discovered the remains of human habitation on the island. The culture associated with this archaeological site became known as the Ruin Island phase of Thule Culture. Items traded by the Greenlandic Norse travelled as far as Ruin Island.

== History ==
The earliest known inhabitants of Ruin Island are ancestors of the Inuit known as Thule culture, named after the nearby archeologic site of Thule. These Thule culture inhabitants have been estimated to arrive at Ruin Island between 1280 and 1330.
