= Bullen Point Short Range Radar Site =

- IATA: none; ICAO: PABU

Summary
- Airport type: Military
- Elevation AMSL: 18 ft / 5 m
- Coordinates: 70°10′35″N 146°51′18″W

Map
- Location of Bullen Point Short Range Radar Site

Runways
Direction	Length		Surface
Direction	ft	m	Surface
15/33	3,520	1,073	Gravel

Bullen Point Short Range Radar Site (ICAO: PABU, TC LID: 8AK7) (LRR Site: A-20) was a United States Air Force radar site and military airstrip located 240 miles (390 km) east-southeast of Point Barrow, Alaska. It is not open for public use.

== History ==
The site was built in 1957 to support the Distant Early Warning Line radar station at Point Lay (LIZ-2). The station was logistically supported by the Point Barrow Main DEW Line Station (POW-MAIN). It was operated by civilian contract workers. DEW Line operations ceased in April 1995, and the personnel were relieved from their duties.

The radar station was upgraded with new radars and in 1994 was re-designated part of the North Warning System (NWS) as a Short Range Radar Site, A-20, equipped with a minimally attended AN/FPS-124 surveillance radar. In 1998, Pacific Air Forces initiated "Operation Clean Sweep", in which abandoned Cold War stations in Alaska were remediated and the land restored to its previous state. The site remediation of the radar and support station was carried out by the 611th Civil Engineering Squadron at Elmendorf AFB, and remediation work was completed by 2005.

The site was closed in 2007 due to soil erosion and budget concerns. The support airport's status is presently undetermined.

== See also ==
- North Warning System
- Distant Early Warning Line
- Alaskan Air Command
- Eleventh Air Force
