= Therkel Mathiassen =

Danish archaeologist (1892–1967)

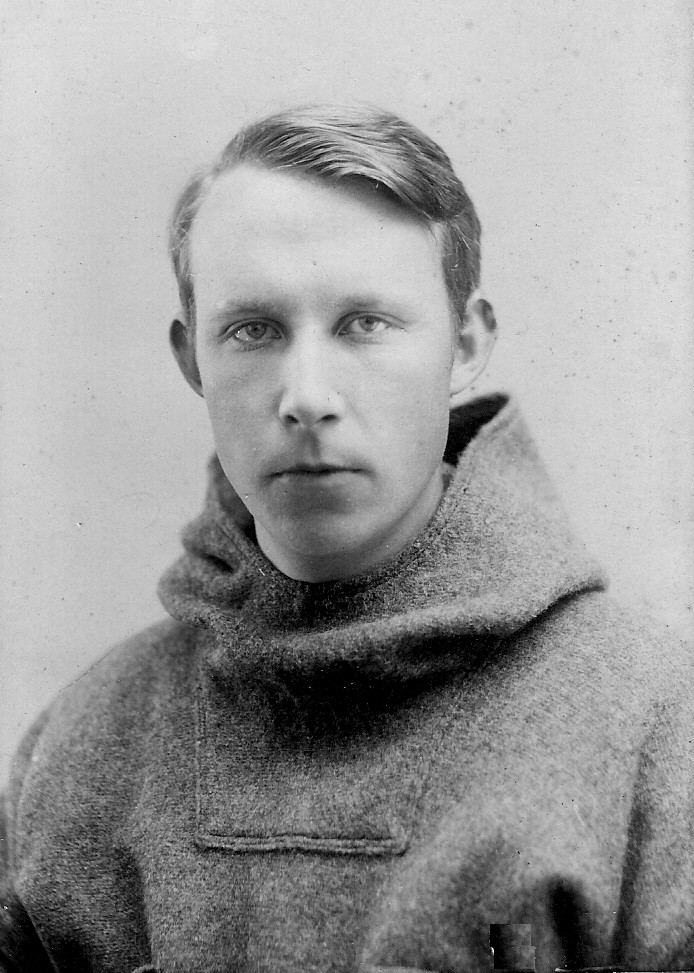
- Mathiassen, ca. 1921
- Born: 5 September 1892; Favrbo, Denmark
- Died: 14 March 1967 (aged 74)
- Citizenship: Denmark
- Known for: Thule culture excavation at "Naujan" (Naujaat)
- Awards: Member of the initial Danish committee of Societas Arctica Scandinavica
- Scientific career
- Fields: Arctic archaeology anthropology cartography ethnography writer

Therkel Mathiassen (5 September 1892, in Favrbo, Denmark – 14 March 1967) was a Danish archaeologist, anthropologist, cartographer, and ethnographer notable for his scientific study of the Arctic.

== Career ==
Mathiassen and Peter Freuchen took part in the Fifth Danish Thule Expedition led by Knud Rasmussen. During his travels, Mathiassen gave out thimbles to local Inuit, thus earning the Inuktitut nickname, Tikkilik ("the one with the thimbles"). In 1922, Mathiassen began an archaeological investigation at a site he called "Naujan" (Naujaat); the first archaeological excavation in Canada's Arctic. This was also the second ever Thule culture archaeological excavation, following the 1916 Comer's Midden in North Greenland. Mathiassen was able to manually excavate through peat, sod, and gravel, portions of 12 sod houses and a kitchen-midden.

In 1929, Mathiassen worked on another midden archaeological excavation, and uncovered a Norse culture in Inugsuk, Greenland. Frederica de Laguna was his research assistant.

Mathiassen was a member of the initial Danish committee of Societas Arctica Scandinavica, dedicated to Scandinavian research in Arctic humanistic and natural sciences. He was a prolific author of works, which have later been described as monumental and as marking the beginning of the professional period in Arctic archaeology. His works of the 1920s and 1930s introduced the concept of the Thule culture but also dismissed the theory of a Stone Age people in Greenland as first described on a scientific basis by Ole Solberg in 1907. In the 1950s, the existence of such a people was established through the use of radiocarbon dating.

== Awards ==
In 1932 he was awarded the Hans Egede Medal by the Royal Danish Geographical Society.

== Selected works ==
- Mathiassen, Therkel; Calvert, W. E.; Degerbøl, M. (1931), Ancient Eskimo settlements in the Kangamiut area, København: C.A. Reitzel, OCLC 6362780
- Mathiassen, Therkel (1930), Archæological collections from the Western Eskimos, Copenhagen: Gyldendalske Boghandel, OCLC 9618738
- — (1927), Archæology of the Central Eskimos. Report of the fifth Thule expedition, 1921-24, vol. 4, Copenhagen: Gyldendal, OCLC 3932052
- — (1934), Contributions to the archaeology of Disko Bay, København: C.A. Reitzel, OCLC 1625835
- — Freuchen, P. (1933), Contributions to the geography of Baffin Land and Melville Peninsula, Copenhagen: Gyldendalske Boghandel, OCLC 9618165
- — (1931), Contributions to the physiography of Southampton Island, Copenhagen: Gyldendalske Boghandel, OCLC 9618113
- — (1934), Eskimo finds from the Kangerdlugssuaq region, København: C.A. Reitzel, OCLC 6335533
- — Calvert, W. E. (1928), Material culture of the Iglulik Eskimos, Copenhagen: Gyldendal, OCLC 2304433
- — (1933), Prehistory of the Angmagssalik Eskimos, København: C.A. Reitzel, OCLC 6365385
- — (1945), Report on the expedition, Copenhagen: Gyldendalske Boghandel, OCLC 9618080
- — Holtved, E.; Calvert, W. E. (1936), The Eskimo archaeology of Julianehaab district, with a brief summary of the prehistory of the Greenlanders, København: C.A. Reitzel, OCLC 1156849
- — (1936), The former Eskimo settlements on Frederik VI's coast, OCLC 1158412
- — (1958), The Sermermiut Excavations, 1955, København: C.A. Reitzel, OCLC 4679506
- — (1927), The Thule culture and its position within the Eskimo culture. Archæology of the Central Eskimos II, Copenhagen: Gyldendal, OCLC 23618710

== Sources ==
- Collins, Jr., Henry B. (January–March 1946), "Anthropology during the War. II. Scandinavia", American Anthropologist, 48 (1): 141–144, doi:10.1525/aa.1946.48.1.02a00340, JSTOR 662818.
- Folger, Mosha (2004-08-06). "Digging for history in Naujaat". Nunatsiaq News'. Archived from the original on 2004-12-30.
- Grønnow, Bjarne (1996), "Brudstykker af Baade og forarbeidede Steensager — Arktisk arkæologi", in Thisted, Kirsten (ed.), Grønlandsforskning, historie og perspektiver (in Danish), Det Grønlandske Selskab, ISBN 87-87925-38-9
- Mathiassen, Therkel (October 1930), "An Old Eskimo Culture in West Greenland: Report of an Archeological Expedition to Upernivik", Geographical Review, 20 (4), Geographical Review, Vol. 20, No. 4: 605–614, doi:10.2307/209014, JSTOR 209014.
- Meldgaard, Jørgen (1996), "The Pioneers: The Beginnings of Paleo-Eskimo Research in West Greenland", in Grønnow, Bjarne; Pind, John (eds.), The Paleo-Eskimo Cultures of Greenland — New Perspectives in Greenlandic Archaeology, Copenhagen: Danish Polar Center, ISBN 87-90369-02-5
- Rasmussen, K. (1927), Across Arctic America; narrative of the Fifth Thule expedition, New York: G.P. Putnam's Sons, OCLC 1887987
