= Old Bering Sea =

Archaeological culture

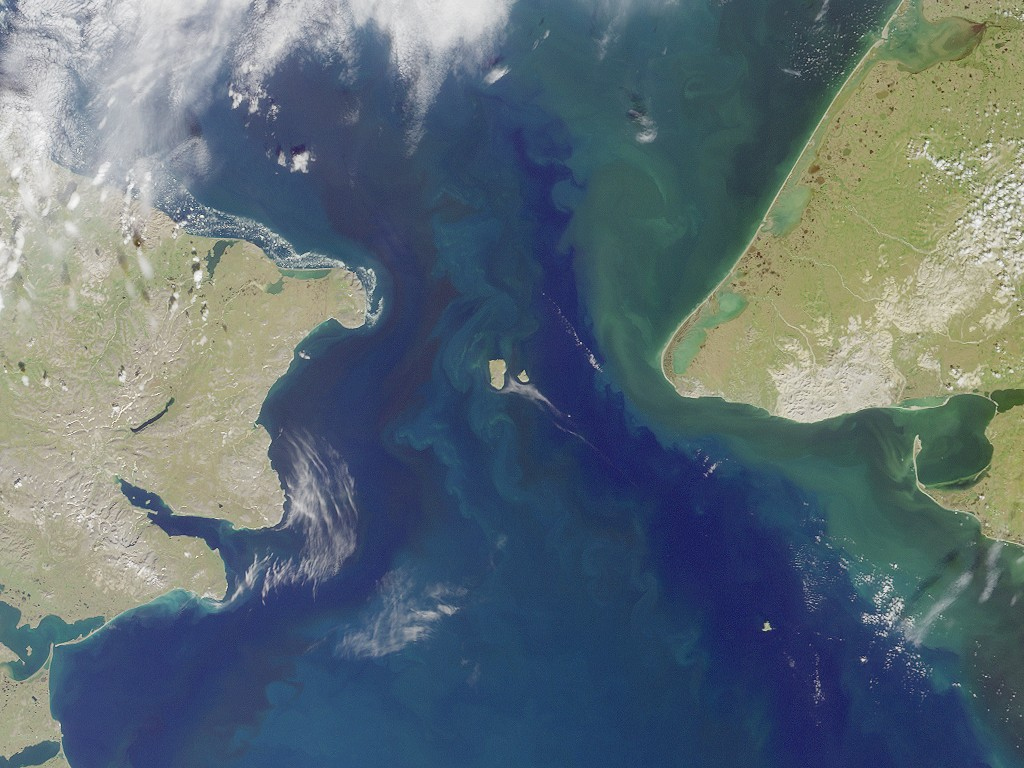
Satellite image of Bering Strait. Cape Dezhnev, Russia, is on the left, the two Diomede Islands are in the middle, and Cape Prince of Wales, Alaska, is on the right.

Old Bering Sea is an archaeological culture associated with a distinctive, elaborate circle and dot aesthetic style and centered on the Bering Strait region; no site is more than 1 km from the ocean. Old Bering Sea is considered, following Henry B. Collins, the initial phase of the Northern Maritime tradition. Despite its name, several OBS sites lie on the Chukchi Sea. The temporal range of the culture is from 400 BC to possibly as late as 1300 AD. Another suggested range is from about 200 BC to 500 AD.

== Discovery ==
The culture was initially named the "Bering Sea" culture by Canadian archaeologist Diamond Jenness in 1928 following the discovery on the Diomede Islands of distinctively decorated objects such as whaling and sealing harpoon heads. The adjective "Old" was added by Smithsonian archaeologist Henry B. Collins to distinguish the culture from younger materials with similar design elements. Subsequent discoveries from 1925 to 1940 occurred within archaeological excavations mostly on St. Lawrence Island, and is renowned for its richly carved winged objects, employed as counterweights on atlatls (spear-throwing lever).

== Artifacts ==
The richly decorated objects are nearly exclusively on walrus tusk, some with distinctive color and antiquity; the decorations were applied to a very wide range of objects, many of which are recovered only in graves, some of which contain dozens of objects.

=== Image gallery ===
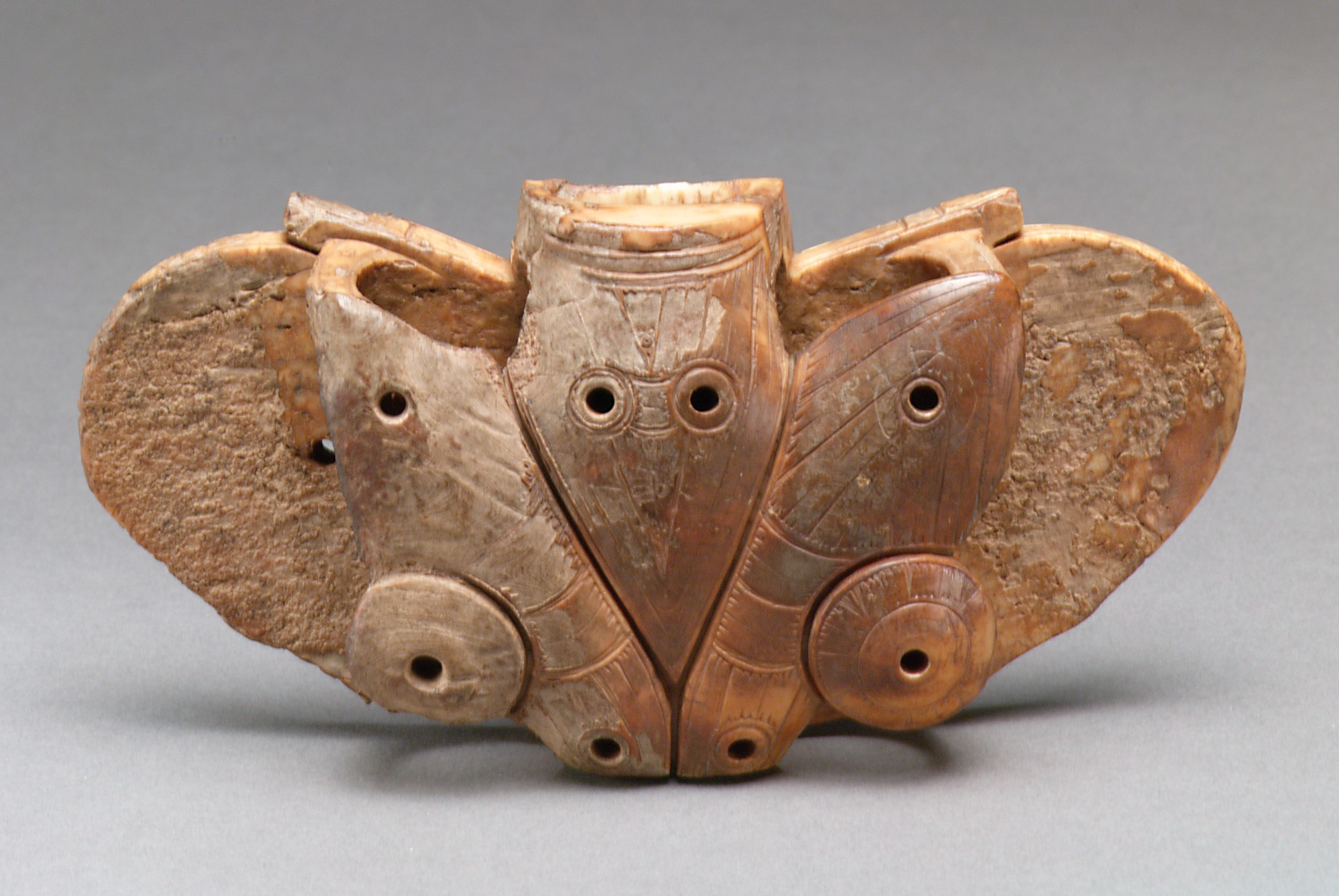
Winged object (harpoon counterweight?); 2nd–3rd century; ivory (walrus); Metropolitan Museum of Art (New York City)

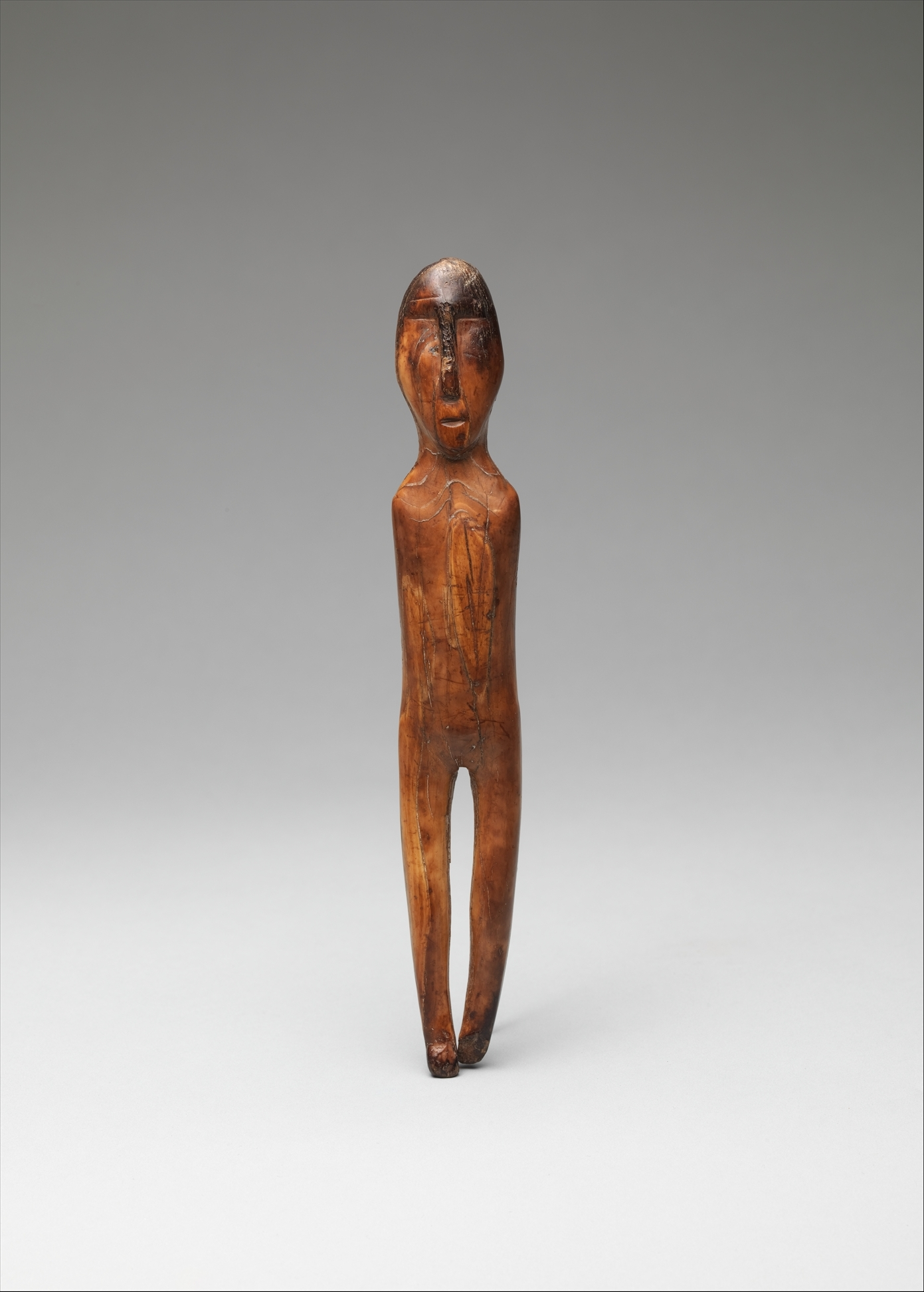
Standing figure; 2nd century BC-1st century AD; ivory (walrus); height: 22.5 cm (8 7/8in.); Metropolitan Museum of Art

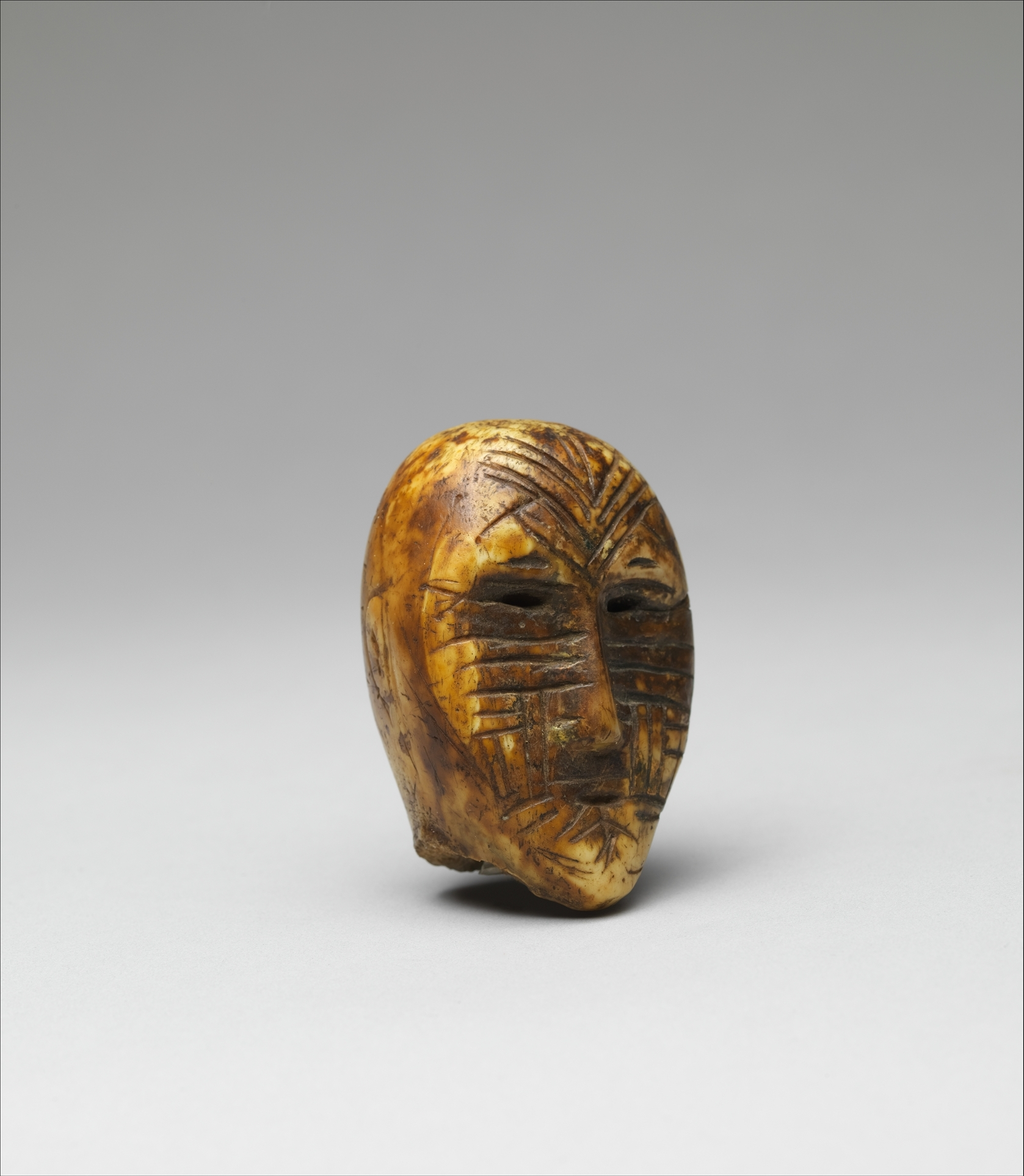
Head; 2nd–4th century; ivory (walrus); height: 6.35 cm (2 1/2 in.); Metropolitan Museum of Art

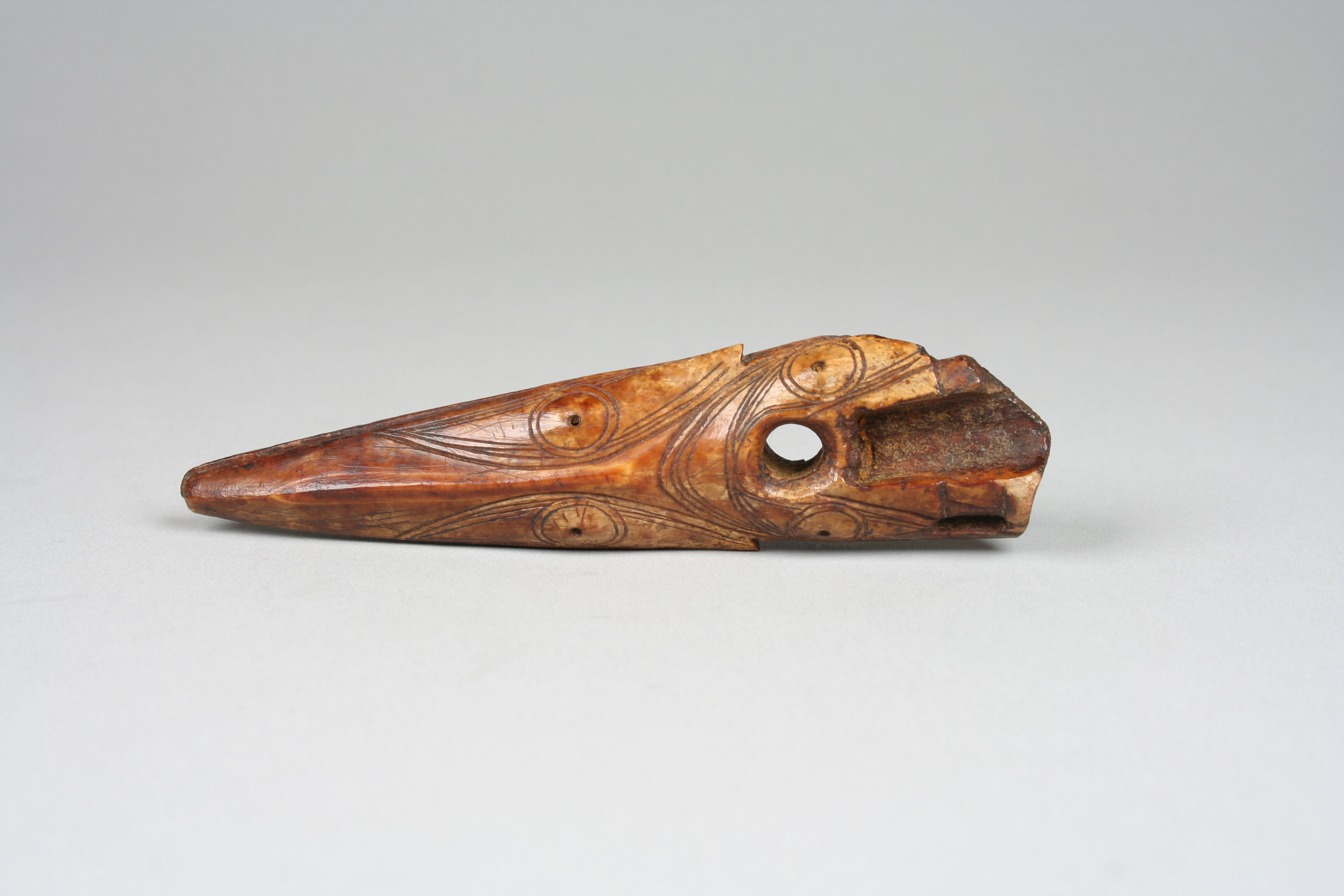
Harpoon head; 2nd–3rd century; ivory (walrus); height: 2.5 cm (1 in.); Metropolitan Museum of Art

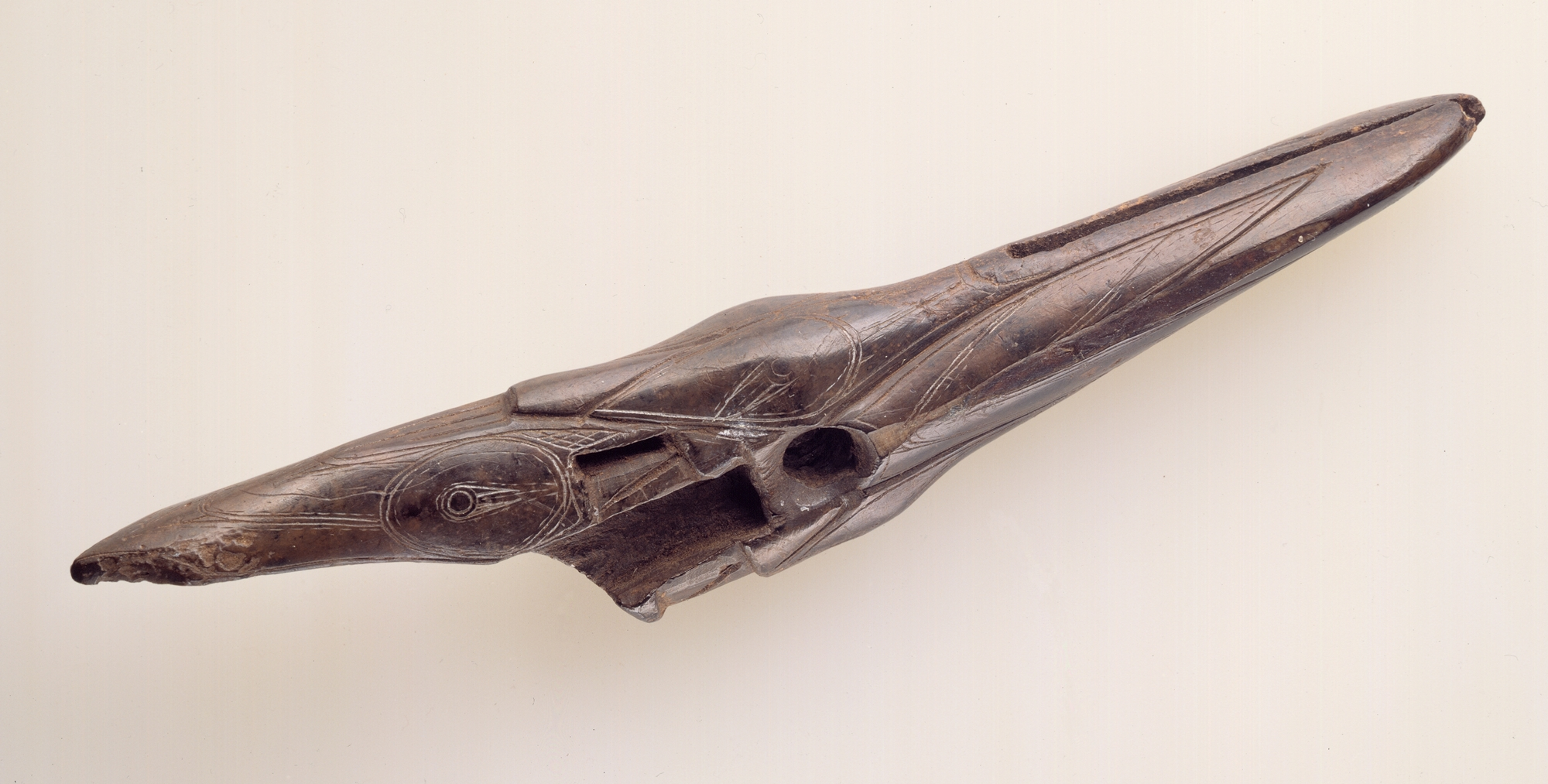
Harpoon head; 4th–5th century; ivory (walrus); Metropolitan Museum of Art

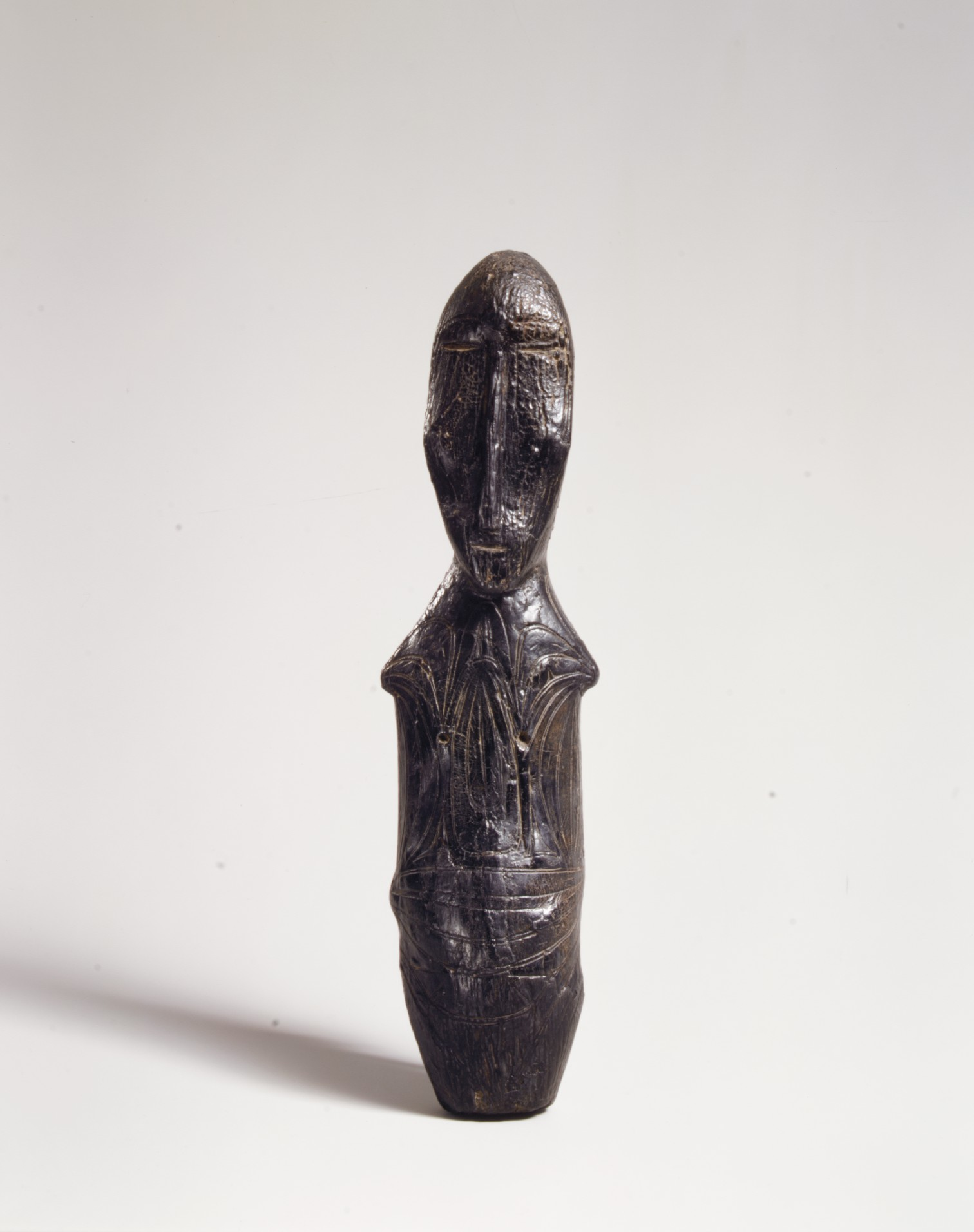
Female figure; 2nd century BC-1st century AD; ivory (walrus); height: 18.4 cm (7 1/4 in.); Metropolitan Museum of Art

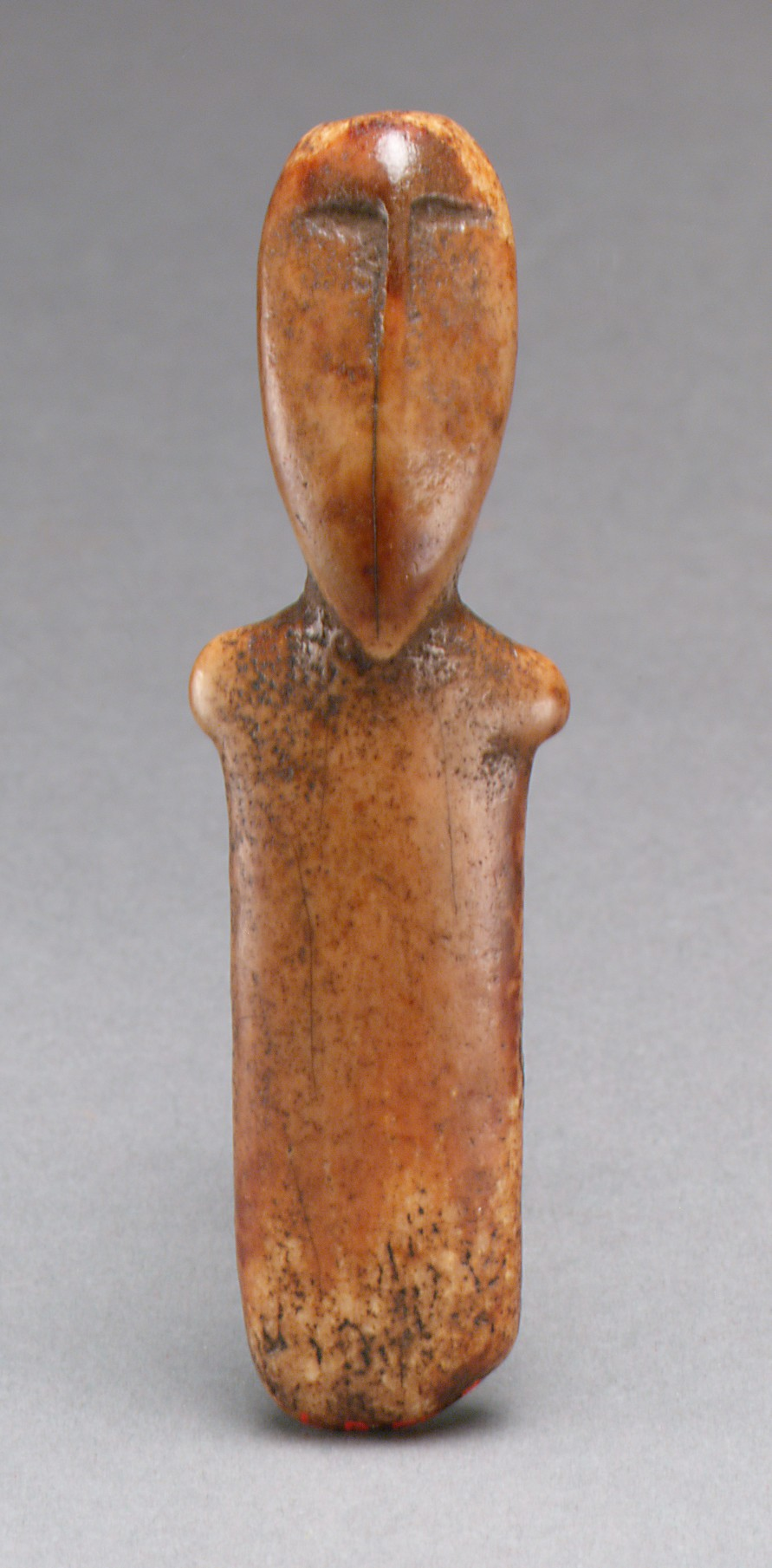
Figure: 150 BC-100 AD; ivory (walrus); height: 9.4 cm (3 3/4 in.); Metropolitan Museum of Art

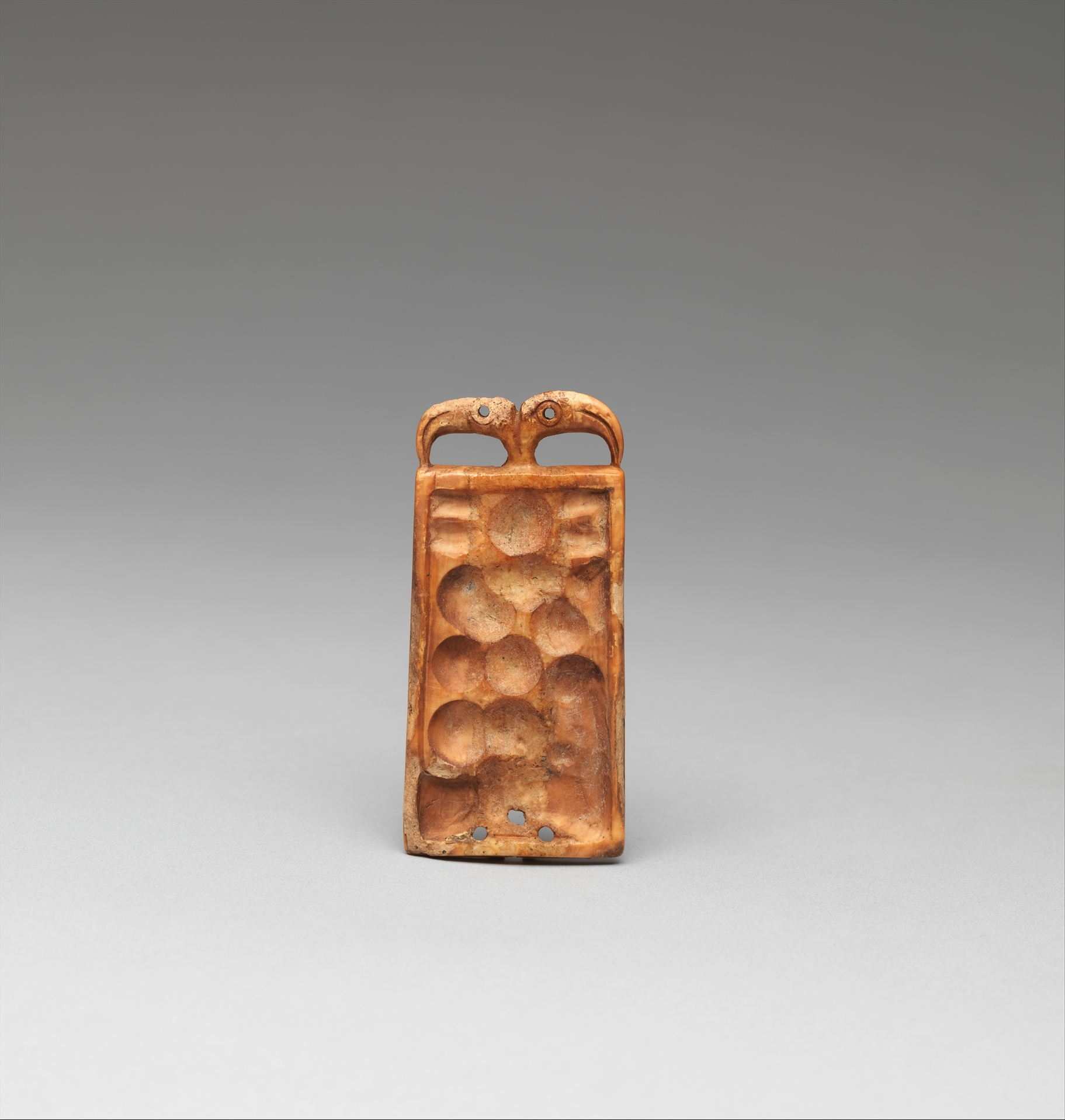
Ornament; 4th century; ivory (walrus); height: 6.4 (2 1/2 in.); Metropolitan Museum of Art

== Location and distribution ==
Old Bering Sea people lived along the coasts of the Bering Strait, in what are now Alaska and Chukotka in northeastern Russia. Their communities were concentrated on Sivuqaq (St. Lawrence Island), the Diomede Islands, and the nearby Chukotkan coast. Sivuqaq was a major centre of the culture, and numerous Old Bering Sea sites have been identified around its coastline. No known Old Bering Sea site lies more than 1 kilometre (0.62 mi) from the ocean.

The highest concentration of known graves, more than 500, has been found near Cape Dezhnev at the sites of Uelen and Ekven, located north and south of the cape respectively. Old Bering Sea sites are common around the coasts of Sivuqaq and on the Diomede Islands. By contrast, only isolated finds have been identified on the North American mainland, including at Barrow, Point Hope, Cape Espenberg, and Golovnin Bay in eastern Norton Sound.

== Phases of development ==
Several phases of the linear and circle and dot Old Bering Sea style was formally defined by Henry Collins in 1937 on the basis of his extensive excavations at the mound sites of Mayughaaq in the vicinity of Gambell, Alaska, at the northwestern cape of St. Lawrence Island. Collins' research focused on large midden and domestic architecture with few graves located; a large cemetery was subsequently located nearby by Hans Georg Bandi in the 1960s. An important subdivision of Old Bering Sea is its earliest, more spare designs termed Okvik, for several mounds on an island off the east coast of St. Lawrence Island, excavated by Otto Geist. A small Okvik site, the Hillside locality, lies above the Mayughaaq mound and contains five stone slab houses reasonably well dated to 200 to 400 AD.

== Excavation sites ==
The sites containing Old Bering Sea objects are typically large mounds and middens or cemeteries with hundreds of graves, often framed by bowhead whale mandibles and floored with wooden planks, hewn out of driftwood. Very few graves contain elaborate grave offerings; sufficiently few for some archaeologists to infer the existence of hierarchical groups, including powerful whaling captains and/or shamans, some of whom were women.

== Origins ==
The origins of Old Bering Sea remain poorly known, although its chronology can be tentatively established from several localities across Bering Strait, especially the Ekven cemetery in Chukotka. The earliest materials termed OBS may be dated ca. 200 BC from mortuary remains at Ekven. The peak of the culture was between AD 400 and 900, as established from calibrated ages at both Mayughaaq and Ekven, indicating that its age is younger than previously believed. The OBS culture is believed to have developed into the Punuk culture in Siberia and to the Birnirk culture in north Alaska. The Old Bering Sea culture is also considered the earliest indication of the Thule culture.

A 2019 genetic analysis concluded that between 2,700 and 4,900 years ago, the ancestors of the Thule emerged in Alaska through admixture between the Paleo-Eskimo and the Ocean Bay Tradition and that these ancestors subsequently migrated back to Siberia where they became the Old Bering Sea, only to eventually return to Alaska.
