= Comer's Midden =

Archaeological excavation site in Greenland

Coordinates: 76°34′N 68°50′W

- Created: Thule culture
- Discovered: 1916
- Present location: Uummannaq or Dundas, Thule, Greenland

Location within Greenland

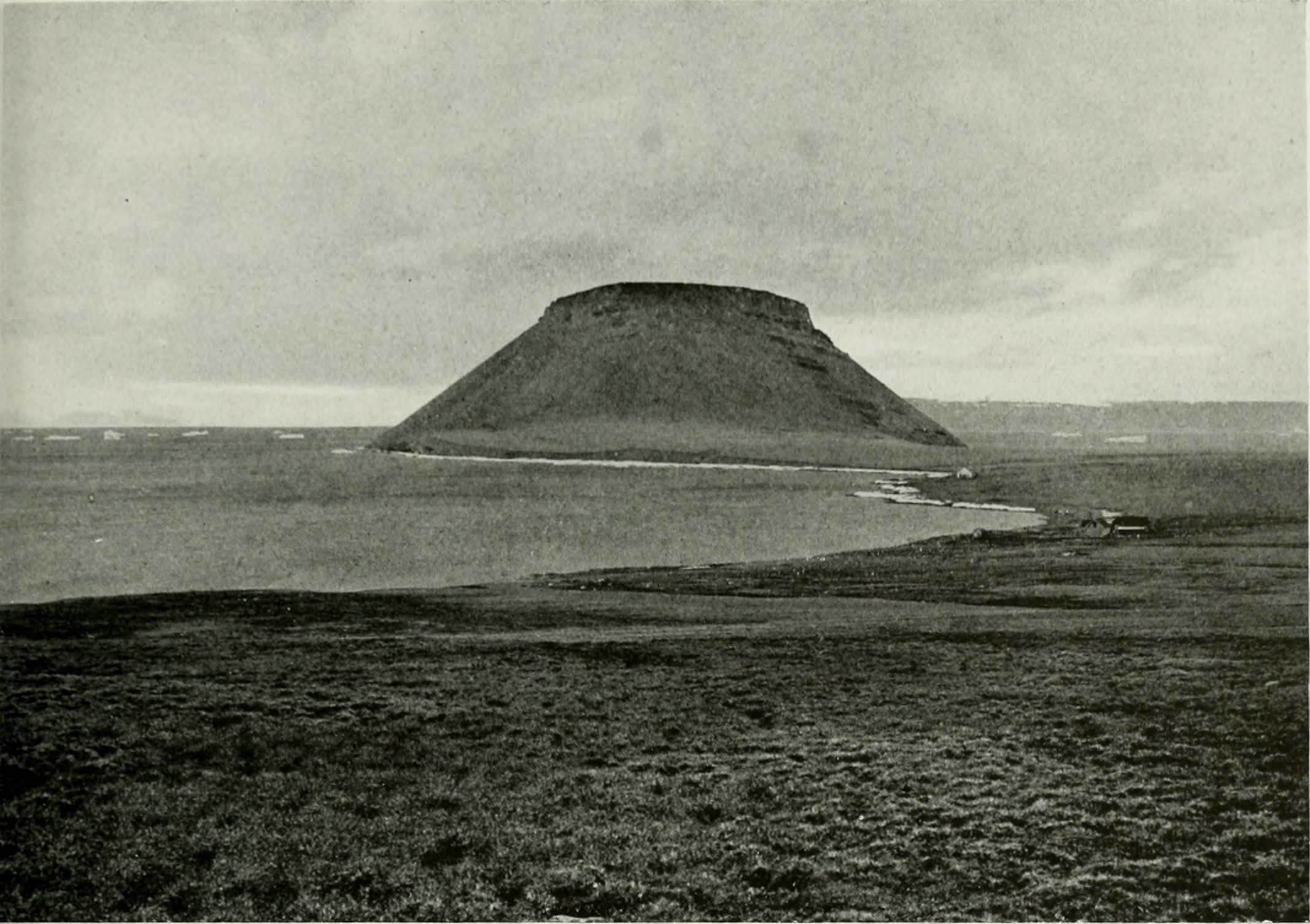
The flat land of Uummannaq, leading to Mt. Dundas, photographed by Edmund Otis Hovey in 1916 or 1917

Comer's Midden was a 1916 archaeological excavation site at Uummannaq, known as Dundas in English, north of Mt. Dundas in the Thule area of North Star Bay, in northern Greenland. It is the find after which the Thule culture was named. The site was first excavated in 1916 by whaling Captain George Comer, ice master of the Crocker Land Expedition's relief team, and of members of Knud Rasmussen's Second Danish Thule Expedition who were in the area charting the North Greenland coast.

== Excavation phases ==
=== First ===
With his ship ice-bound, Comer made use of his time through an archaeological excavation just south of Arctic Station of Thule unearthing, amongst other things, a kitchen-midden made by paleo-Eskimos. The site is named in honor of Comer and the midden that he found.

=== Subsequent ===
Anthropologist Therkel Mathiassen accompanied Rasmussen's 5th Thule Expedition (1921–1924) that included a return to the Thule site. In Mathiasen's monumental works of the 1920s and 1930s, he described Comer's Midden as "the only substantial find of pure Thule culture in Greenland".

The site was excavated by Erik Holtved in 1935 to 1937, and again in 1946 to 1947.

== Archaeological finds ==
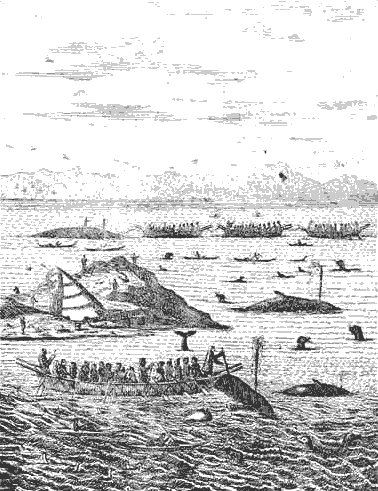
Thule Greenlanders whaling, drawing by Hans Egede, 18th century

=== Habitation periods ===
The site shows signs of having been inhabited from the 14th to the 20th century although Holtved reports that the 17th and 18th centuries are poorly represented.

=== Ruins ===
The site contains about 26 house ruins and several middens distributed over an area of about 120 metres (390 ft) in width and stretching over 400 metres (1,300 ft) inland with the midden which Comer excavated located at its south end. The majority of the houses were more or less rounded, typically around 3 to 5 metres (9.8 to 16.4 ft) across and most likely residential. One house was rectangular 4.5 by 6 metres (15 by 20 ft), with narrow platforms along two of the walls, was probably a "qassi" or "men's house" and was probably used as a workshop and for social gatherings.

=== Artifacts ===
Subsequent to the initial finds, additional artifacts pertain to the Dorset culture, as well as items of Norse origin.

The vast majority of harpoon heads found are of the open socket type typical of the Thule culture.

== Twentieth-century settlement ==
In 1910, Rasmussen and Peter Freuchen established a private trading post as "Cape York". Local Inuit established a settlement area named "Uummannaq" near it. The settlement was called "Dundas" in English. In 1953, Dundas and nearby Pituffik were converted into Thule Air Force Base and their residents relocated to Qaanaaq.

== Climate ==
Dundas experiences a tundra climate (Köppen: ET); with short, cool summers & long, frigid winters.

Climate data for Dundas (76º34'N, 68º48'W, 21 m (69 ft) m AMSL) (1961-1975 data)
Month	Jan	Feb	Mar	Apr	May	Jun	Jul	Aug	Sep	Oct	Nov	Dec	Year
Record high °C (°F)	4.0 (39.2)	5.0 (41.0)	3.0 (37.4)	4.6 (40.3)	10.3 (50.5)	14.5 (58.1)	17.2 (63.0)	17.0 (62.6)	11.0 (51.8)	5.4 (41.7)	5.7 (42.3)	3.5 (38.3)	17.2 (63.0)
Mean daily maximum °C (°F)	−18.5 (−1.3)	−18.4 (−1.1)	−19.4 (−2.9)	−12.0 (10.4)	−2.0 (28.4)	4.1 (39.4)	7.0 (44.6)	6.6 (43.9)	1.3 (34.3)	−5.5 (22.1)	−12.0 (10.4)	−17.6 (0.3)	−7.2 (19.0)
Mean daily minimum °C (°F)	−28.2 (−18.8)	−28.1 (−18.6)	−28.5 (−19.3)	−22.1 (−7.8)	−9.8 (14.4)	−2.0 (28.4)	0.7 (33.3)	0.9 (33.6)	−4.0 (24.8)	−11.7 (10.9)	−19.9 (−3.8)	−25.6 (−14.1)	−14.9 (5.2)
Record low °C (°F)	−39.5 (−39.1)	−39.0 (−38.2)	−40.5 (−40.9)	−35.6 (−32.1)	−25.2 (−13.4)	−9.5 (14.9)	−4.0 (24.8)	−6.3 (20.7)	−19.6 (−3.3)	−31.2 (−24.2)	−34.5 (−30.1)	−38.0 (−36.4)	−40.5 (−40.9)
Average extreme snow depth cm (inches)	14 (5.5)	14 (5.5)	13 (5.1)	13 (5.1)	11 (4.3)	2 (0.8)	0 (0)	0 (0)	3 (1.2)	8 (3.1)	10 (3.9)	11 (4.3)	14 (5.5)
Source: Danish Meteorological Institute (1961-1975 data)
