= Elson Lagoon =

Alaskian lagoon

- Interactive map of Elson Lagoon
- Location: Alaska North Slope, Alaska, U.S.A.
- Coordinates: 71°14′12″N 155°56′12″W
- Primary outflows: Beaufort Sea
- Max. length: Approx. 8 km (5.0 mi)
- Max. width: 15 km (9.3 mi)
- Max. depth: Approx. 16 m (52 ft)
- Settlements: Utqiagvik

Elson Lagoon is the northernmost lagoon within the United States.
