= Birnirk site =

Archaeological site in Alaska, United States

- U.S. National Register of Historic Places
- U.S. National Historic Landmark
- Alaska Heritage Resources Survey
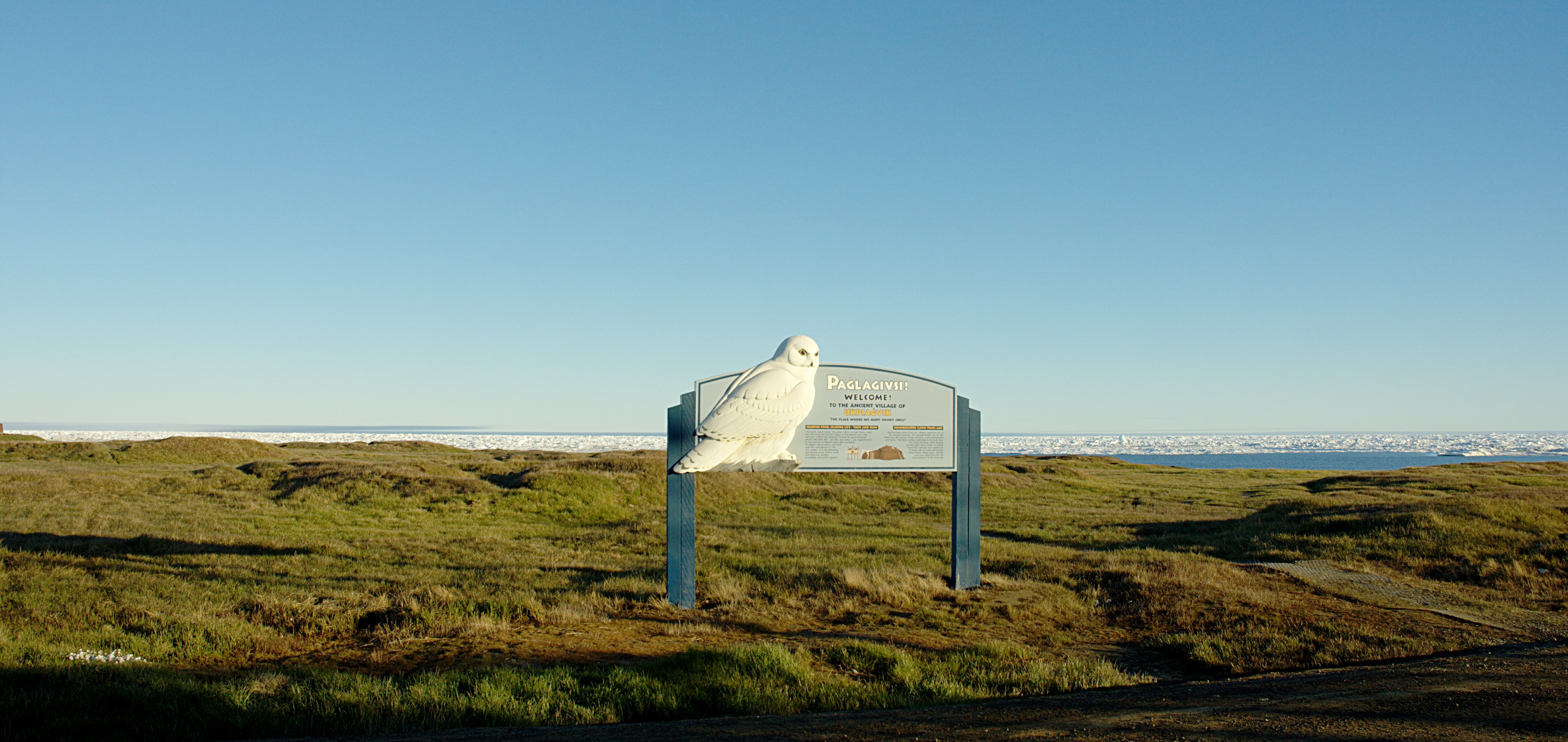
- Mounds at the site
- Location: Address restricted
- Nearest city: Utqiagvik, Alaska
- NRHP reference No.: 66000953
- AHRS No.: BAR-001

Significant dates
- Added to NRHP: October 15, 1966
- Designated NHL: December 29, 1962

The Birnirk site (Iñupiaq: Piġniq) is an archaeological site near Utqiagvik, Alaska. It includes sixteen prehistoric mounds which have yielded evidence of very early Birnirk and Thule culture. It is the type site of the Birnirk culture, and was designated a National Historic Landmark in 1962 for its archaeological importance in understanding prehistoric Arctic cultures.

== Description ==
Birnirk is located on the Alaska North Slope, near the settlement of Utqiagvik, on land owned by the Ukpeaġvik Iñupiat Corporation since 1988. The site consists of sixteen mounds, which represent dwelling sites across a fairly wide span of time. Major scientific excavations were made at this site in 1936, and in 1951–53, when three mounds were excavated, and in 1959, when seven mounds were partially excavated. The major period of occupation at this site was during what is now designated the Birnirk culture, between 500 and 900 CE. Evidence was also found at one mound of occupation during the later Thule culture, which was generally active 1100-1400 CE. Finds at the site include harpoon heads made of antler and stone, including at least one from the older Punuk culture. Also uncovered were fragments of wood making up elements of traditional seal-hunting umiaks.

The site was declared a National Historic Landmark in 1962, and was listed on the National Register of Historic Places in 1966. The major collections of materials from the site made in the 1950s were located at Harvard University's Peabody Museum of Archaeology and Ethnology for many years, but were moved to the University of Alaska Museum of the North in Fairbanks in 2011.

== See also ==
- List of National Historic Landmarks in Alaska
- National Register of Historic Places listings in North Slope Borough, Alaska
