= Birnirk culture =

Alaskan archaeological culture

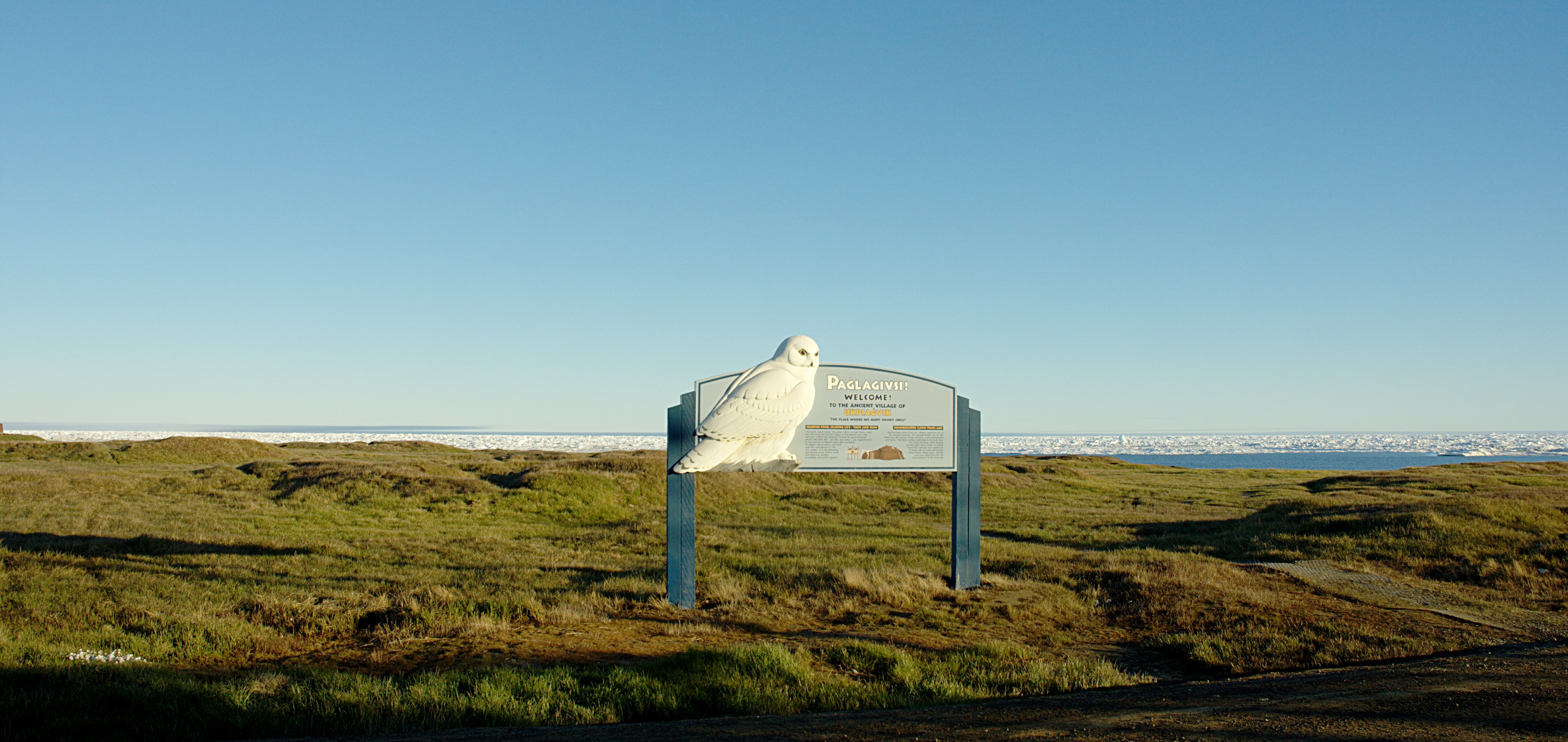
Sod house remains in Utqiagvik

The Birnirk culture was a prehistoric Inuit archaeological culture that flourished between the 6th and 12th centuries along the Alaska North Slope and the Chukchi Peninsula of present-day Russia. The Birnirk culture first appeared on the American side of the Bering Strait, descending from the Old Bering Sea and Okvik traditions and preceding the Thule people. It is distinguished by its advanced harpoon technology and other maritime hunting adaptations.

A Birnirk burial mound was discovered at Wales, Alaska, and sixteen more have been identified at the Birnirk site near Utqiagvik, now a National Historic Landmark. An ancient Birnirk village has also been documented at Ukpiaġvik, the historic settlement at the site of present-day Utqiagvik.

== Culture ==
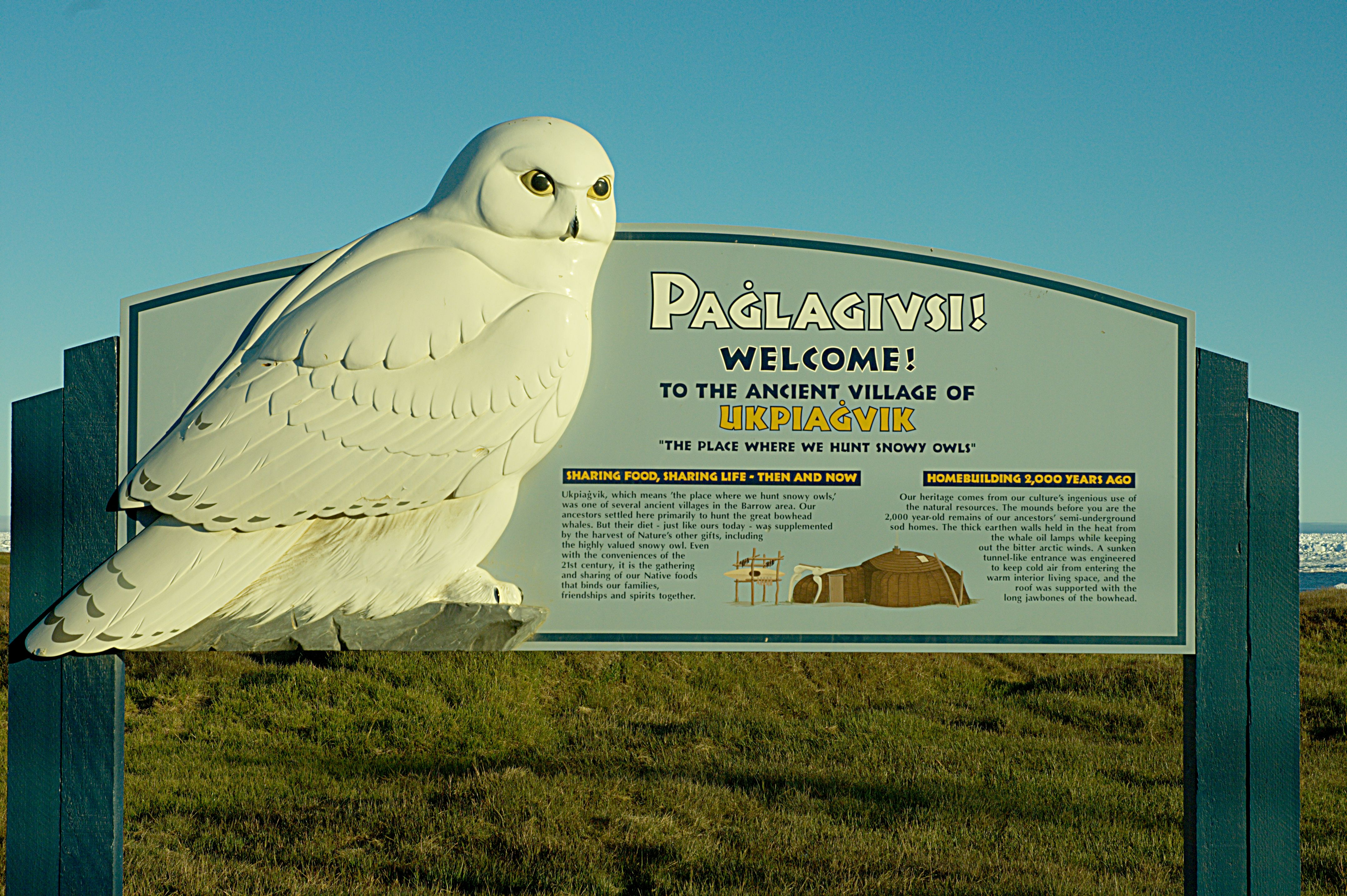
Paglagivsi sign in Utqiagvik, Alaska

The Birnirk people lived in small single family dwellings containing either a long or short entrance that led to a single room with sleeping platforms. Houses lacked open fireplaces; instead, heat and light were provided by stone and clay lamps. Birnirk settlements are thought to have been small, with only a few families living in a settlement at a time. As such, the concept of the Birnirk people whaling is often debated. Most communities involved in whaling require several crews, which would have been difficult for the Birnirk as they had such small settlements. However, a whaling harpoon found in Utqiagvik, along with artifacts derived from whale parts found in other sites (baleen, whale bones, and the like) suggest that the Birnirk people were involved in some form of whale hunts. They were also known to hunt seals, caribou, birds, and fish using a variety of tools.

== Tools ==
Archaeologists have recovered more than 20,000 artifacts from Birnirk sites, providing evidence about daily life in Arctic Alaska.

The Birnirk people developed specialized tools for hunting in the Arctic. They are particularly known for their distinctive harpoons, which were used to hunt seals and other marine mammals. Birnirk harpoon heads were self-pointed and featured a single lateral barb and an inset stone side blade. Hunters also used ice scratchers to imitate the sounds of seals moving beneath sea ice, helping to attract seals within range.

In addition to hunting equipment, Birnirk people made a wide range of everyday tools from slate, bone, antler, and baleen. These included knives, blades, arrows, and spears used for hunting and processing animals. Archaeologists have also recovered atlatls, ulus, bolas, meat forks, baleen bows, triangular baleen toboggans, and other objects used in daily life.

== Archaeology ==
The Birnirk culture takes its name from the Birnirk site near present-day Utqiagvik on Alaska's North Slope. Archaeologists had known about the site since the early twentieth century, but it was visited only a few times before archaeologist Wilbert Carter began a multi-year excavation there during the 1950s.

The site contains nineteen mounds made up of ancient sod houses, meat caches, and other materials of daily life. Carter and his team identified evidence from four periods of occupation: Birnirk, Thule, Late Prehistoric, and Early Contact. The layered remains show that people returned to and reused the site over many generations.

Evidence of Birnirk communities has also been found elsewhere in northwestern Alaska. A burial mound has been identified at Wales, while sixteen additional burial mounds and the remains of an ancient village have been documented near present-day Utqiagvik.

== Genetics ==
A genetic study published in Science in August 2014 examined the remains of five Birnirk individuals buried in Siberia between c. 570 and 680 CE. The results suggested that the Birnirk people were the ancestors of the later Thule people. All five individuals carried the maternal haplogroup A2a, which was also the predominant maternal lineage among the Thule people. The genetic evidence suggested that the Thule people descended from Birnirk populations and ultimately replaced the genetically distinct Indigenous Dorset people in northern Canada and Greenland.

== See also ==
- Ipiutak site

== Sources ==
- Raghavan, Maanasa; DeGiorgio, Michael; Albrechtsen, Anders; et al. (29 August 2014). "The genetic prehistory of the New World Arctic". Science. 345 (6200). doi:10.1126/science.1255832. PMID 25170159. S2CID 353853.
