= Thule people =

Precursors of the Inuit and Yupik peoples

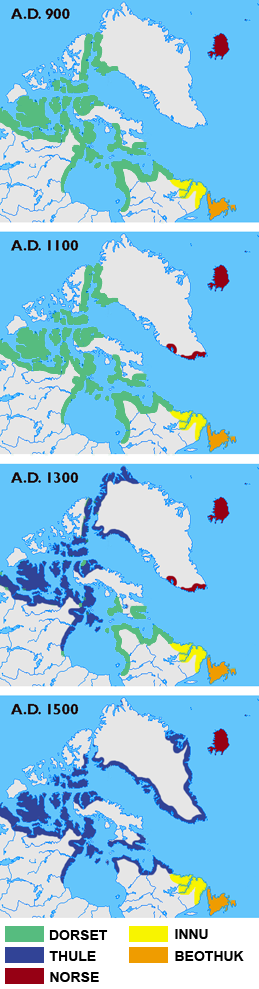
The different cultures in Greenland, Labrador, Newfoundland and the Canadian arctic islands between 900 CE and 1500 AD

The Thule (/ˈtuːli/ TOO-lee, also /ˈθuːl/ THOOL) or proto-Inuit were the precursors of all modern Inuit and Yupik peoples. They developed in coastal Alaska by 1000 CE and expanded eastward across northern Canada, reaching Greenland by the 13th century. In the process, they replaced people of the earlier Dorset culture who had previously inhabited the region. The appellation "Thule" originates from the location of Thule, now known as Pituffik (a settlement relocated and renamed Qaanaaq in 1953) in northwest Greenland, facing Canada, where the archaeological remains of the people were first found at Comer's Midden.

Evidence supports the idea that the Thule (and, to a lesser degree, the Dorset) were in contact with the Vikings, who had reached the shores of Canada in the 11th century as part of the Norse colonization of North America. In Viking sources, these peoples are called the Skrælingjar.

Some Thule migrated southward, in the "Second Expansion" or "Second Phase". By the 13th or 14th century, the Thule had occupied an area inhabited until then by the Dorset, and by the 15th century, the Thule had replaced the Dorset.

Intensified contacts with Europeans began in the 18th century. Compounded by the already disruptive effects of the "Little Ice Age" (1650–1850), the Thule communities broke apart, and the people became known as the Eskimo (a term now considered offensive), and later, Inuit and Yupik.

== History ==
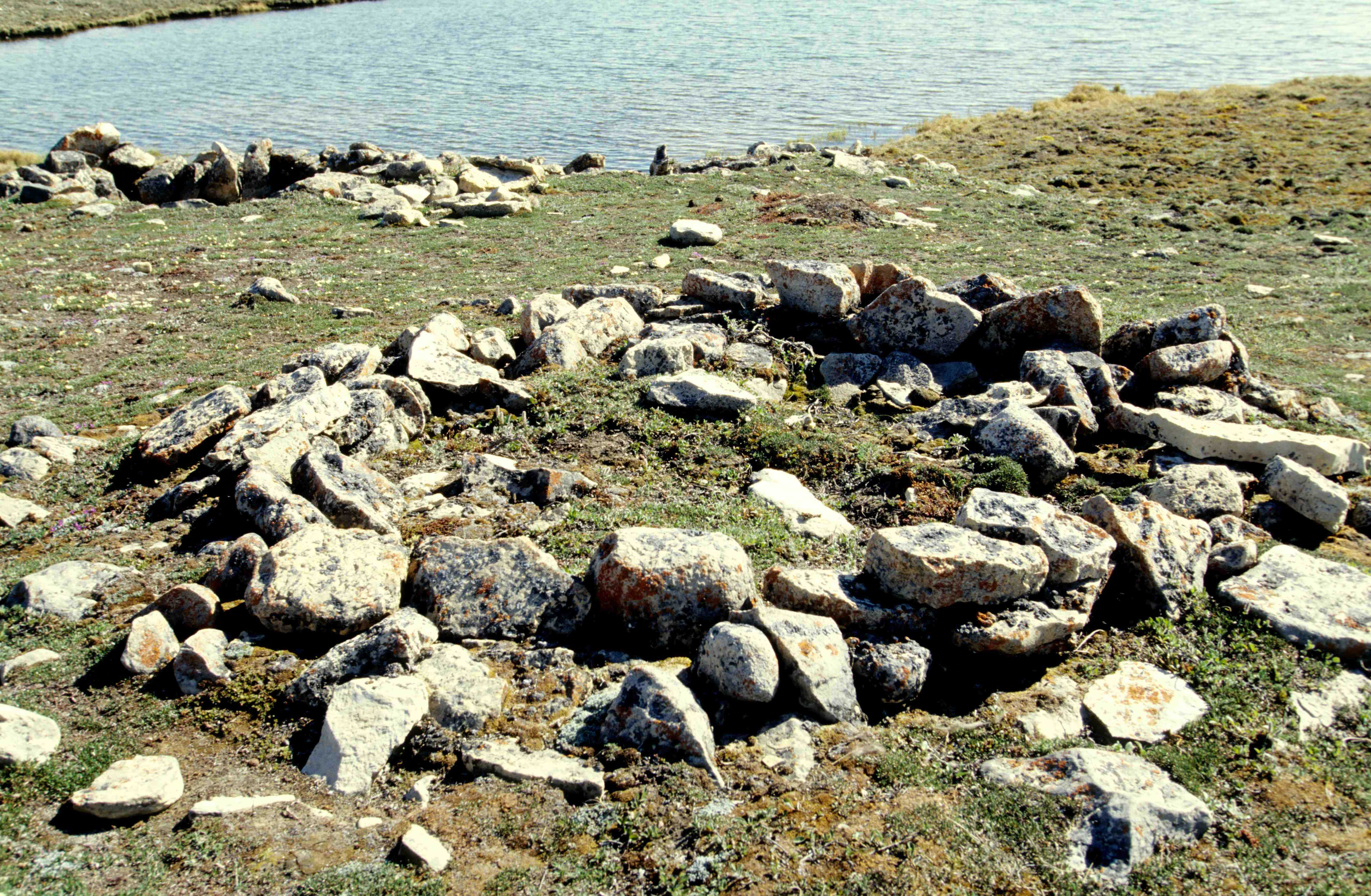
Thule site near Cambridge Bay on Victoria Island

The Thule Tradition lasted from about 200 BCE to 1600 CE around the Bering Strait, the Thule people being the prehistoric ancestors of Inuit and Yupik. The Thule culture was mapped out by Therkel Mathiassen, following his participation as an archaeologist and cartographer of the Fifth Danish Thule Expedition, led by Knud Rasmussen, to Arctic America in 1921–1924. He excavated sites on Baffin Island and the northwestern Hudson Bay region, which he considered to be the remains of a highly developed Eskimo whaling culture that had originated in Alaska and moved to Arctic Canada approximately 1000 years ago.

There are three stages of development leading up to Thule culture: the Okvik / Old Bering Sea stage, the Punuk stage, and the Birnirk stage. These stages represent variations of the Thule Tradition as it expanded over time. These groups of peoples have been referred to as "Neo-Eskimo" cultures, which are differentiated from the earlier Norton tradition.

=== Old Bering Sea stage, 200 BCE to 500 CE ===
The Old Bering Sea (OBS) stage was first characterized by Diamond Jenness, on the basis of a collection of deeply patinated decorated ivory harpoon heads and other objects dug up by natives on the St. Lawrence and Diomede Islands. Jenness identified the Bering Sea culture as a highly developed Inuit culture of northeastern Asiatic origin and pre-Thule in age.

A strong maritime adaptation is characteristic of the Thule, and the OBS stage, and then can be seen in the archaeological evidence. Both kayaks and umiaks (large skinned boats) appear in the archaeological record for the first time. The tool kits of the people of the time are dominated by polished-slate rather than flaked-stone artifacts, including lanceolate (shaped like the tip of a lance) knives, projectile heads, and the ulu transverse-bladed knife. The people also made a crude form of pottery and there was much use of bone and antlers for heads on harpoons, as well as to make darts, spears, snow goggles, blubber scrapers, needles, awls and mattocks, also walrus shoulder-blade snow shovels.

There are many important innovations that emerged that allowed hunting to be more efficient. Harpoon mounted ice picks were used for seal hunting, as well as ivory plugs and mouthpieces for inflating harpoon line floats, which enabled them to recover larger sea mammals when dispatched. These people relied heavily on seal and walrus for subsistence. It is easy to pick out OBS technology because of the artistic curvilinear dots, circles, and shorter lines that were used to decorate their tools.

The chronological relationship between the Okvik and Old Bering Seas cultures has been the subject of debate and remains largely undecided, based mainly on art styles. Some consider it to be a distinct culture pre-dating Old Bering Sea, but the close similarity and overlapping radiocarbon dates suggest Okvik and Old Bering Sea are best considered as roughly contemporaneous, with regional variants.

A 2019 genetic analysis concluded that between 2,700 and 4,900 years ago, the ancestors of the Thule emerged in Alaska through admixture between the Paleo-Eskimo and the Ocean Bay Tradition and that these ancestors subsequently migrated back to Siberia where they became the Old Bering Sea, only to eventually return to Alaska.

=== Punuk and Birnirk stages, c. 800 CE to 1400 CE ===
The Punuk stage is a development of Old Bering Sea stage, with distribution along the major Bering Strait islands and along to shores of the Chukchi Peninsula. The Punuk culture was initially defined by Henry Collins in 1928 from a 4.9 m (16 ft) deep midden on one of the Punuk Islands. Later excavation on St. Lawrence Island confirmed Jenness's ideas on the Bering Sea culture, and demonstrated a continual cultural sequence on the island from Old Bering Sea, to Punuk, to modern Eskimo culture.

Punuk is differentiated with Old Bering Sea through its artifact styles and house forms, as well as harpoon styles and whale hunting. Punuk settlements were larger and more common than earlier villages. They were subterranean, square or rectangular dwellings with wooden floors. The house was held up by whale jaw-bones, and covered in skins, sod and then snow. These houses were nicely insulated, and would have been only visible to the occupants.

Whaling has a greater emphasis in the Punuk stage. Hunters would use umiaks and kill whales in narrow ice leads as well as in the open sea in the fall. Open sea whaling required skilled leadership, teams of expert boatmen and hunters, and the cooperation of several boats. The whaleboat captain, the umialik, is still a prominent position in Alaskan Arctic communities today. Chipped stone tools were replaced by ground slate, ivory winged trident were in uses, and iron-tipped tools were used for engraving. Harpoon styles became simpler and more standardized, as did Punuk art. The Punuk developed their methods of hunting that led to the creation of armour made from bone as well as the technology of the bow and arrow. As well, bone plated wrist guards, the reinforced bow, bird bolas, heavy ivory net sinkers, and blunt tipped bird arrows appeared in the Punuk stage.

Birnirk culture is best known along coastal northern and western Alaska. There are three phases of Birnirk culture: Early Birnirk, Middle Birnirk, and Late Birnirk. These phases were primarily distinguishable by gradual changes in harpoon head and arrow styles. Harpoon heads were more often made of antler, rather than ivory, and were characterized by medially-placed, trifurcated spurs during Early Birnirk, bifurcated in Middle Birnirk, and single-laterally-placed spurs in Late Birnirk.

The Birnirk people used many of the same hunting methods and technology as Punuk and Old Bering Sea, but there was no art. There is very little evidence of tool or weapon decoration. The little art that was present in the Birnirk stage was limited to spiral and concentric motifs on clay pots with bone paddles. They did use sledges, of the same basic design as the dog sleds that were later used with dog teams. Birnirk people were sea-mammal hunters who engaged in fishing and whaling. Birnirk houses were square shaped, with walls constructed of horizontal logs and single or double posts in each corner. Sleeping areas were at the back of the dwelling and were either built up or at floor level. No interior hearths were found in the house ruins, although heavily encrusted and fire-blackened pottery vessel fragments suggest extensive use of open fires.

=== Expansion into the western and eastern Arctic 900 to 1100 CE ===
Between 900 and 1100 CE, the Thule Tradition spread westward. The efficiency of housing was improved as they spread to the west and hunting methods were improved due to the use of dog sleds, umiaks, and kayaks. This enabled the hunters to travel further to hunt and follow the migration of the large game and sea mammals. After 1000, the practice of using polished slate for tool making continued to spread to the Aleutian Islands. The methods of pottery making also spread and replaced the Norton tradition in Southern Alaska. There were differences between the areas to which the tradition migrated. Houses in the more eastern region were more above ground and round with stone platforms to sleep on. The shape and support for the buildings came from whale bones. Eastern populations preferred soapstone domestic items instead of pottery and developed the use of dogs to pull sleds.

Sometime around the beginning of the 2nd millennium, Thule people began migrating east. As western Thule peoples settled the northern and western coasts of Alaska, other Thule groups migrated eastward across the Canadian Arctic as far as Greenland. Prior to 1000, the central and eastern Canadian Arctic were occupied by people of the Dorset culture. Within a few centuries, Dorset culture was completely displaced by Thule immigrants from the west. Evidence of contact between Dorset and Thule peoples is scarce and the nature of the Dorset / Thule succession remains poorly understood.

Thule culture was first identified in the Eastern Arctic by interdisciplinary researches of Danish scholars between 1921 and 1924. A team of anthropologists, archaeologists and natural scientists compiled a massive description of the Canadian Arctic on the fifth Thule expedition. Therkel Mathiassen added upon their research and claimed that the tradition had started out in Alaska, and that Thule hunting was based on the dog sled, the large skin boat and the kayak which enabled them to range over a much greater hunting territory, participate in widespread trade, and transport heavier loads. Mathiassen was right about his hypotheses and even mapped out the Thule migration and interaction with Greenland.

There are many different theories as to why the Thule moved out of the Bering Strait. One is the cultural-ecological model developed by R. McGhee. The idea is that the first Thule families to move followed groups of bowhead whales, which were an important source of food, fuel and raw materials. The onset of the Neo-Atlantic climatic episode, a warming trend which occurred between 900 and 1200 in the northern hemisphere, resulted in the lengthened season of open water along the North Alaskan Coast, and an extension of the summer range of bowhead whales into the Beaufort Sea and further east into the Arctic Archipelago. Like other whale species, bowheads tend to avoid ice-choked channels and passages because of the possibility of entrapment and death. General climatic warming may have reduced the extent and severity of pack ice, allowing bowheads and Thule hunters to expand eastward.

Another theory is that warfare in Alaska or a desire to seek out new resources of iron for making tools such as knives may have encouraged people to move eastward. Archaeologists have used the distribution of early Alaskan-style harpoon heads to track the routes taken by Thule people. One route follows the Beaufort Sea coast and Amundsen Gulf, entering the High Arctic via Parry Channel and Smith Sound. A second route led the Thule south, along the western coast of Hudson Bay.

=== Classic stage, 1100 to 1400 CE ===
During this time, eastern Thule spread out throughout the High Arctic and into the south. Thule people were living along the Hudson Strait coasts, in the Hudson Bay region, on the shores of the Foxe Basin, and along the present-day Canadian mainland from the Mackenzie Delta to the Melville Peninsula. The archaeologist Alan McCartney originally coined the term "Classic Thule" with reference to the population that existed between 1100 and 1400 CE.

The Thule people still lived in semi-subterranean winter houses, but in the summer moved into skin tents, the edges held down by circles of stone. The Thule were using iron long before European contact. In the west it was used in small quantities for carving knives and for engraving other tools. The iron came both from meteoric resources and from trade from the Norse expansion; the Thule worked raw iron into tools for their own use. Iron enabled the Thule people to work with more materials to make more wood and bone tools. The only problem they faced was a lack of a steady supply of metal. The Thule were clever with technology. Reports on classic Thule sites lists myriad artifacts used for hunting. Classic Thule placed much emphasis on the possible practicality of art. There were artistic details on household things such as combs but it involved very simple, linear designs featuring people without appendages, animals, or non-religious symbols.

=== Post-Classic stage, 1400 to 1600 CE ===
Post-Classic Thule tradition existed from 1400 CE up until European contact in areas where whales were not as prevalent so there is an increase in evidence of other means of subsistence, such as caribou, seal and fish. These settlements show a more gradual settlement of fewer whales and using more subsistence strategies from the west. The redistribution of the Thule people reflects the population pressures of the Classic Thule, but the climate played a more important role. The onset of the "Little Ice Age" that occurred between 1400 and 1600 limited the use of boats and number of whales present in the area. This shortened the season for open-water whale hunting. By the 16th century, umiak and kayak whale hunting had ceased in the High Arctic. By 1600, the people had moved on and abandoned the High Arctic due to the severe climate changes. The Thule who lived near open water were not as affected by the decrease in temperature. It was during this time that local groups such as the Copper Inuit, Netsilik, and Inglulingmuit (Inuit from the Igloolik area) emerged.

== Culture and lifeways ==
=== Communities and social organization ===
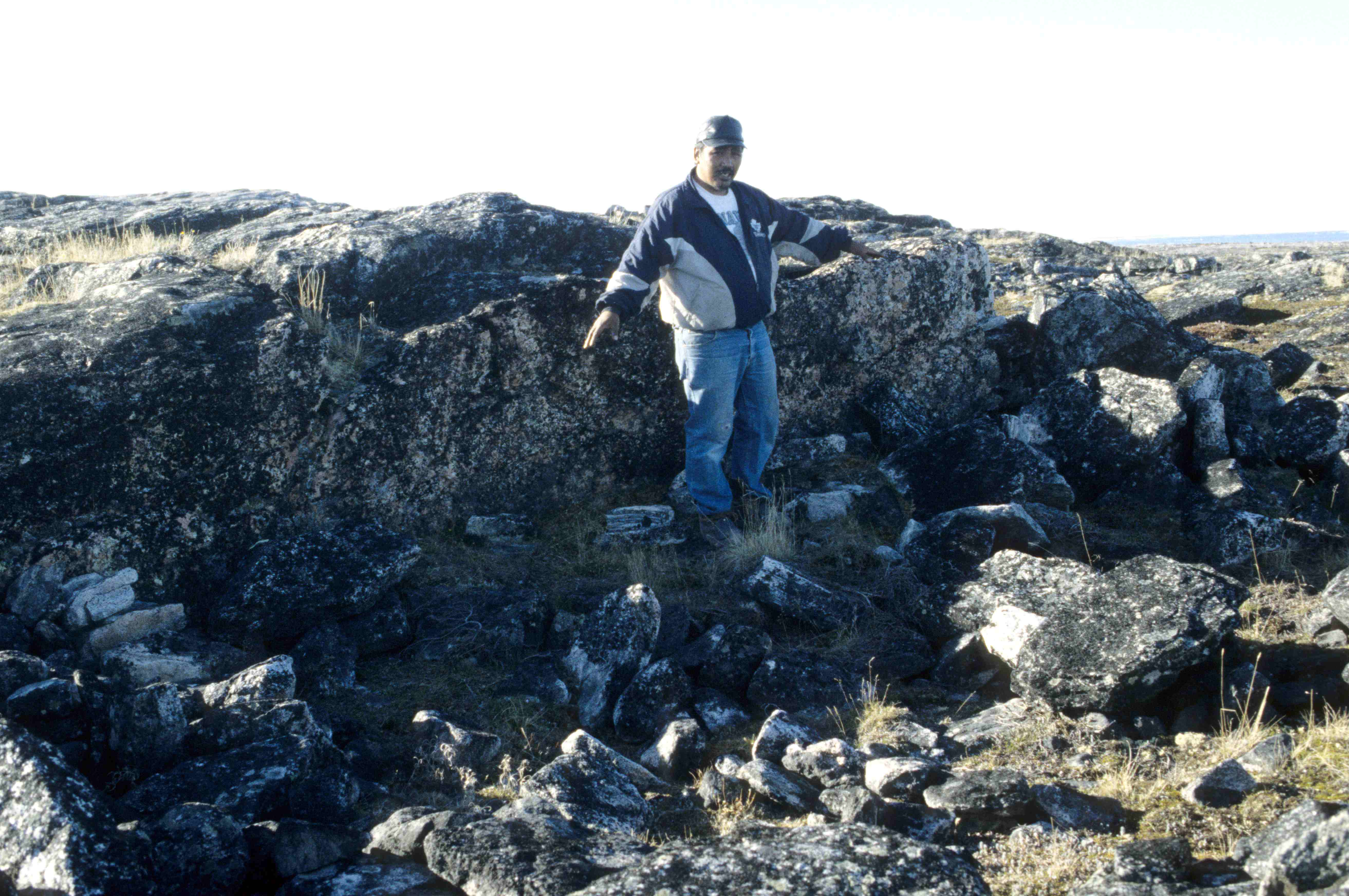
Inuk pointing out Thule site, June 1995

The culture of the Thule people differed significantly from that of the earlier Dorset people. Access to bowhead whales enabled some Thule communities to grow into the largest settlements of the prehistoric Arctic. In prime whaling areas, settlements typically contained between fifteen and twenty houses, while at least one known site contained sixty.

Houses were often built in clusters that may have housed extended family groups, and archaeologists have identified communal structures that appear to have been used for ceremonial activities. Not all households appear to have held the same status. Variations in the size, form, and contents of dwellings, including the presence of whaling equipment and non-local goods, may reflect differences in wealth or social standing between families. Some researchers have interpreted these differences as evidence of hierarchical social structures within certain Thule communities.

Open-sea whaling required the coordinated efforts of multiple crews and skilled leadership. In some communities, whaling expeditions were directed by a captain known as an umialik.

Settlements were also connected through trade networks. Native copper from the western Arctic and meteoric iron from northwestern Greenland circulated between communities.

=== Transportation and technology ===
The Thule travelled across the Arctic by dog sled, kayak, and umiak, a large skin-covered boat that played a central role in bowhead whaling. Dog sleds expanded the range over which people could travel and forage, while umiaks facilitated the hunting of bowhead whales.

Thule hunters used sophisticated harpoons, often fitted with points made from whale bone, and attached inflated floats to harpoon lines to help secure large prey. They also developed new uses for iron and copper. Where available, meteoritic iron was collected, worked, and traded between communities, and the Cape York meteorite in Greenland was one source of meteoritic iron used by Arctic peoples.

Other hunting equipment included bows and arrows, bird bolas, net sinkers, reinforced bows, wrist guards, and, in some regions, armour made from bone.

=== Hunting, whaling and subsistence ===
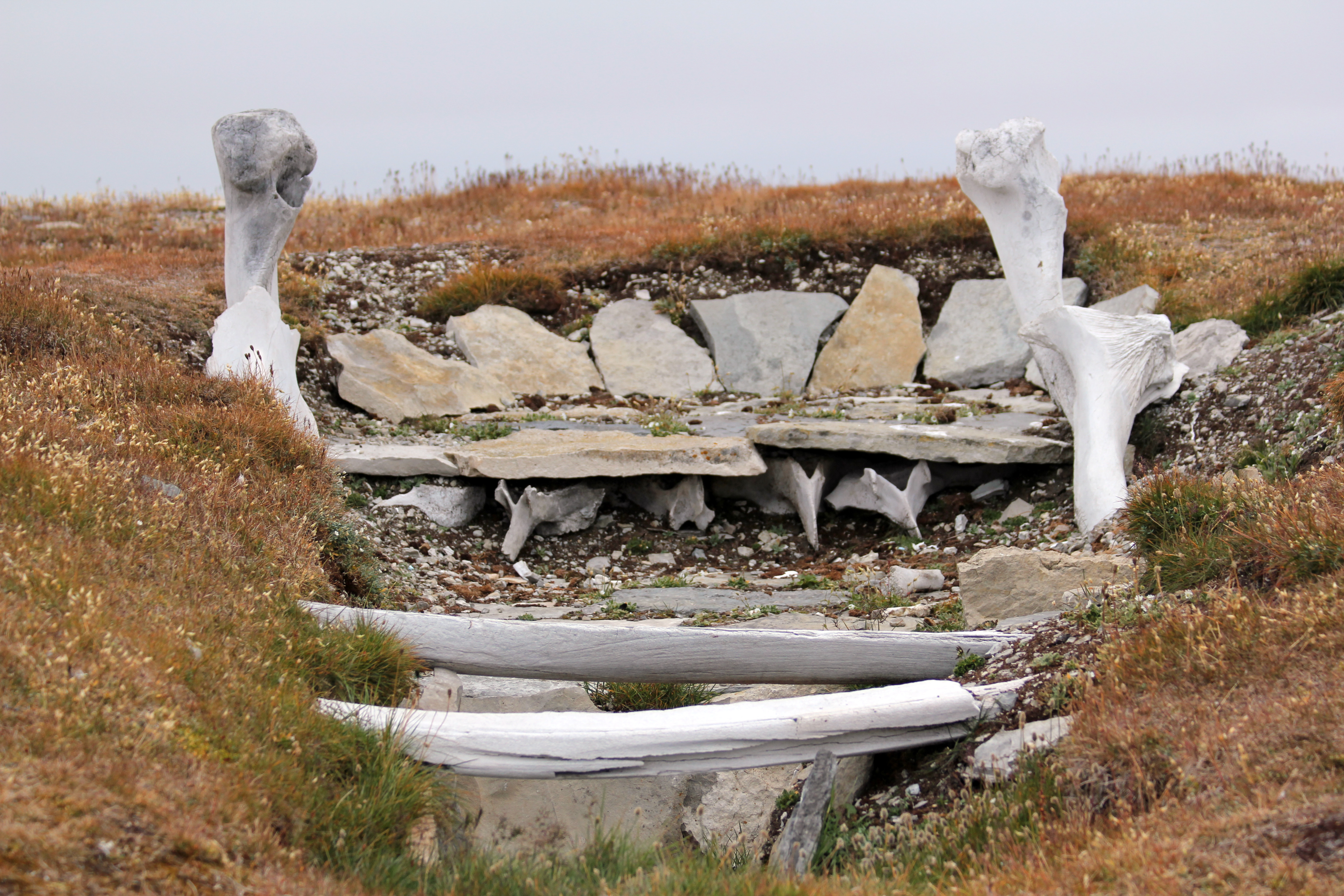
Whalebone used in the building of an ancient Thule home in Resolute, Nunavut

Bowhead whales lay at the heart of Classic Thule life. A single whale could provide food, fuel, building materials, and raw materials for tools. Meat supplied an important source of food, blubber provided oil for light and cooking, and bones were used in the construction of houses and the manufacture of tools. In some regions, whale jawbones served as structural supports for houses that were covered with skins, sod, and snow.

Whaling depended on cooperation. One hunter would strike the whale while others attached floats to slow and secure it. Once ashore, the whale was butchered and its meat, blubber, and bone were distributed throughout the community.

Archaeological evidence indicates that most bowhead remains recovered from Thule sites came from actively hunted whales rather than scavenged carcasses.

Outside major whaling communities, Thule people relied heavily on fish, large marine mammals, and caribou. As with whales, they sought to make use of as much of each animal as possible.

== Genetics ==
A genetic study published in Science in August 2014 examined the remains of Thule individuals buried between c. 1050 and 1600 CE, spanning more than five centuries of Thule occupation across the Arctic. The findings indicated that the Thule people descended from populations associated with the Birnirk culture of northwestern Alaska, whose roots lay across the Bering Strait in northeastern Siberia. As Thule communities expanded eastward from Alaska across the Canadian Arctic and into Greenland after about 1000 CE, they remained genetically distinct from the earlier Dorset people of the eastern Arctic. The study supported archaeological evidence that Thule populations had largely replaced Dorset populations in northern Canada and Greenland by about 1300 CE. No evidence of genetic admixture was found between the Thule people and the Greenlandic Norse people, despite several centuries during which the two populations occupied the island. Most sampled individuals belonged to the maternal haplogroup A2a, although haplogroups A, A2b and D3a2a were also identified.

== See also ==
- Qilakitsoq
- Saqqaq culture

== Sources ==
- Raghavan, Maanasa; DeGiorgio, Michael; Albrechtsen, Anders; et al. (29 August 2014). "The genetic prehistory of the New World Arctic". Science. 345 (6200) 1255832. Bibcode:2014Sci...34555832R. doi:10.1126/science.1255832. PMID 25170159. S2CID 353853.
