= 4733d Air Defense Group =

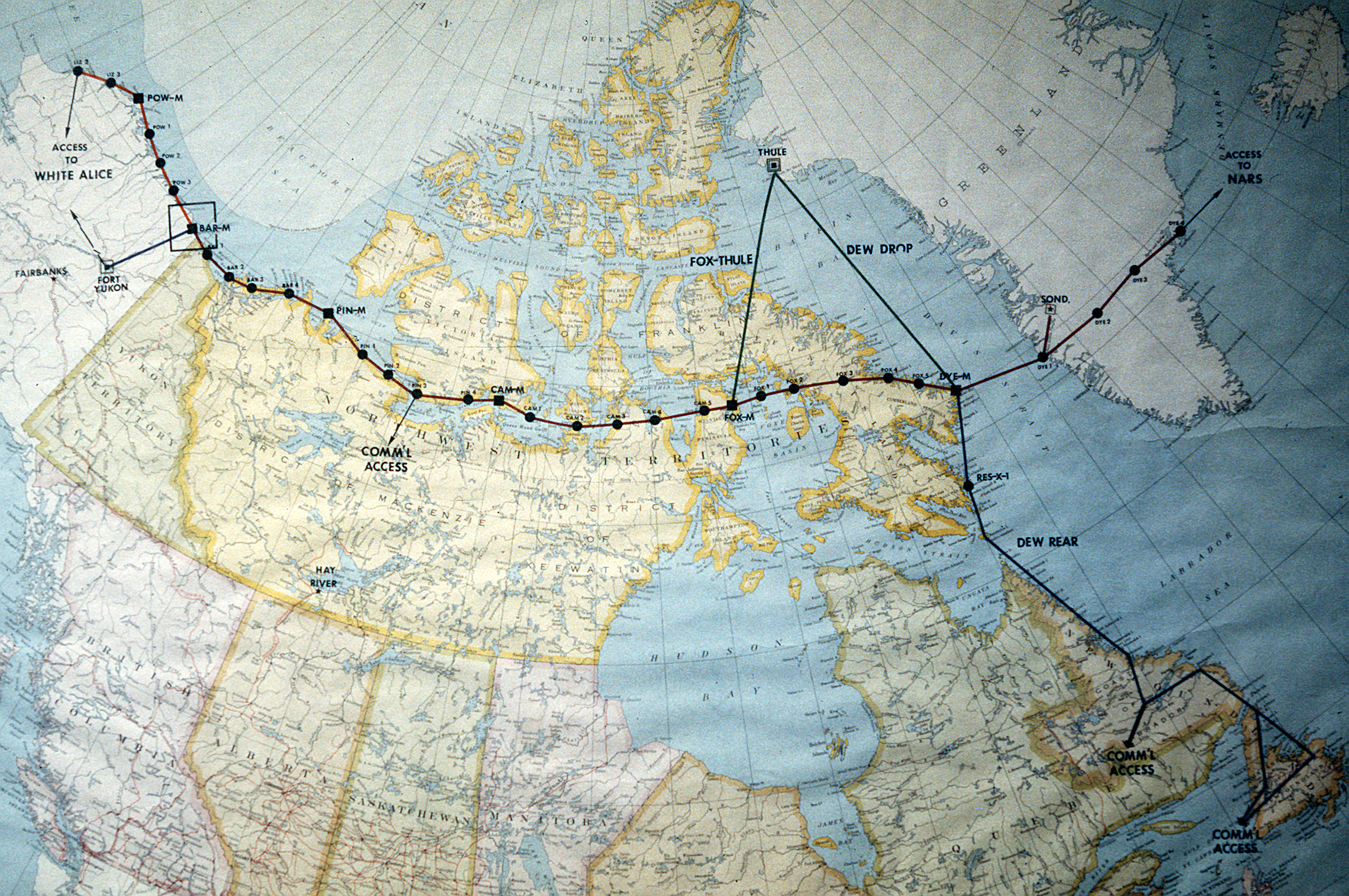
- Map of the DEW Line
- Active: 1957–1958
- Country: United States
- Branch: United States Air Force
- Role: Air defense

The 4733d Air Defense Group is a discontinued United States Air Force organization. Its last assignment was with the 64th Air Division at Frobisher Bay Air Station, Baffin Island, Northwest Territories, Canada, where it was discontinued in 1958. The group was formed in 1957 when Air Defense Command assumed responsibility for air defense of Northern Canada from Northeast Air Command, including support for remote Distant Early Warning Line (DEW Line) radar sites. It also controlled two squadrons operating radars at dispersed locations. It was discontinued in 1958 and its DEW Line support mission transferred to the 4601st Support Group and its radar squadrons to the 4732d Air Defense Group in Newfoundland.

== History ==
The group was organized in the fall of 1957 at Frobisher Bay Air Station by Air Defense Command (ADC) when ADC assumed the mission of Northeast Air Command (NEAC) after NEAC's inactivation. The group was assigned two general surveillance radar squadrons, stationed in the high latitudes of northern Canada, which had been assigned directly to NEAC's 64th Air Division. The group's mission was to provide detection and reporting of aircraft in the northern portion of North America and to support Distant Early Warning Line (DEW) radar sites. The group was discontinued in 1958 and the DEW support mission was taken over by the 4601st Support Group (DEW) at Paramus, New Jersey, while its radar stations were reassigned to the 4732d Air Defense Group at Goose Air Force Base, Labrador.

=== Lineage ===
- Designated as the 4733d Air Defense Group and organized on 1 April 1957

Discontinued on 1 May 1958

=== Assignments ===
- 64th Air Division, 1 April 1957 – 1 May 1958

=== Components ===
- 920th Aircraft Control and Warning Squadron

Resolution Island Air Station, Northern Territories, Canada, 1 April 1957 – 1 May 1958

- 926th Aircraft Control and Warning Squadron

Frobisher Bay Air Station, Northwest Territories, Canada, 1 April 1957 – 1 May 1958

=== Stations ===
- Frobisher Bay, 1 April 1957 – 1 May 1958

=== Commander ===
- Lt Col. Homer E. Chatfield, 1 April 1957 – 1 May 1958

== See also ==
- List of United States Air Force aircraft control and warning squadrons
