= 4732d Air Defense Group =

4732nd Air Defense Group
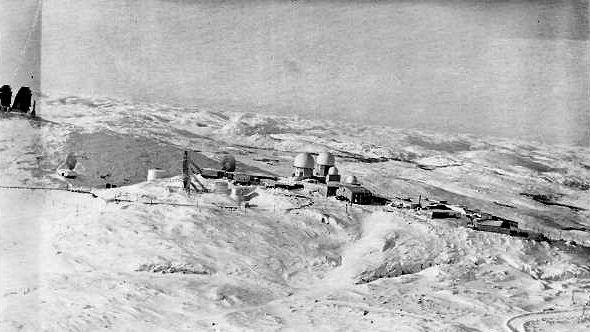
- 4732d Air Defense Group radar station at Hopedale, Labrador
- Active: 1957–1960
- Country: United States
- Branch: United States Air Force
- Role: Air defense

The 4732nd Air Defense Group is a discontinued United States Air Force organization. Its last assignment was with the 64th Air Division of Air Defense Command at Goose Air Force Base, Newfoundland, Canada, where it was discontinued in 1960. The group was formed in 1957 when ADC assumed responsibility for air defense of Newfoundland and Northern Canada from Northeast Air Command and controlled a fighter-interceptor squadron at Harmon and seven squadrons operating radars at dispersed locations. It was discontinued when Goose Air Defense Sector assumed responsibility for the air defense of Newfoundland and Northern Canada.

== History ==
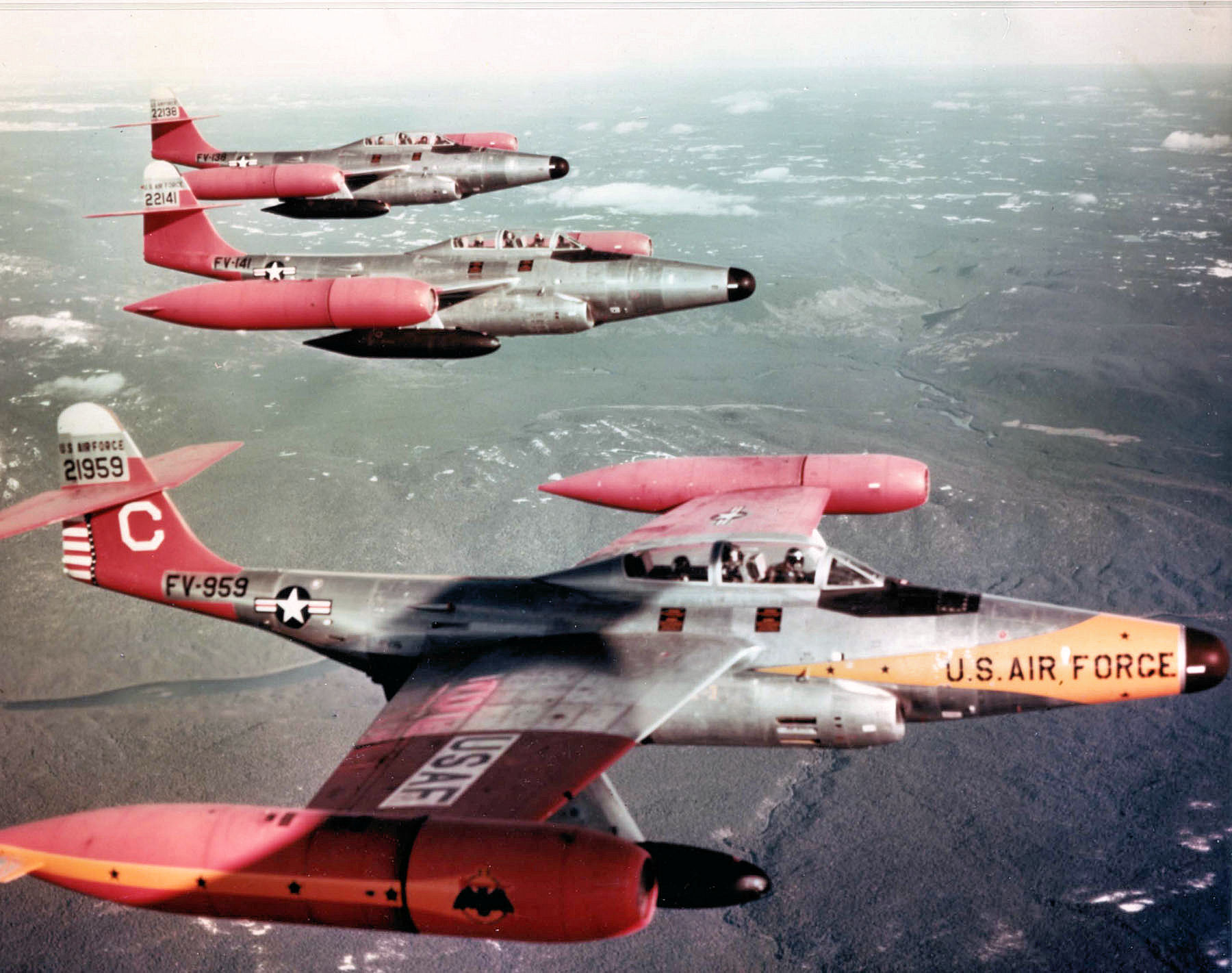
59th Fighter-Interceptor Squadron F-89s

The group was formed in 1957 when Air Defense Command (ADC) assumed responsibility for air defense of Newfoundland from Northeast Air Command (NEAC). It was a tenant organization at Goose Air Force Base, a Strategic Air Command base, whose 4082nd Air Base Group (later 4082nd Combat Support Group) assumed host base duties from NEAC. it controlled both radar and fighter squadrons in Canada. It was assigned the 59th Fighter-Interceptor Squadron, flying Northrop F-89 Scorpion aircraft, and the 4739th Radar Evaluation Flight, both of which were already stationed at Goose, and seven remote aircraft control & warning squadrons as operational elements, all of which were transferred from NEAC. The group provided air defense of northeast North America. The 4732d was discontinued in 1960 and its subordinate units were assigned to the Goose Air Defense Sector.

== Lineage ==
- Designated and organized as the 4732nd Air Defense Group on 1 April 1957

Discontinued on 1 April 1960

=== Assignments ===
- 64th Air Division, 1 April 1957 – 1 April 1960

=== Components ===
- 59th Fighter-Interceptor Squadron, 1 April 1957 – 1 April 1960
- 4739th Radar Evaluation Flight (Electronic Countermeasures), 1 April 1957 – early 1958 (Note: The flight was reassigned from the 64th Air Division and redesignated from 6630th Radar Evaluation Flight. Cornett & Johnson, p. 176.)
- 641st Aircraft Control and Warning Squadron

Melville Air Station, Labrador, 1 April 1957 – 1 April 1960

- 920th Aircraft Control and Warning Squadron

Resolution Island Air Station, Northern Territories, 1 May 1958 – 1 April 1960

- 921st Aircraft Control and Warning Squadron

Saint Anthony Air Station, Labrador, 1 April 1957 – 1 April 1960

- 922d Aircraft Control and Warning Squadron

Cartwright Air Station, Labrador, 1 April 1957 – 1 April 1960

- 923d Aircraft Control and Warning Squadron

Hopedale Air Station, Labrador, 1 April 1957 – 1 April 1960

- 924th Aircraft Control and Warning Squadron

Saglek Air Station, Labrador, 1 April 1957 – 1 April 1960

- 926th Aircraft Control and Warning Squadron

Frobisher Bay Air Base, Northern Territories, 1 May 1958 – 1 April 1960

=== Stations ===
- Goose Air Force Base, Newfoundland, Canada, 1 April 1957 – 1 April 1960

=== Aircraft ===
- Northrop F-89J Scorpion 1957–1960

== See also ==
- List of United States Air Force Aerospace Defense Command Interceptor Squadrons
- List of United States Air Force aircraft control and warning squadrons
- United States general surveillance radar stations
