= 4731st Air Defense Group =

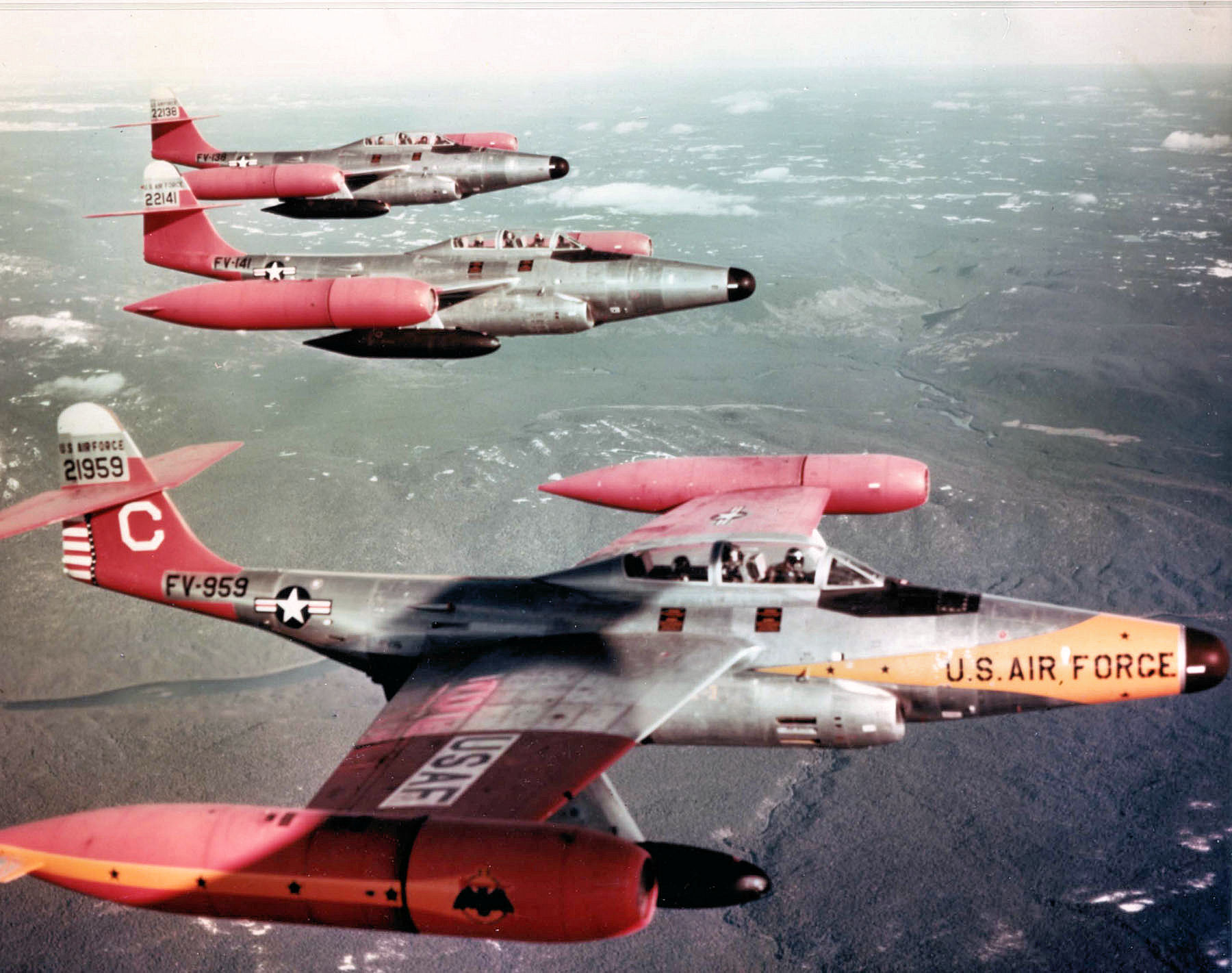
- F-89 Scorpions in flight over Labrador
- Active: 1957-1960
- Country: United States
- Branch: United States Air Force
- Type: Fighter interceptor and warning and control
- Role: Air defense
- Part of: Air Defense Command

The 4731st Air Defense Group is a discontinued United States Air Force organization. Its last assignment was with the 64th Air Division of Air Defense Command (ADC) at Ernest Harmon Air Force Base, Newfoundland, Canada, where it was inactivated in 1960. The group was formed in 1957 when ADC assumed responsibility for air defense of Newfoundland from Northeast Air Command and controlled a fighter-interceptor squadron at Harmon and two squadrons operating radars at dispersed locations. It was discontinued when Goose Air Defense Sector assumed responsibility for air defense of Newfoundland.

== History ==
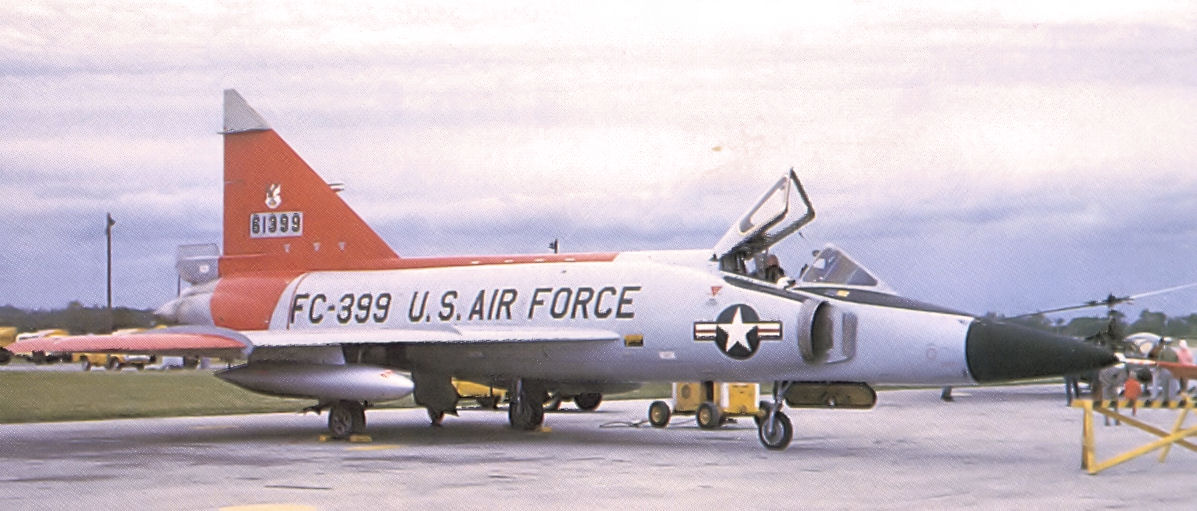
F-102A Delta Dagger as flown by the group

The group was formed in 1957 when Air Defense Command (ADC) assumed responsibility for air defense of Newfoundland from Northeast Air Command (NEAC). It was a tenant organization at Ernest Harmon Air Force Base, a Strategic Air Command base, and whose 4081st Air Base Group assumed host base duties from NEAC. The group controlled both radar and fighter squadrons in Canada. It was assigned the 61st Fighter-Interceptor Squadron (FIS), flying Northrop F-89 Scorpion aircraft, which was already stationed at Harmon, and two remote aircraft control & warning squadrons as its operational elements. These units were transferred from NEAC.

In October 1957, the 61st FIS moved to Wisconsin to replace the 323d Fighter-Interceptor Squadron, which moved from Wisconsin in a swap of stations. The 323d FIS, however, flew newer F-102 Delta Daggers, rather than Scorpions. The 4731st provided air defense of northeast North America. The group was discontinued in 1960 and its subordinate units were assigned to the Goose Air Defense Sector.

== Lineage ==
- Organized as the 4731st Air Defense Group on 1 April 1957

Discontinued on 1 July 1960

=== Assignments ===
- 64th Air Division, 1 April 1957 – 1 July 1960

=== Components ===
- 61st Fighter-Interceptor Squadron, 1 April-15 October 1957
- 323d Fighter-Interceptor Squadron, 15 October 1957 – 6 June 1960
- 640th Aircraft Control and Warning Squadron, 1 April 1957 – 6 June 1960, Stephenville Air Station
- 642d Aircraft Control and Warning Squadron, 1 April 1957 – 6 June 1960, Red Cliff Air Station

Stations

- Ernest Harmon Air Force Base, Newfoundland, Canada, 1 April 1957 – 1 July 1960

=== Aircraft ===
- Northrop F-89D Scorpion: 1957
- Convair F-102A Delta Dagger: 1957-1959

=== Commanders ===
- Col. John F. Daye, Jr., 1958 - c. 31 Dec 1959
- Maj. Ray E. Arnold, c. 1 Jan 1960 - 1960

== See also ==
- List of USAF Aerospace Defense Command General Surveillance Radar Stations
- Aerospace Defense Command Fighter Squadrons
- List of United States Air Force aircraft control and warning squadrons
