= Stephenville Air Station =

Closed General Surveillance Radar station

Stephenville Air Station
- Part of Pinetree Line
- Newfoundland, Canada
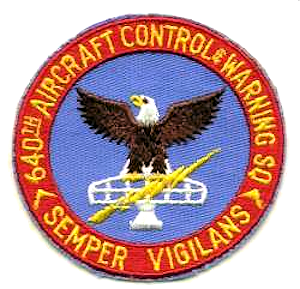
- 640th Aircraft Control and Warning Squadron emblem

Site information
- Type: Radar Station
- Code: N-23
- Controlled by: Northeast Air Command; Aerospace Defense Command

Location
- Coordinates: 48°35′21″N 058°39′58″W

Site history
- Built: 1951
- Built by: United States Air Force
- In use: 1951-1971

Location of Stephenville AS

Stephenville Air Station (ADC ID: N-23) is a closed General Surveillance Radar station. It is located 9.5 kilometres (5.9 mi) north-northwest of Stephenville, Newfoundland and Labrador, Canada. It was closed in 1971.

== History ==
The site was established in 1951 as a General Surveillance Radar station, built by the United States Air Force as part of the Pinetree Line of Ground-Control Intercept (GCI) radar sites.

== USAF units and assignments ==
Units:

- 640th Aircraft Control and Warning Squadron

Assignments:

- 64th Air Division (NEAC), 1 September 1951
- 4731st Air Defense Group (ADC), 1 November 1957
- Goose Air Defense Sector, 6 June 1960
- 37th Air Division, 1 April 1966
- 21st Air Division, 31 March 1970 – 30 June 1971

== See also ==
- List of USAF Aerospace Defense Command General Surveillance Radar Stations
