= 641st Aircraft Control and Warning Squadron =

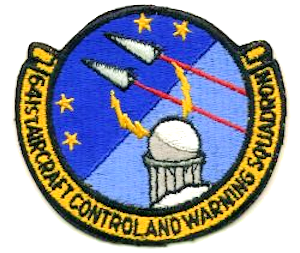
- Emblem of the 641st Aircraft Control and Warning Squadron
- Active: 1957-1971
- Country: United States
- Branch: United States Air Force
- Type: General Radar Surveillance

The 641st Aircraft Control and Warning Squadron is an inactive United States Air Force unit. It was last assigned to the 21st Air Division (ADTAC), Tactical Air Command, stationed at Melville Air Station, Newfoundland and Labrador, Canada (site N-24, later C-24). It was inactivated on 30 June 1971.

The unit was a General Surveillance Radar squadron providing for the air defense of North America.

Lineage

- Established as the 641st Aircraft Control and Warning Squadron, 1 August 1953

Activated 1 August 1953
Inactivated 30 June 1971

Assignments

- 64th Air Division, 1 August 1953
- 4732d Air Defense Group, 1 April 1957
- Goose Air Defense Sector, 1 April 1960
- 37th Air Division, 1 April 1966
- 21st Air Division, 31 March 1970 – 30 June 1971

Stations

- Goose AFB, Labrador, 1 August 1953
- Melville Air Station, Labrador, 1 November 1957 – 30 June 1971
