= 4683d Air Defense Wing =

4683d Air Defense Wing

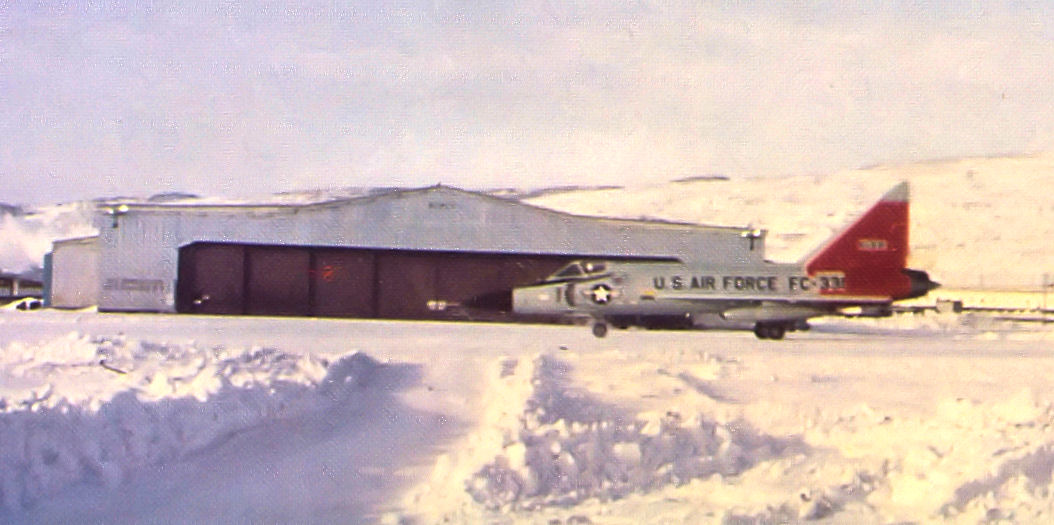
- Convair F-102 of the wing's 332d Fighter-Interceptor Squadron at Thule Air Base
- Active: 1960-1965
- Country: United States
- Branch: United States Air Force
- Role: Air Defense
- Part of: Air Defense Command
- Decorations: Air Force Outstanding Unit Award

Insignia
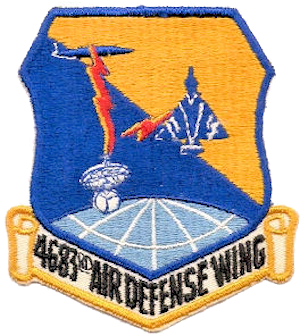
- Patch with 4683d Air Defense Wing emblem

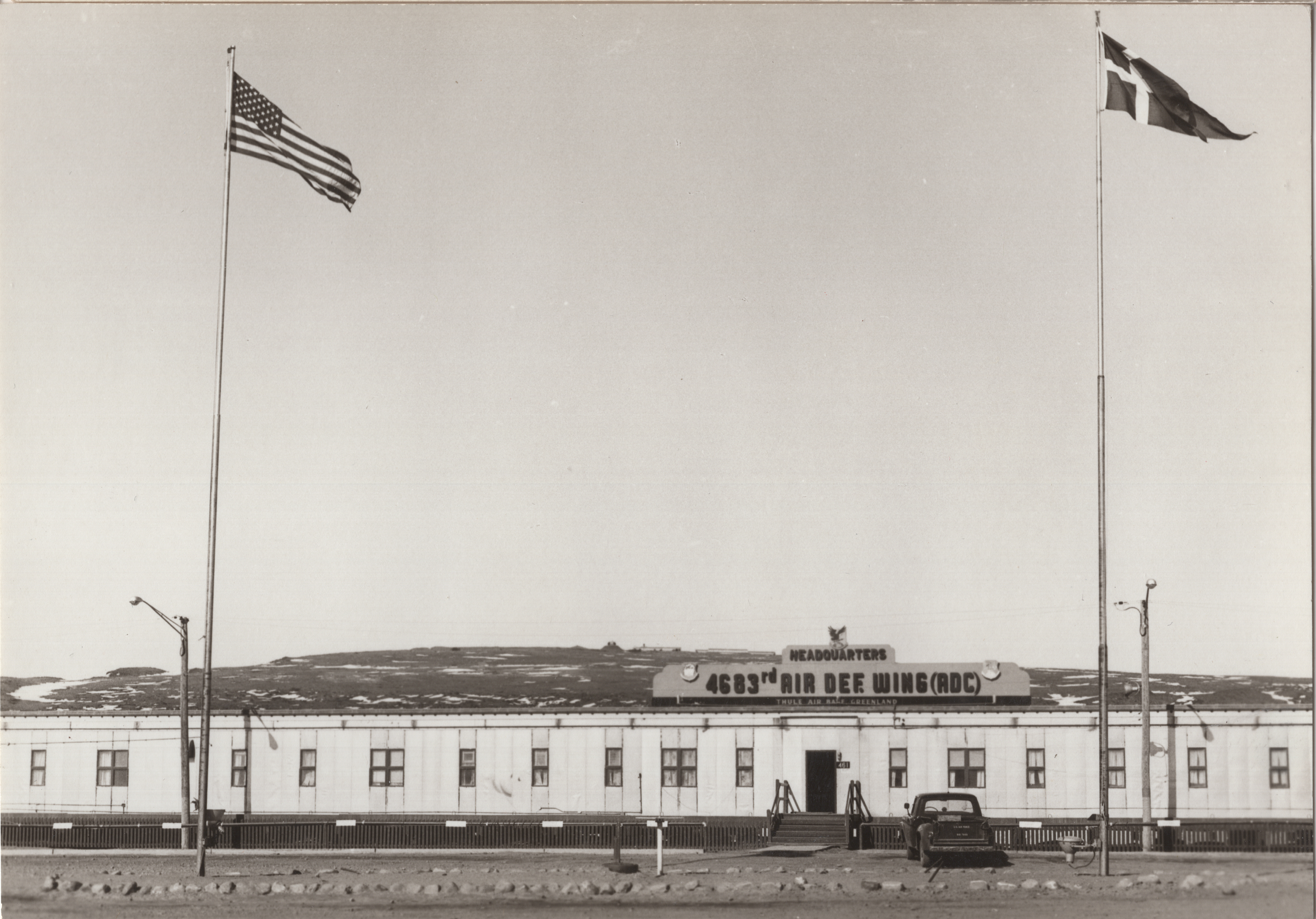
4683rd Air Defense Wing (ADC) Headquarters building from an official postcard sold at the Thule Base Exchange in 1963

The 4683d Air Defense Wing is a discontinued United States Air Force (USAF) organization. Its last assignment was with Aerospace Defense Command (ADC)'s Goose Air Defense Sector at Thule Air Base, Greenland, where it was discontinued in 1965.

The wing was organized in 1960 and assigned a fighter interceptor squadron and a squadron operating a radar for ground controlled interception. The 4683d also acted as the host organization at Thule until October, when support units were transferred to the 4683d Air Base Group, which was attached to the wing, but assigned to the 64th Air Division in Newfoundland. It supported the Ballistic Missile Early Warning System when the system was activated at Thule, but was discontinued when that mission supplanted the wing's traditional air defense mission.

== History ==
The 4683d Air Defense Wing was established in 1960 when Air Defense Command (ADC) assumed host responsibility for Thule Air Base from Strategic Air Command. Its operational mission was to act at the command and control echelon, controlling both a radar and a fighter squadron in Greenland to provide forward air defense of northeast North America. Through the attached 4683rd Air Base Group, the wing also acted as the United States Air Force host organization for Thule. The wing also provided support for an Army Nike Missile air defense unit.

The 931st Aircraft Control and Warning Squadron, already at Thule, was reassigned to the wing from the 64th Air Division immediately upon organization of the wing. The 931st was located on Pingarssuit Mountain (Site N-32), 20 miles south of the main base. The wing was assigned the 332d Fighter-Interceptor Squadron, flying Convair F-102 Delta Dagger interceptor aircraft when the squadron moved to Thule from England Air Force Base, Louisiana in September 1960. It also supported the Ballistic Missile Early Warning System (BMEWS) when the system was activated at Thule.

The 332d was inactivated at the end of May 1965. The wing was discontinued in July and replaced as host organization at Thule by the 4683d Air Base Group. The wing's 931st AC&W Sq was assigned to the 4683d Air Base Group until the squadron was inactivated on 24 December 1965. The Army's NIKE operations also ended in 1965, and Thule's primary mission became BMEWS operations.

== Lineage ==
- Designated as the 4683d Air Defense Wing and organized on 1 July 1960

Discontinued on 1 July 1965

=== Assignments ===
- 64th Air Division, 1 July 1960
- Goose Air Defense Sector, 1 July 1963 – 1 July 1965

=== Stations ===
- Thule AB, Greenland, 1 July 1960 – 1 July 1965

=== Components ===
Group

- 4683d Air Base Group (attached)

Designated, organized, assigned to Goose Air Defense Sector and attached to 4683d Air Defense Wing on 1 October 1960
Redesignated 4683d Combat Support Group on 1 April 1963
Redesignated 4683d Air Base Group on 1 July 1965 and relieved from attachment to 4683d Air Defense Wing
Reassigned to the 37th Air Division on 1 April 1966
Reassigned to the 21st Air Division on 1 December 1969
Discontinued on 31 March 1977

Operational Squadrons

- 332d Fighter-Interceptor Squadron, 1 September 1960 – 31 May 1965
- 931st Aircraft Control and Warning Squadron, 1 July 1960 – 1 July 1965
- 4683d Operations Squadron, 1 July 1960 – 1 October 1960

Support Units

- 4683d USAF Hospital, 1 July 1960 - 1 October 1960
- 4683d Air Police Squadron, 1 July 1960 - 1 October 1960
- 4683d Civil Engineering Squadron, 1 July 1960 - 1 October 1960
- 4683d Consolidated Aircraft Maintenance Squadron, 1 July 1960 - 1 July 1965
- 4683d Food Service Squadron, 1 July 1960 - 1 October 1960
- 4683d Supply Squadron, 1 July 1960 - 1 October 1960
- 4683d Transportation Squadron, 1 July 1960 - 1 October 1960

=== Aircraft ===
- Convair F-102A Delta Dagger, 1960-1965

=== Awards ===
| Award streamer | Award | Dates | Notes |
|---|---|---|---|
| | Air Force Outstanding Unit Award | 1 January 1962-18 July 1962 | |

=== Commanders ===
- Col. Chester L. Sluder, 1 July 1960 - 29 Oct 1960
- Col. David B. Tudor, 20 Jul 1962-18 July 1963
- Col. James W. Lancaster, by Jan 1965 - 1 July 1965

== See also ==
- List of MAJCOM wings
- List of USAF Aerospace Defense Command General Surveillance Radar Stations
- Aerospace Defense Command Fighter Squadrons
- List of United States Air Force aircraft control and warning squadrons
