= 920th Aircraft Control and Warning Squadron =

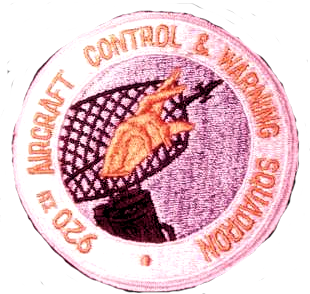
- Emblem of the 920th Aircraft Control and Warning Squadron
- Active: 1951-1961
- Country: United States
- Branch: United States Air Force
- Type: General Radar Surveillance

The 920th Aircraft Control and Warning Squadron is an inactive United States Air Force unit. It was last assigned to the Goose Air Defense Sector, Air Defense Command, stationed at Resolution Island Air Station, Northern Territories, Canada. It was inactivated on 1 November 1961.

The unit was a General Surveillance Radar squadron providing for the air defense of North America.

== Lineage ==
- Constituted 15 October 1951 as the 920th Aircraft Control and Warning Squadron

Activated on 1 November 1951
Inactivated on 1 November 1961

== Assignments ==
- 152d Aircraft Control and Warning Group (NEAC), 1 November 1951
- 64th Air Division (NEAC), 19 January 1952
- 4733d Air Defense Group (ADC), 1 April 1957
- 4732d Air Defense Group, 1 May 1958
- Goose Air Defense Sector, 1 April 1960 – 1 November 1961

== Stations ==
- Grenier AFB, New Hampshire, 1 November 1951
- McAndrew AFB, Newfoundland, Canada, 19 January 1952
- Resolution Island AS, Northern Territories, Canada ca. 30 June 1953 - 1 November 1961
