= 926th Aircraft Control and Warning Squadron =

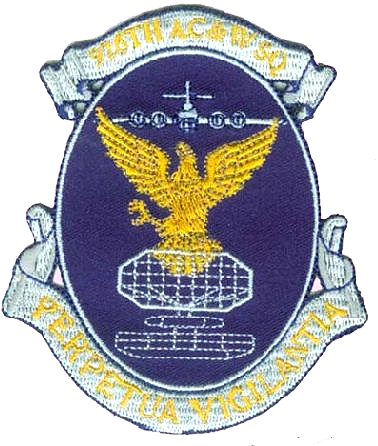
- Emblem of the 926th Aircraft Control and Warning Squadron; Emblem was developed by A/1c Robert D. Weitzel-1954-55
- Active: 1953-1961-developed by A/1c Robert D. Weitzel-1954-55
- Country: United States
- Branch: United States Air Force
- Type: General Radar Surveillance

The 926th Aircraft Control and Warning Squadron is an inactive United States Air Force unit. It was last assigned to the Goose Air Defense Sector, Air Defense Command, stationed at Frobisher Bay Air Base, Northwest Territories, Canada. It was inactivated on 1 November 1961.

The unit was a General Surveillance Radar squadron providing for the air defense of North America.

Lineage

- Activated as 926th Aircraft Control and Warning Squadron, 13 June 1953
- Inactivated 1 November 1961

Assignments

- 4707th Air Defense Wing, 13 June 1953
- 64th Air Division (NEAC), 1 October 1953
- 4733d Air Defense Group (ADC), 1 April 1957
- 4732d Air Defense Group, 1 May 1958
- Goose Air Defense Sector, 1 April 1960 – 1 November 1961

Stations

- Grenier AFB, New Hampshire, 13 June 1953
- Frobisher Bay AB, Northern Territories, 1 October 1953 – 1 November 1961
