= Goose Air Defense Sector =

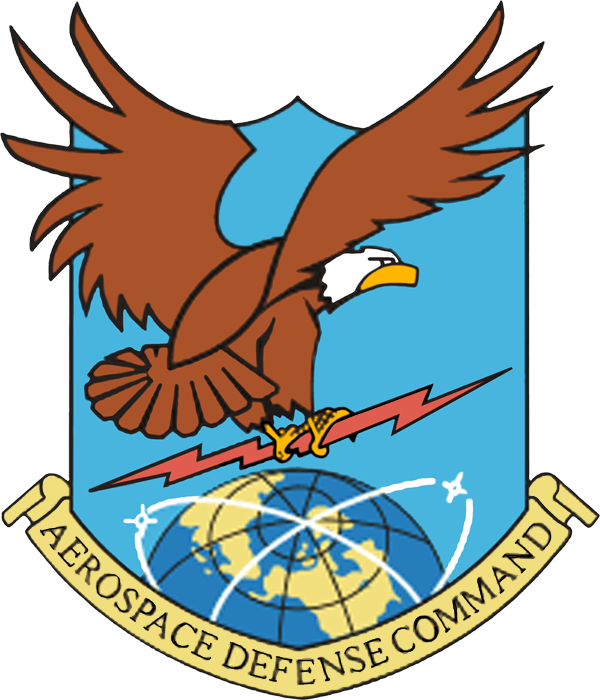
Goose Air Defense Sector

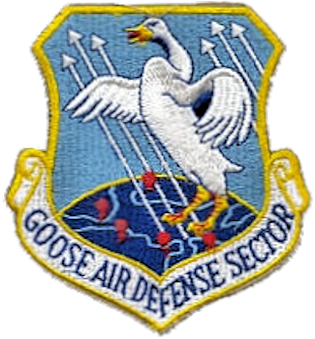
- Emblem of the Goose Air Defense Sector
- Active: 1960–1966
- Country: United States
- Branch: United States Air Force
- Role: Air Defense
- Part of: Aerospace Defense Command

The Goose Air Defense Sector (GADS) is an inactive United States Air Force organization. Its last assignment was with the 26th Air Division, being stationed at Goose Air Force Base, Labrador, Canada. It was inactivated on 1 April 1966 and replaced by the 37th Air Division.

== History ==
Command and control echelon of command, controlling both radar and fighter squadrons in Canada. Provided air defense of northeast North America. Assigned units of the 4732d Air Defense Group at Goose AFB in April 1960 and the 4731st Air Defense Group at Ernest Harmon AFB in June. Both groups were discontinued. These units included two Fighter-Interceptor Squadrons (FIS), although the 323rd FIS was discontinued almost immediately after transfer. Both squadrons flew F-102 "Delta Daggers," although the 59th FIS had not completed its conversion from F-89 "Scorpions" when it was first assigned Also operated Semi Automatic Ground Environment (SAGE) Direction Center (DC-31) (Manual) at CFB North Bay, Ontario 46°20′15″N 079°24′42″W Inactivated in 1966 and personnel and equipment transferred to 37th Air Division.

=== Lineage ===
- Constituted as Goose Air Defense Sector on 7 March 1960

Activated on 1 April 1960
Inactivated on 1 April 1966.

=== Assignments ===
- 64th Air Division, 1 April 1950 – 1 July 1963
- 26th Air Division, 1 July 1963 – 1 April 1966

=== Components ===
==== Air Force ====
- Air Forces Iceland

Keflavik Airport, 4 September 1963 – 1 April 1966

==== Wing ====
- 4683d Air Defense Wing

Thule AB, Greenland, 1 July 1963 – 1 July 1965

==== Groups ====
- 4683d Air Base Group 1 July 1965 – 1 April 1966

Thule AB, Greenland, 1 October 1960

- 4684th Air Base Group

Sondrestrom AB, Greenland, 4 September 1963 – 1 April 1966

==== Squadrons ====
- 59th Fighter-Interceptor Squadron 6 Jun 1960 -

Goose Bay AFB, Labrador, 1 April 1956 – 1 April 1966

- 323d Fighter-Interceptor Squadron

Ernest Harmon AFB, Newfoundland, 6 June 1960 – 1 July 1960

- 640th Aircraft Control and Warning Squadron

Stephenville Air Station, Newfoundland, 1 June 1960 – 1 April 1966

- 641st Aircraft Control and Warning Squadron

Melville AS, Labrador, 1 April 1960 – 1 April 1966

- 642d Aircraft Control and Warning Squadron

Red Cliff AS, Newfoundland, 1 June 1960 – 1 October 1961

- 920th Aircraft Control and Warning Squadron

Resolution Island AS, Northern Territories, 1 April 1960 – 1 October 1961

- 921st Aircraft Control and Warning Squadron

Saint Anthony AS, Newfoundland, 1 April 1960 – 1 April 1966

- 922d Aircraft Control and Warning Squadron

Cartwright AS, Labrador, 1 April 1960 – 1 April 1966

- 923d Aircraft Control and Warning Squadron

Hopedale AS, Labrador, 1 April 1960 – 1 April 1966

- 924th Aircraft Control and Warning Squadron

Saglek AS, Labrador, 1 April 1960 – 1 April 1966

- 926th Aircraft Control and Warning Squadron

Frobisher Bay Air Base, Northwest Territories, 1 April 1960 – 1 November 1961

=== Stations ===
- Goose Bay AFB, Labrador, Canada, 1 April 1960 – 1 April 1966

=== Aircraft ===
- F-89J 1960
- F-102A 1960-1966
