= 64th Air Division =

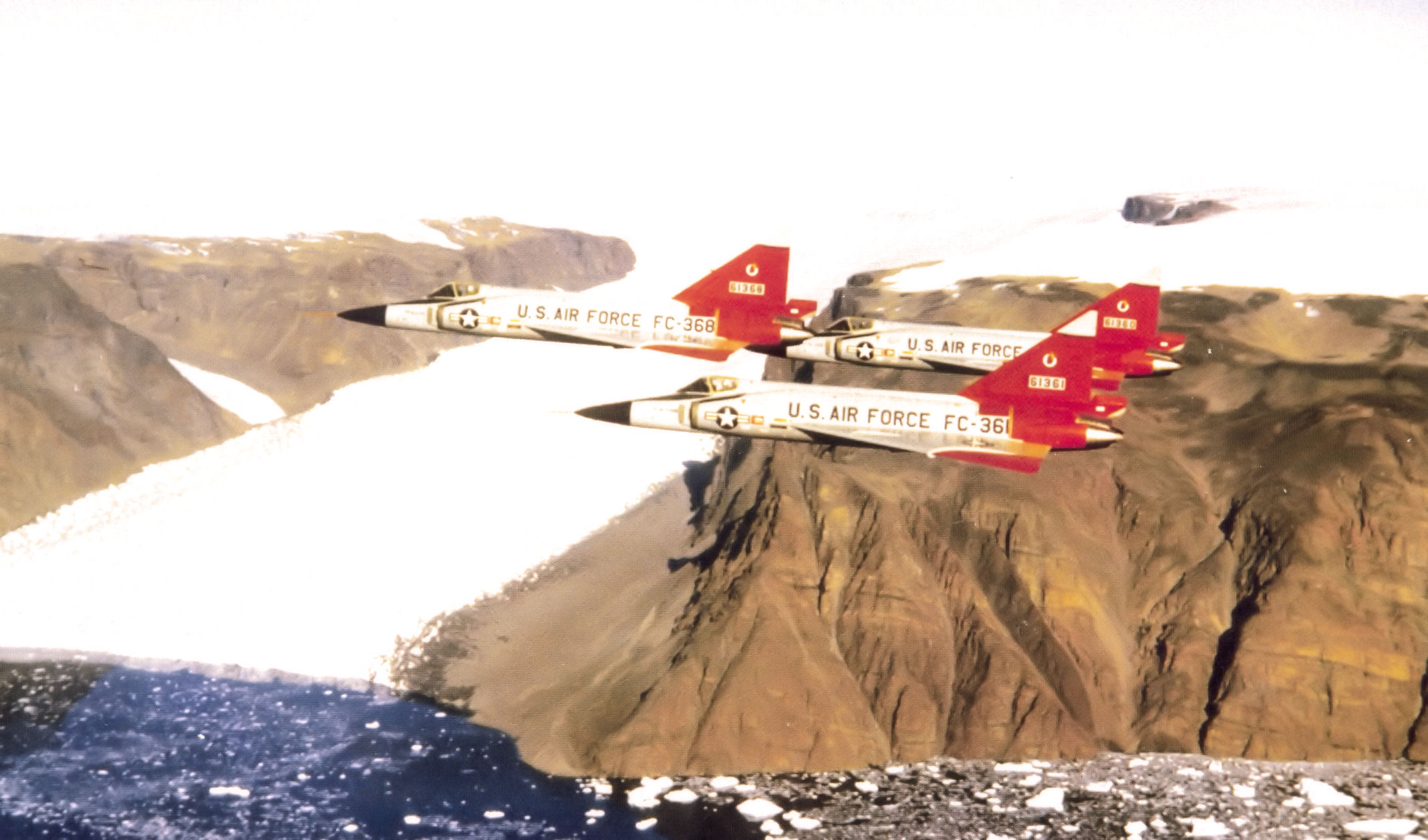
- 327th Fighter-Interceptor Squadron F-102s (Note: Aircraft are Convair F-102A-75-CO Delta Daggers Serials 56-1368, 56-1360, 56-1361. 1360 was converted to a PQM-102 target drone and was shot down on 8 March 1977 over the White Sands Missile Range; 1361 was retired to the Military Aircraft Storage and Disposition Center 2 June 1971 and on 21 March 1985 was shipped to Nellis Air Force Base for use as a target; 1368 is now on static display at the Evergreen Aviation & Space Museum, McMinnville, Oregon. Dirkx, Marco (23 September 2025). "1956 USAF Serial Numbers". Joe Baugher’s Serial Number List.)
- Active: 1942–1947; 1952–1963
- Country: United States
- Branch: United States Air Force
- Role: Command of air defense forces
- Motto: Mors Semper Tyrannus (Latin for 'Death Always to Tyrants') (World War II)
- Engagements: Mediterranean Theater of Operations; European Theater of Operations

Commanders
- Notable commanders: Glenn O. Barcus; Carroll W. McColpin

Insignia
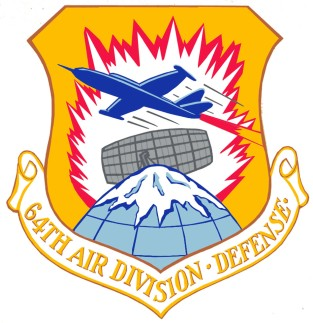
- 64th Air Division emblem (Note: Approved 8 August 1952. Description: Or, issuing from base a demi-sphere with line markings, snow capped, surmounted with a radar antenna, proper; in front of a representation of the Aurora Borealis argent, edges gules, in chief, surmounting the Aurora Borealis a stylized aircraft azure, in bend, with trailing flames proper. Maurer, p. 402.)

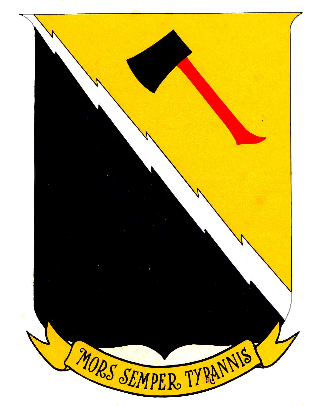
- 64th Fighter Wing emblem

The 64th Air Division is an inactive United States Air Force organization. Its last assignment was with Air Defense Command at Stewart Air Force Base, New York, where it was inactivated on 1 July 1963.

The division was first activated as the 3rd Air Defense Wing in December 1942. After a brief period of organization, it moved to North Africa in February 1943, where it served as an element of Twelfth Air Force, directing air defense and tactical units. The wing added fighter and fighter-bomber forces in the spring of 1943 and was redesignated the 64th Fighter Wing in July. During wing operations in North Africa, Italy and France, it pioneered methods to provide close air support to ground forces. In August 1944, it moved to France, continuing operations in France and Germany until V-E Day. It remained in Germany as part of the occupation forces until inactivating in June 1947.

In April 1952, it was activated in Newfoundland as the 64th Air Division, where it controlled air defense forces in the North Atlantic and Arctic. In July 1960, it moved from Pepperrell Air Force Base, Newfoundland to Stewart, transferring operational control of most units to its Goose Air Defense Sector, but expanding its management control to include the Distant Early Warning Line, the Pinetree Line and air defense of Iceland.

== History ==
=== World War II ===
==== Initial organization and training ====
The division was first activated at Mitchel Field, New York as the 3rd Air Defense Wing in December 1942. It drew its initial cadre from the Boston, Los Angeles, New York, Philadelphia, San Diego, and San Francisco Air Defense Wings. After a short period of organization and training, the wing departed the United States aboard the MV Sloterdijk on 7 February 1943, arriving in Algeria on 22 February.

==== North African campaign ====
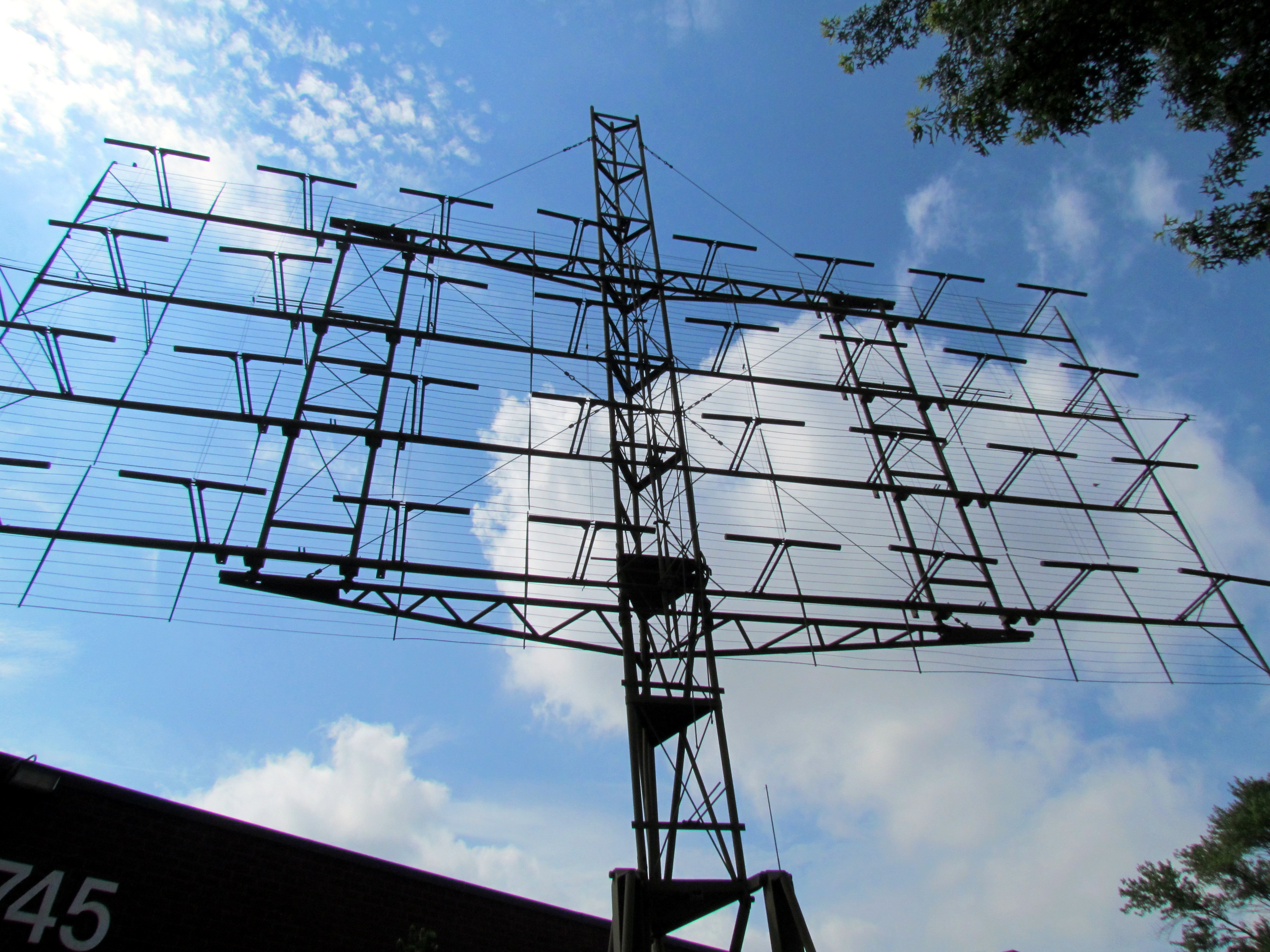
SCR-270 radar antenna as used by the wing

The wing's initial mission was air defense of Algiers from Oran Es Sénia Airport under XII Fighter Command. However, this mission was already in the hands of the Royal Air Force (RAF), and within a few days, the wing moved to Thelepte Airfield, Tunisia, where it became part of XII Air Support Command. At Thelepte, the 561st Signal Aircraft Warning Battalion and three independent signal warning companies were assigned to the wing. These units, which had been operating independently, were organized into a provisional battalion for unified control. This arrangement became more regular in July 1943, when the aircraft warning unit was renamed the 2691st Signal Aircraft Warning Battalion (Provisional)(Mobile). These units provided radar coverage over the combat zone and warning of German attacks for installations to the rear. The wing's 82nd Fighter Control Squadron directed strike aircraft and provided radio direction finding for aircraft returning to base. Attached RAF units also provided information from visual observation points near the front lines and from intelligence units monitoring Luftwaffe communications. (Note: This support continued through the Italian and French campaigns. In North Africa, it apparently included a source who was a Luftwaffe pilot breaking radio silence intentionally to provide information about his unit. Campbell et al., p. 14.) The wing occasionally augmented the operations section of XII Air Support Command in the Tunisian campaign.

==== Invasion of Sicily ====
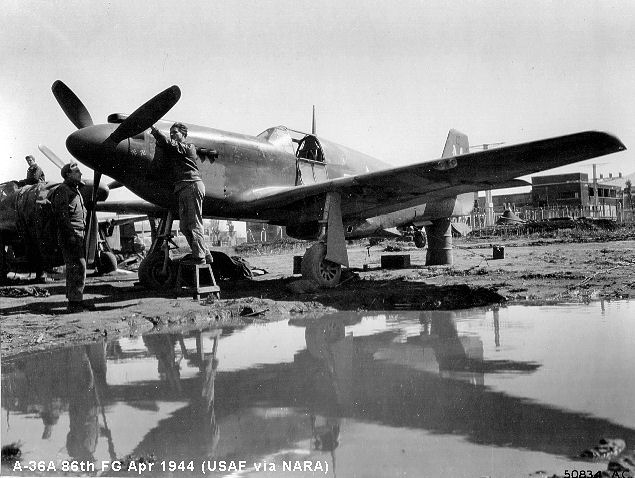
A-36 of the 86th Fighter-Bomber Group

In early July 1943, the wing embarked elements aboard the USS Monrovia, USS Ancon (AGC-4), USS Chase and USS Biscayne. From these ships, wing controllers directed fighters defending the fleet in Operation Husky, the invasion of Sicily, and the fighter-bombers providing air support to the landing forces. During this operation, the wing operated as XII Air Support Command, Advanced, operating to maintain air superiority and providing reconnaissance support for I Armored Corps. For these operations, fighter and reconnaissance units began being assigned to the wing. The 111th Reconnaissance Squadron: was attached to the wing in June 1943, and the 31st and 33d Fighter Groups and 86th Fighter-Bomber Group were assigned in July.

Wing elements landed near Gela with advanced elements, and set up two radar sites on the island. On shore radar operations ceased on 10 July, when wing personnel were pressed to act as infantry to help repel a German counterattack. Operations resumed on 13 July. On 12 July, wing headquarters moved to Gela, and took over control from the elements aboard the Monrovia and its sister ships. In the middle of the month, the wing's fighter and reconnaissance units moved to Sicily from North Africa. Recognizing the changed mission of the wing with the addition of tactical groups, it was redesignated the 64th Fighter Wing in late July.

In Sicily, the wing inaugurated a more efficient system of communication with ground units needing air support. Previously, such request followed the ground force chain of command upward and the air force chain of command downward before being implemented. The wing established liaison teams of operations and intelligence officers with each division, who could transmit requests for support directly to wing headquarters through a special radio net. While still clumsy compared to later systems it was an improvement over previous systems.

==== Italian campaign ====
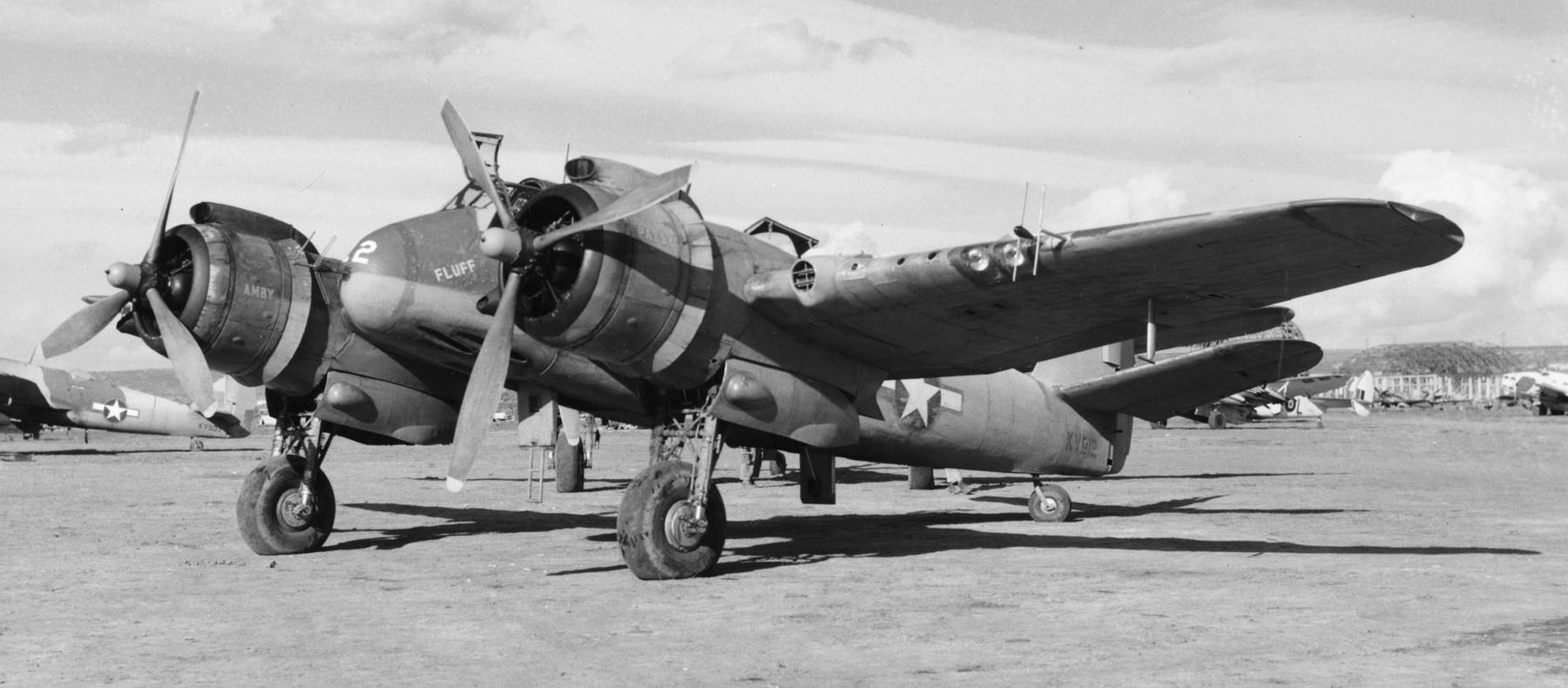
415th Night Fighter Squadron Bristol Beaufighter

At the beginning of September 1943, the wing moved to Milazzo Airfield, Sicily, from which it would be able to support Operation Avalanche, the invasion of Italy near Salerno. From this location, it was also able to handle air-sea rescue operations for aircraft on missions to mainland Italy. Elements of the wing disembarked at Salerno on 9 September and by that evening were able to provide warning of enemy air attacks. An experiment with the use of aircraft VHF radios modified for ground use led to the deployment of controllers in jeeps with radios mounted on them to control attacking aircraft. However, landline communications with ground forces were still required. With this system, fighter-bombers could be launched to receive their targets once they were near the battle area. However, limitations on the system still required a majority of strikes to be against targets determined before takeoff. More offensive missions were being controlled, and strikes nearer the front lines were possible. The addition of the 415th Night Fighter Squadron to the wing permitted interceptions against night raids.

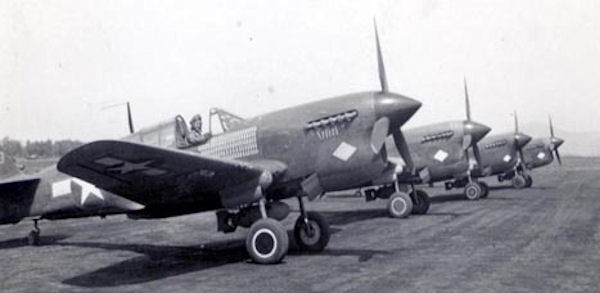
324th Fighter Group P-40 Warhawks

In January 1944, during Operation Shingle, the landings at Anzio, an element of the wing aboard HMS Ulster Queen directed American fighters defending the landing forces. By 24 January, the wing had established a control unit near the Villa Borghese Prior to this operation, air support missions, as a safety measure, were conducted across a bomb safety line, typically five to ten miles ahead of the front lines. With the aid of a wing detachment located with VI Corps headquarters and a radio equipped halftrack near the front lines, Curtiss P-40 Warhawks of the 324th Fighter Group conducted strikes against enemy strong points close to friendly troops. This system proved particularly effective against transportation, and the wing claimed the destruction of thousands of enemy vehicles during the Anzio campaign. In March, officers of Ninth Air Force, which was preparing for the invasion of Normandy, visited the wing for briefings on the system of air-ground cooperation the wing had developed in North Africa and Italy.

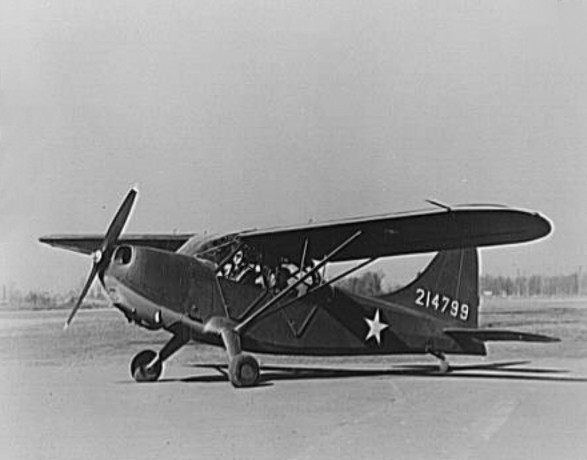
Stinson L-5 Sentinel on the ground in 1943

In June 1944, the wing experimented with the use of Piper L-4 Grasshoppers with observers from the 1st Armored Division aboard to control strikes. Later using Stinson L-5 Sentinels and flying low and typically within ten to twenty miles of the battle line, these light planes could identify targets and call fighter bombers to strike them. When needed, they could also point out targets to the strike aircraft. Similarly, tactical reconnaissance aircraft flew further to the rear and radioed wing controllers, who could direct strikes. These were usually transportation targets, trains or trucks.

During the Italian campaign, wing fighter and fighter-bombers supported ground forces in a wide range of operations that included cover patrols, battle-area patrols, escort missions, dive bombing missions, and reconnaissance. Primary targets included enemy gun positions, road junctions, traffic concentrations, assembly areas, bridges, and targets of opportunity.

==== Operations in France and Germany ====
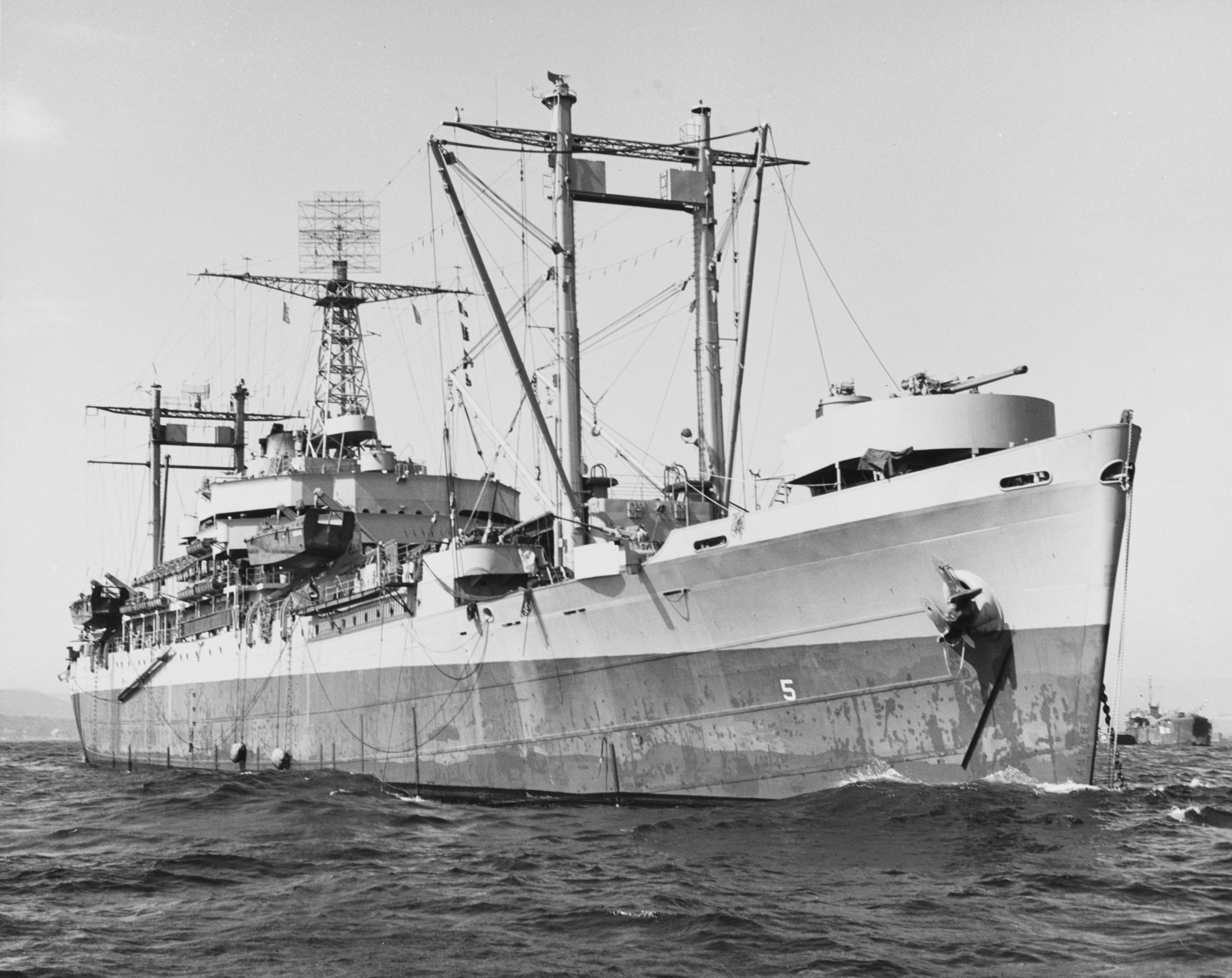
USS Catoctin during Operation Dragoon

On 19 July, the wing moved to the staging area at Santa Maria Capua Vetere, Italy and began preparation for Operation Dragoon, the invasion of southern France. A headquarters detachment went aboard the USS Catoctin, which would be the headquarters afloat for the invasion, while a control team went to Malta, where they trained aboard HMS Stuart Prince. The control ships for the landing would once again be the Ulster Queen, plus Fighter Director Tender 13 (FDT 13), an LST converted for fighter direction with a control room and two radars.

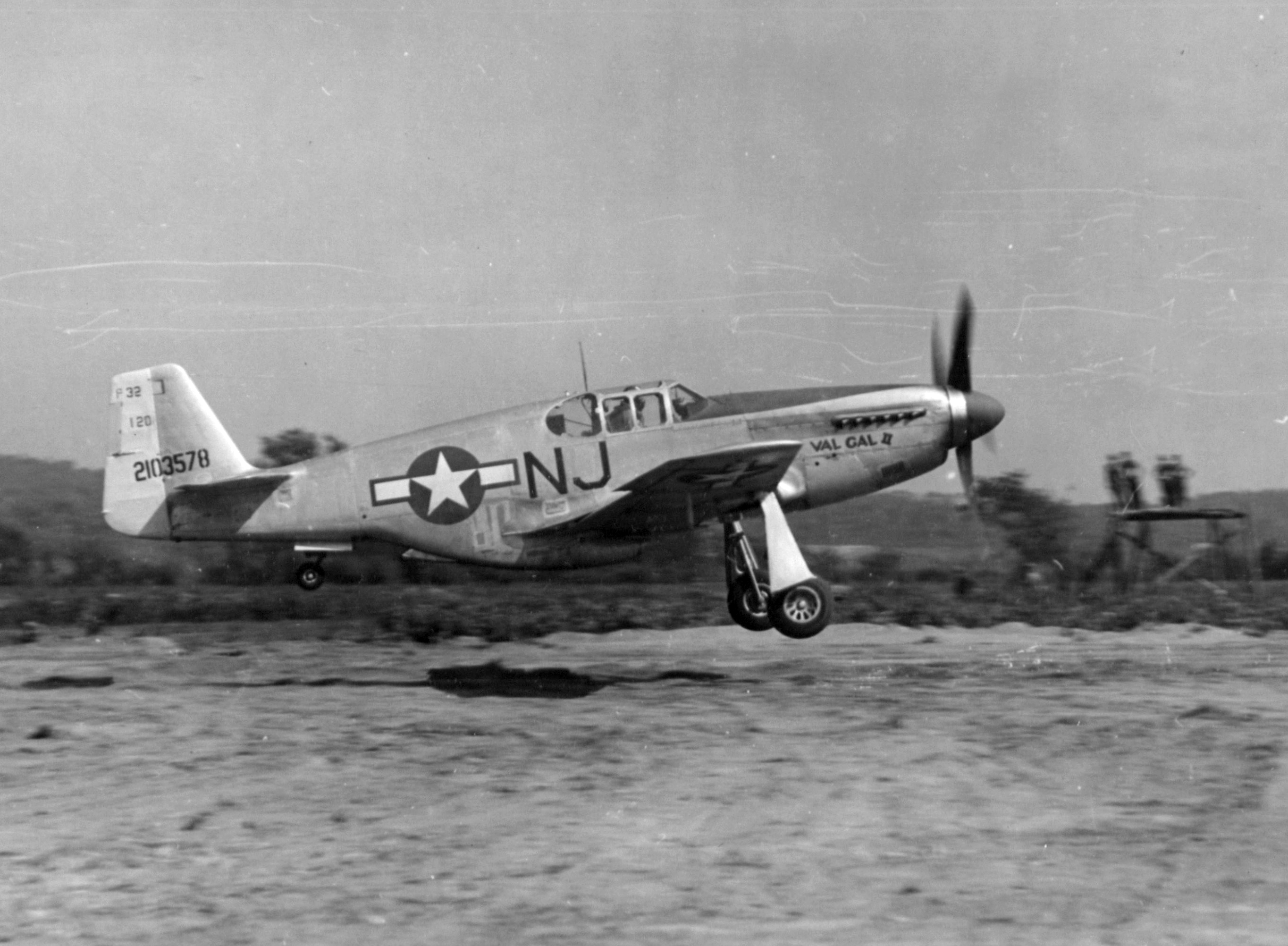
Wing F-6C Mustang tactical reconnaissance plane in southern France

On 15 August 1944 the landings began. Using techniques developed during the two previous invasions, wing personnel controlled air operations from FDT 13. This now included tactical reconnaissance aircraft patrolling the landing areas and reporting on potential targets. In addition, a control team from the 328th Fighter Control Squadron landed with the 550th Glider Infantry Battalion at Le Muy, operating with the advance elements of the airborne forces with a radio equipped Jeep. In addition to controlling fighter-bombers, this team also relayed reports by tactical reconnaissance planes to the airborne troops. For the first few days following the landings, this became the team's primary function. Light resistance in most landing areas permitted two control centers to land on D-Day, and wing headquarters was established near St Tropez, France the same day.

With the landing of troops, a beachhead control unit directed aircraft to hit enemy strong points, ammunition dumps, troop concentrations, road intersections, supply lines, and communications. As Allied forces advanced northward along the Rhone Valley, the wing implemented a plan to give more rapid support to the ground troops. Forward control units, equipped with the latest in air ground communications, were established with each division, strike aircraft could launch without a specific target, to be directed to whatever sector air support unit had identified a current target

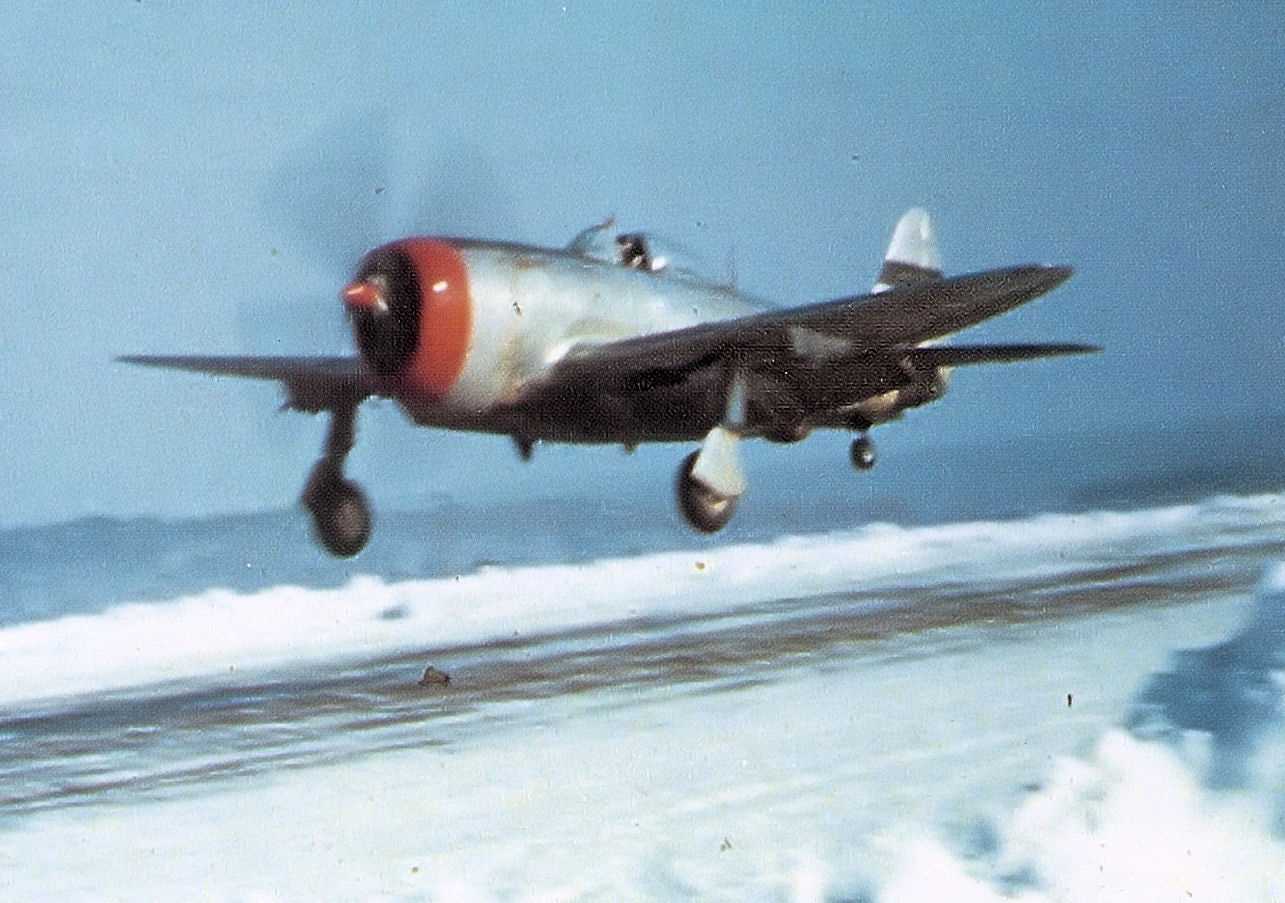
A wing P-47 Thunderbolt landing at Toul-Ochey Airfield

The Allies had not made plans for an air establishment to support Sixth Army Group, which was conducting the advance up the Rhone. Many of the air units that had been attached for Operation Dragoon had been withdrawn to their permanent commands. In October 1944, First Tactical Air Force (Provisional) (1 TAF) was established, although not on a permanent basis. Although the 64th Wing remained assigned to XII Tactical Air Command for administration, it would be attached to 1 TAF for operations for the remainer of the war. The wing commanded all American fighter forces in the command, (Note: The 71st Fighter Wing was also assigned, but it had no subordinate units and its personnel were used to man XII Tactical Air Command headquarters. Maurer, p. 406.) which, with the exception of the 415th Night Fighter Squadron, flew Republic P-47 Thunderbolts. Its control elements also controlled strikes by medium bombers of the 42nd Bombardment Wing and fighters and bombers of the Free French 1er Corps Aerien, using attached French controllers.

Due to bad weather during the winter of 1944-45, the wing developed a technique called "Eggbasket." Eggbasket targets were identified strongpoints. When fighters were unable to attack targets because clouds prevented them from identifying their targets, they would receive radar vectors to Eggbasket targets, and the controller would tell them when to drop their bombs. Additionally, a wing Ground-controlled interception (GCI) site provided "Popeye Letdown"s (Note: "Popeye" is a code word for flying in actual instrument conditions.) directing planes flying above an overcast to visual conditions below, using the site's radar. The wing's aircraft warning units began re-equipping with more advanced SCR-584 microwave radars. The first of the 593rd Battalion's radars went into operation on 10 April 1945 at a site combining both the warning functions of the battalion and the control functions of the fighter control squadrons. After providing training on systems operations and maintenance, by 1945, control teams operating with the French ground forces of Sixth Army Group were composed of French military personnel.

On 15 March 1945, Sixth Army Group attacked into Germany. Wing fighter-bombers flew as many as four sorties daily per plane, flying 943 sorties, 93% of which were close air support missions. This was more than 300 sorties over the previous high for the wing. The record only lasted a day, when the wing flew 974 sorties on the 16th, then flew 984 sorties on the 18th. The wing's 50th and 358th Fighter Groups each received a Distinguished Unit Citation (DUC) for their effective attacks isolating enemy troop formations and preventing their withdrawal during this operation. Although preceded by control teams, wing headquarters moved into Germany, and established itself at Edenkoben on 1 April. Shortly thereafter, the wing's fighter units began moving into Germany. Sortie numbers had dropped as the army advanced farther from their bases in France, extending time spent flying to and from targets.

Two combat commands of the 10th Armored Division outran their supply lines, and on 8 April 1945 were surrounded in Crailsheim by German forces. For the next two days, Douglas C-47 Skytrains of IX Troop Carrier Command provided emergency relief through an airfield within their perimeter. Wing fighter groups provided fighter cover for the transports, destroying at least a dozen German aircraft before the emergency airlift ended on the 10th. The 358th earned another DUC for this and following actions. In late April, the wing's 50th and 358th Groups destroyed 157 aircraft, including Me 262 jet fighters on the ground near Munich, earning the 50th another DUC. (Note: This attack was included in the award to the 358th previously mentioned.)

=== Occupation duty ===
The wing moved to Germany at the end of April 1945, establishing its headquarters at Schwäbisch Hall. After V-E Day, it served in the occupation of Germany, returning to the control of XII Tactical Air Command, when 1 TAF was discontinued in May 1945. The wing performed occupation duties such as destroying captured enemy aircraft, repairing roads, bridges and processing prisoners of war. For brief periods through 1946, it also commanded units which were inactivating or returning to the United States.

The 415th Night Fighter Squadron returned to the United States in February 1946. The 417th Night Fighter Squadron converted to the newer and more capable Northrop P-61 Black Widow. When it was joined by the 416th Night Fighter Squadron in August 1946, both squadrons were attached to the All-Weather Group (Provisonal), 64th Fighter Wing. In November 1946, both squadrons were inactivated when the 52d Fighter-All Weather Group was activated to assume the air defense mission in Germany.

In August 1946, the 27th Fighter Group replaced the 366th Fighter Group at AAF Station Fritzlar. During 1946 and 1947, two liaison squadrons were assigned to the wing. These squadrons maintained detachments at various locations in Germany and Austria, and their mission included supporting the United States Constabulary. The wing was inactivated in Germany on 5 June 1947.

=== Cold War air defense ===
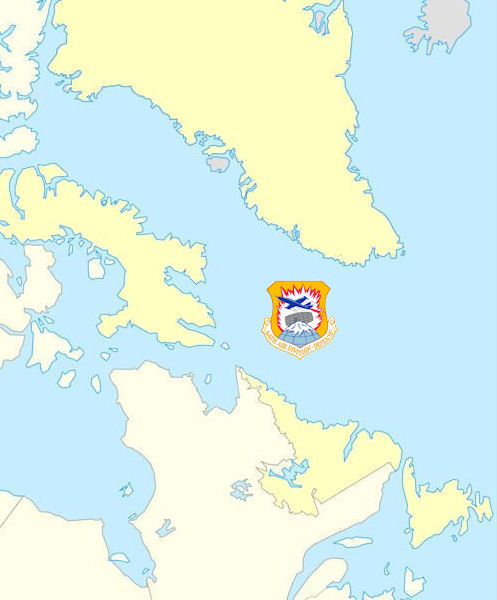
64th Air Division Area of Responsibility 1952-1960

The wing was redesignated the 64th Air Division and activated at Pepperrell Air Force Base, Newfoundland in April 1952. It was assigned to Northeast Air Command (NEAC) and was assigned the 152nd Aircraft Control and Warning Group, an Air National Guard (ANG) unit that had been mobilized for the Korean War. The 152nd had arrived in NEAC's area of responsibility in the spring of 1952 and its squadrons were establishing radar coverage of northeastern Canada and Greenland. By the summer of 1953, temporary stations had been established.

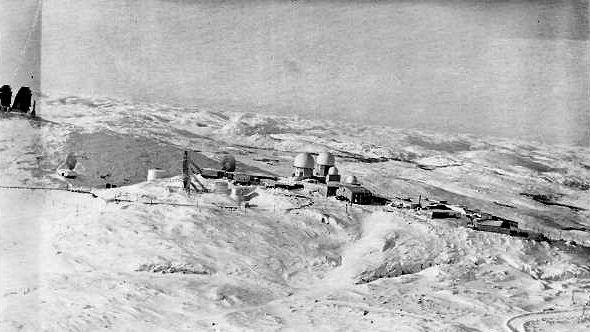
Radar station at Hopedale, Labrador

In late December 1952, the division was reorganized, The 152d Group was inactivated and its squadrons at Harmon Air Force Base, McAndrew Air Force Base, and Red Cliff Air Station, Newfoundland; Goose Bay Airport, Labrador and Thule Air Base, Greenland were assigned directly to division headquarters, with the exception of the 106th Air Control Squadron, which was also inactivated with its mission and equipment being absorbed into the division, which changed organizationally to a "table of distribution" unit. The following August, the division's three ANG squadrons were inactivated and their mission, personnel and equipment transferred to newly-activated regular squadrons.

During 1953, additional sites at Saint Anthony Air Station, Newfoundland; Cartwright Air Station, Hopedale Air Station, and Saglek Bay Air Station Labrador; and Frobisher Bay Air Base, Northwest Territories had begun operation. By June 1954, all permanent sites were completed, with the exception of the site on Resolution Island, Northwest Territories, which began operations in November. The 931st Aircraft Control and Warning Squadron at Thule Air Base, Greenland also had two detachments operating from sites on Greenland's ice cap.

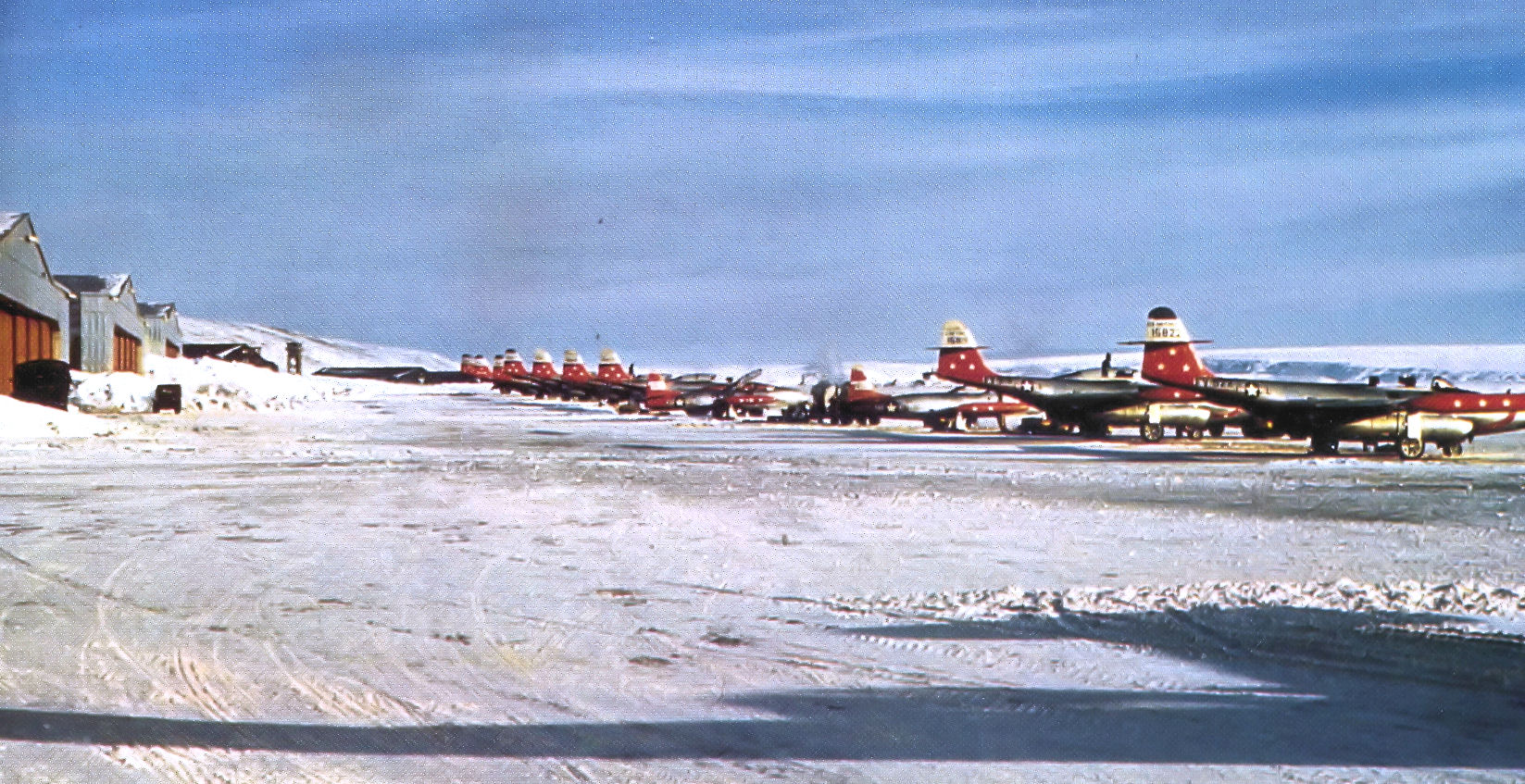
F-89 Scorpions of the 74th Fighter-Interceptor Squadron at Thule

The first interceptors assigned to the division arrived in September 1952, when the 59th Fighter-Interceptor Squadron established a detachment of four Lockheed F-94 Starfires at Thule. The squadron moved to Goose Bay the following month and began standing 24 hour alert in December. The summer of 1953 saw more F-94s arrive; those of the 318th Fighter-Interceptor Squadron at Thule (Note: With the arrival of the 318th, the detachment of the 59th was discontinued and returned to join the rest of the squadron. Buss.) in July and those of the 61st Fighter-Interceptor Squadron at Ernest Harmon Air Force Base in August. The 61st upgraded to Northrop F-89 Scorpions in 1954.

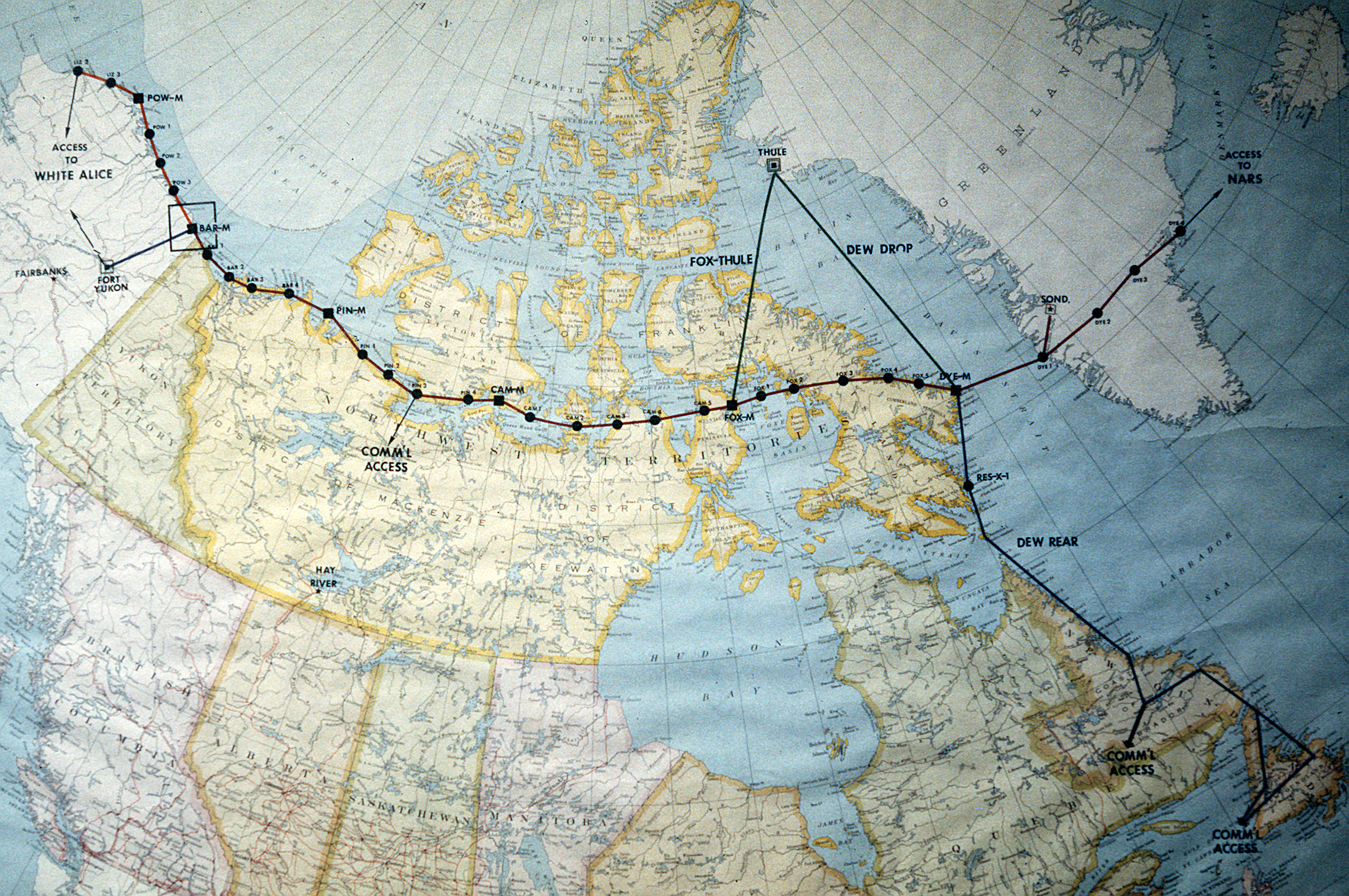
Map of the DEW Line

In 1956, the Joint Chiefs of Staff implemented the Unified Command Plan. Under this plan, responsibility for air defense of North America was given to the Continental Air Defense Command (CONAD). As CONAD implemented its expanded responsibility, NEAC was inactivated in April 1957, and its air defense mission was transferred to Air Defense Command (ADC). In this realignment, the 4737th Air Base Wing, the host unit at Pepperell, was assigned to the division until it was inactivated in May 1958 and the 4737th Air Base Group took over management of the base until 1960. The 4731st, 4732nd, 4733rd, and 4734th Air Defense Groups were organized and most of the division's fighter and radar units were assigned to them. The 4733rd Group, which had no fighter units assigned, was discontinued on 1 April 1958. Its radar squadrons were transferred to the other three groups, while its Distant Early Warning Line (DEW Line) support mission was transferred to the 4601st Support Group (DEW), which reported directly to ADC. The following month, the 4734th Group was discontinued and its squadrons returned to the direct control of the division.

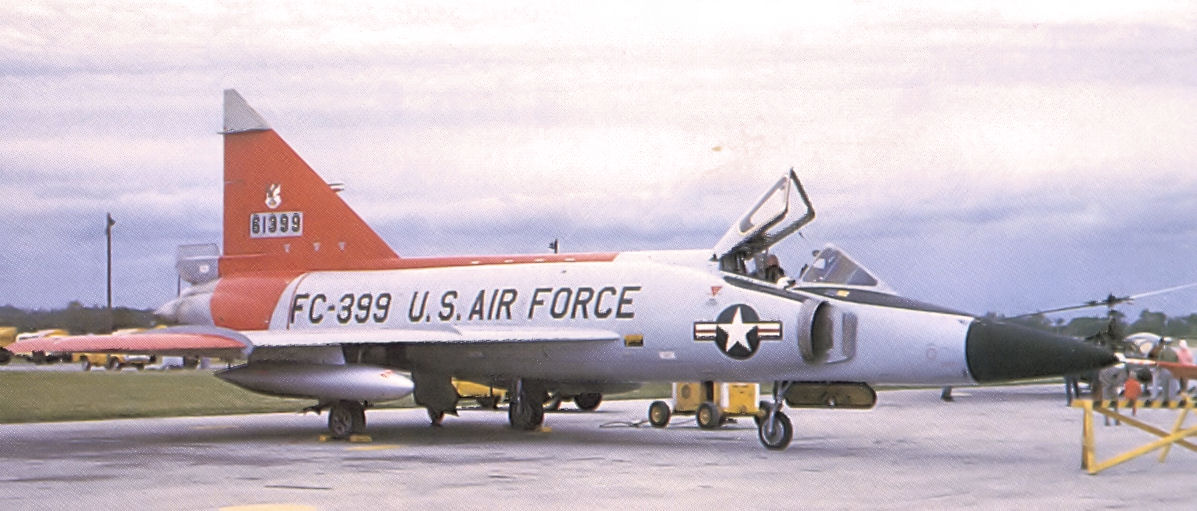
61st Fighter-Interceptor Squadron F-102 Delta Dagger (Note: Aircraft is Convair F-102A-75-CO Delta Dagger, serial 56-1399.)

In April 1960, the Goose Air Defense Sector was activated at Goose Air Force Base. The sector assumed operational control of most of the division's units. On 1 July 1960, the division headquarters moved from Newfoundland to Stewart Air Force Base, New York, and the same day, the 4683d Air Defense Wing was activated under the wing at Thule Air Base and the 4684th Air Base Group at Sondrestrom Air Base, as Strategic Air Command transferred its Greenland bases to ADC. In October, the 4601st Support Wing at Paramus, New Jersey, which managed support to the DEW Line was transferred from ADC headquarters to the division In January 1961, the 4602nd Support Wing. located at Ottawa, Ontario, Canada, also became part of the division. The 4602nd Wing was overseeing the transfer of radar stations of the Pinetree Line from ADC to the Royal Canadian Air Force's Air Defence Command.

On 1 July 1962, Air Forces Iceland at Keflavik Airport, Iceland, was assigned to the division when it was transferred from Military Air Transport Service to ADC. The Division was inactivated in July 1963. Most of its units were transferred to the 26th Air Division, Goose Air Defense Sector, or the 4601st Support Wing,

== Lineage ==
- Established as the 3d Air Defense Wing on 12 December 1942

Activated on 12 December 1942
Redesignated 64th Fighter Wing on 24 July 1943
Inactivated on 5 June 1947

- Redesignated 64th Air Division (Defense) on 17 March 1952

Activated on 8 April 1952
Inactivated on 20 December 1952

- Organized on 20 December 1952 (Note: The simultaneous inactivation and organization on 20 December 1952 represents a change between a Table of Organization and a Table of Distribution unit.)

Discontinued and inactivated, on 1 July 1963

=== Assignments ===
- I Fighter Command, 12 December 1942-c. 7 February 1943
- Army Service Forces, Port of Embarkation, c. 7 February 1943
- XII Fighter Command, 22 February 1943
- XII Air Support Command (later XII Tactical Air Command), 9 March 1943 – 5 June 1947 (attached to First Tactical Air Force (Provisional), 27 November 1944 – c. 21 May 1945)
- Northeast Air Command, 8 April 1952
- Air Defense Command, 1 April 1957 – 1 July 1963

=== Stations ===
- Mitchel Field, New York, 12 December 1942 – 23 January 1943
- Oran Es Sénia Airport, Algeria, 22 February 1943
- Thelepte Airfield, Tunisia, 1 March 1943
- Sbeitla, Tunisia, 18 March 1943
- Le Sers Airfield, Tunisia, 12 April 1943
- Korba Airfield, Tunisia, 18 May 1943
- Gela, Sicily, Italy, 12 July 1943
- Milazzo Airfield, Sicily, Italy, 1 September 1943
- Frattamaggiore, Italy, 7 October 1943 (Note: Campbell states that wing headquarters were established near the Montecorvino Airfield on 11 September, then moved to Frattamaggiore in October.)
- San Felice Circeo, Italy, 1 June 1944
- Rocca di Papa, Italy, 7 June 1944
- Orbetello, Italy 19 June 1944 (Note: Maurer does not list the two previous stations and dates the move to Orbetello as taking place on 1 June. Maurer, p. 402.)
- Santa Maria Capua Vetere, Italy 19 July 1944
- St Tropez, France, 15 August 1944
- Nancy, France (Dôle-Tavaux Airport) (Y-7), 19 September 1944
- Ludres, France, 3 November 1944
- Toul/Ochey Airfield (A-96), France, 15 January 1945
- Edenkoben, Germany, 1 April 1945
- Schwäbisch Hall (R-41), Germany, 29 April 1945
- AAF Station Darmstadt/Griesheim (Y-76), Germany, 7 July 1945
- AAF Station Bad Kissingen (R-98), Germany, 1 December 1945 – 5 June 1947
- Pepperrell Air Force Base, Newfoundland, 20 December 1952
- Stewart Air Force Base, New York, 1 July 1960 – 1 July 1963

=== Components ===
==== World War II ====
===== Groups =====
- Provisional Reconnaissance Group: c. 20 October 1944 – c. 21 May 1945
- All-Weather Group (Provisional), 64th Fighter Wing: c. 15 August – 9 November 1946
- 27th Fighter-Bomber Group (later 27 Fighter Group): 7 July – c. 20 October 1945; 20 August 1946 – 5 June 1947 (Note: The 64th Air Division fact sheet gives the World War dates as c. 28 May 1943 – c. 22 October 1945, however only the listed dates agree with the Wing History and Haulman, Factsheet.)
- 31st Fighter Group: 24 July 1943 – 1 April 1944
- 33rd Fighter Group: assigned 24 July 1943, attached 21 December 1943 – 14 February 1944
- 50th Fighter Group: 29 September 1944 – 22 June 1945
- 52d Fighter Group: 9 November 1946 – 15 May 1947
- 69th Tactical Reconnaissance Group: 27 March – 30 June 1945
- 79th Fighter Group: attached 18 January – 10 February 1944, 27 February – 20 April 1944, 20–30 September 1944
- 86th Fighter-Bomber Group (later 86th Fighter Group): Assigned c. 31 July – c. 1 December 1943, attached 20 February – c. 30 April 1945, August 1945 – 15 February 1946; assigned 20 August 1946 – 1 March 1947
- 324th Fighter Group: 22 August 1943 – c. 5 March 1944; 30 April – 14 August 1945
- 354th Fighter Group: 4 July 1945 – 15 February 1946
- 355th Fighter Group: c. 15 April – 1 August 1946
- 358th Fighter Group: c. 30 May – 18 July 1945
- 363d Reconnaissance Group: 18 May – 15 November 1945
- 366th Fighter Group: 4 July 1945 – 20 August 1946
- 370th Fighter Group: 27 June – 17 September 1945
- 404th Fighter Group: 23 June – 2 August 1945
- 406th Fighter Group: 5 August 1945 – 20 August 1946

===== Squadrons =====
- 14th Liaison Squadron: 10 July 1946 – 1 May 1947 (attached to United States Constabulary)
- 20th Communications Squadron: See 349th Signal Company
- 47th Liaison Squadron: 4 March 1946 – 1 May 1947
- 82nd Fighter Control Squadron, c. July 1943 – c. 10 October 1945
- 111th Reconnaissance Squadron: attached June – September 1943
- 155th Photographic Reconnaissance Squadron: 1 August – 24 November 1945
- 328th Fighter Control Squadron: attached c. 19 January 1944 – c. 27 December 1945
- 415th Night Fighter Squadron: attached c. 3 September – 5 December 1943, assigned 5 December 1943 – 15 February 1946 (attached to 87th Fighter Wing c. 3 July – c. 5 August 1944, detachment attached to No. 600 Squadron, RAF, 23 July – 5 August 1944)
- 416th Night Fighter Squadron: 15 August – 9 November 1946 (attached to All-Weather Group (Provisonal), 64th Fighter Wing)
- 417th Night Fighter Squadron: 24 March – 17 May 1945; 26 June 1945 – 9 November 1946 (attached to All-Weather Group (Provisonal), 64th Fighter Wing after 15 August 1946)

===== Battalions =====
- Signal Aircraft Warning Battalion (Provisional) (later 2691st Signal Aircraft Warning Battalion (Provisional) (Mobile)): attached 1 March 1943 – 1943, 31 July 1943 – 15 January 1944
- 439th Signal Construction Battalion, Aviation: 19 September 1943 – c. 1945
- 582nd Signal Aircraft Warning Battalion: 15 January 1944 – 1945
- 593rd Signal Aircraft Warning Battalion: 10 March 1944 – c. 1945

===== Other =====
- 346th Signal Company, Wing (later 20th Communications Squadron, Wing): 21 April 1944 – c. 5 June 1947
- 90th Wireless Observer Unit (RAF): attached 1943 – 1944

==== Cold War ====
===== Force =====
- Air Forces Iceland, 1 July 1962 – 1 July 1963

===== Sector =====
- Goose Air Defense Sector, 1 April 1960 – 1 July 1963

===== Wings =====
- 4601st Support Wing, 1 October 1960 – 1 July 1963
- 4602d Support Wing, 1 January 1961 – 1 July 1963
- 4683d Air Defense Wing, 1 July 1960 – 1 July 1963
- 4737th Air Base Wing, 1 April 1957 – 1 May 1958

===== Groups =====
- 152nd Aircraft Control and Warning Group, 8 April 1952 – 20 December 1952
- 4684th Air Base Group, 1 July 1960 – 1 July 1963
- 4737th Air Base Group, 1 May 1958 – 1 September 1960
- 4731st Air Defense Group, 1 April 1957 – 1 July 1960
- 4732d Air Defense Group, 1 April 1957 – 1 July 1960
- 4733d Air Defense Group, 1 April 1957 – 1 May 1958
- 4734th Air Defense Group, 1 April 1957 – 1 May 1958

===== Squadrons =====
- 59th Fighter-Interceptor Squadron, attached 1 November 1952, assigned 1 February 1953 – 1 April 1957
- 61st Fighter-Interceptor Squadron, 6 August 1953 – 1 April 1957
- 74th Fighter-Interceptor Squadron, 21 August 1954 – 1 April 1957, 1 May 1958 – 25 July 1958
- 105th Aircraft Control and Warning Squadron, 20 December 1952 – 1 August 1953
- 107th Aircraft Control and Warning Squadron, 20 December 1952 – 1 August 1953
- 108th Aircraft Control and Warning Squadron, 20 December 1952 – 1 August 1953
- 318th Fighter-Interceptor Squadron, 1 July 1953 – 8 August 1954
- 327th Fighter-Interceptor Squadron, 3 July 1958 – 25 March 1960
- 639th Aircraft Control and Warning Squadron, 15 November 1958 – 1 April 1959
- 640th Aircraft Control and Warning Squadron, 1 August 1953 – 6 June 1960
- 641st Aircraft Control and Warning Squadron, 1 August 1953 – 6 June 1960
- 642d Aircraft Control and Warning Squadron, 1 August 1953 – 6 June 1960
- 920th Aircraft Control and Warning Squadron, 1 August 1953 – 1 April 1957
- 921st Aircraft Control and Warning Squadron, 1 October 1953 – 1 April 1957
- 922d Aircraft Control and Warning Squadron, 1 October 1953 – 1 April 1957
- 923d Aircraft Control and Warning Squadron, 1 November 1953 – 1 April 1957
- 924th Aircraft Control and Warning Squadron, 10 December 1953 – 1 April 1957
- 926th Aircraft Control and Warning Squadron, 1 December 1953 – 1 April 1957
- 931st Aircraft Control and Warning Squadron, 8 November 1952 – 1 April 1957, 1 May 1958 – 1 July 1960

=== Campaigns ===
Campaign Streamer	Campaign	Dates	Notes
	Tunisia	22 February 1943 – 13 May 1943	2nd Air Defense Wing
	Sicily	14 May 1943 – 17 August 1943	2nd Air Defense Wing(later 64th Fighter Wing)
	Naples-Foggia	18 August 1943 – 21 January 1944	64th Fighter Wing
	Anzio	22 January 1944 – 24 May 1944	64th Fighter Wing
	Rome-Arno	22 January 1944 – 9 September 1944	64th Fighter Wing
	Southern France	15 August 1944 – 14 September 1944	64th Fighter Wing
	Rhineland	15 September 1944 – 21 March 1945	64th Fighter Wing
	Ardennes-Alsace	16 December 1944 – 25 January 1945	64th Fighter Wing
	Central Europe	22 March 1944 – 21 May 1945	64th Fighter Wing
	World War II Army of Occupation (Germany)	9 May 1945 – 5 June 1947	64th Fighter Wing

== See also ==
- List of United States Air Force air divisions
- Aerospace Defense Command Fighter Squadrons
- List of USAF Aerospace Defense Command General Surveillance Radar Stations
