= Northeast Air Command =

Former U.S. Air Force major command

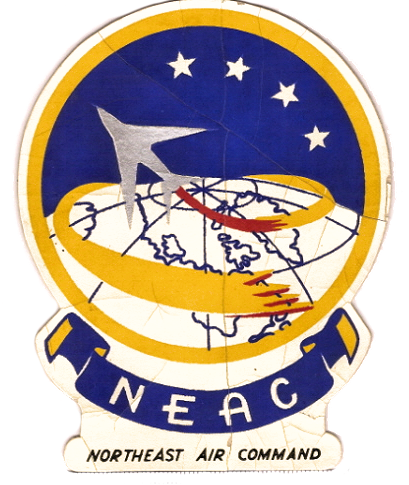
- Northeast Air Command Emblem
- Active: 1950–1957
- Country: United States
- Branch: United States Air Force
- Type: Major Command (1950–1957)
- Garrison/HQ: Pepperrell Air Force Base, St John's, Newfoundland and Labrador

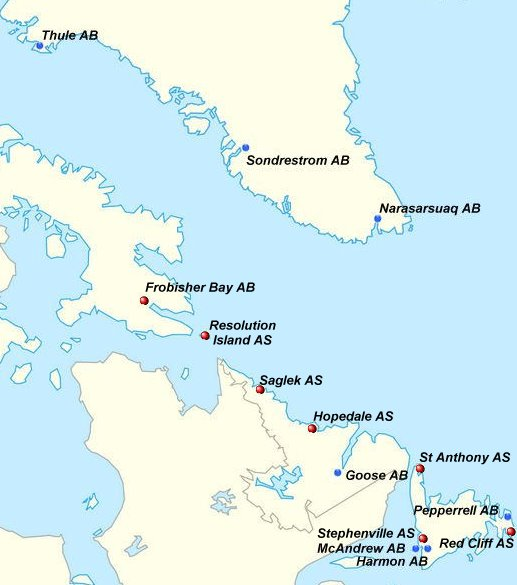
Northeast Air Command area showing major Air Bases

Northeast Air Command (NEAC) was a Major Command of the United States Air Force, responsible for the operation and defense of air bases in Greenland, Labrador, and Newfoundland. It was formed in 1950 from the facilities of the United States established during World War II in eastern Canada, Newfoundland and Greenland. It was discontinued in 1957.

== History ==
=== Origins ===
Northeast Air Command (NEAC) was originally formed from the World War II facilities of the United States Army Newfoundland Base Command (NBC), which formed on 15 January 1941. The NBC was formed to command bases in Newfoundland which came under United States control as a result of the 1940 Destroyers for Bases Agreement; the 1941 US-Danish Agreement on Greenland, and the development by Air Transport Command of airfields in the Canadian Northwest Territories and Greenland to support aircraft ferry routes to Great Britain.

==== Newfoundland Base Command ====
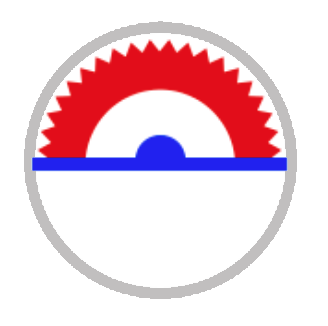
Emblem of the Newfoundland Base Command

In the summer of 1940, President Roosevelt began negotiating with British Ambassador to the United States, Lord Lothian for the American lease of British bases, the "rental" to take the form of fifty over-age destroyers. On 2 September 1940, the negotiations were completed. In exchange for the destroyers, the U. S. got ninety-nine-year leases for bases in Dominion of Newfoundland, Bermuda, British Guiana, Antigua, Trinidad, St. Lucia, Jamaica and the Bahamas. No destroyers, or any other war material, was leased to Britain in exchange for the bases in Newfoundland or Bermuda, which were vital both as links in Britain's trans-Atlantic air routes and to waging the Battle of the Atlantic against Germany's submarines. The detailed lease agreements were not signed until March 1941. But by that time, American troops were already in Newfoundland.

The first United States troops arrived in Newfoundland on 29 January 1941. The first base occupied was a temporary tent camp near St. John's called Camp Alexander. Nearby Fort Pepperrell (renamed Pepperrell Air Force Base on 16 June 1949) received its first troops in November 1941. Newfoundland Base Command (NBC) was assigned to the Northeastern (later Eastern) Defense Command, a subordinate continental defense command of First United States Army, whose area included the east coast of the United States, with both commanded by Lt. General Hugh A. Drum, based at Fort Jay in New York City. In December 1941 the Northeastern Defense Command became the Eastern Theater of Operations (ETO) and assumed First Army's role in continental defense. In March 1942 the ETO was renamed the Eastern Defense Command. The NBC was under the direct control of US Army General Headquarters for U.S. Troops in Newfoundland in the defense of the northeastern seaboard through First Army/Eastern Defense Command. The Base Command was responsible for its own supply, which was to be provided by the Second Corps Area, the service of supply organization also headquartered at Fort Jay, to the same extent as for units of the field forces.

NBC provided ground, antiaircraft, and harbor defense of U.S. bases in Newfoundland and Labrador, to work with Canada in defending Newfoundland, and to cooperate with the United States Navy in Newfoundland defense. Newfoundland Base Command was headquartered at Fort Pepperrell, St. John's, Newfoundland. Another major base was Naval Station Argentia.

The first USAAF presence in Newfoundland was in May 1941 when six B-18 Bolos from the First Air Force 21st Reconnaissance Squadron arrived at RCAF Station Gander. Later, the Army Air Forces Antisubmarine Command (AAFAC) used both Gander and RCAF Station Torbay near St. John's for antisubmarine patrols over the North Atlantic and to provide convoy overflights over the shipping lanes, patrolling for U-boats. Both Canada and the United States built radar stations in Newfoundland. Beginning in the spring of 1944, the American stations were phased over to the RCAF so that American personnel could be moved to more active theaters.

==== Greenland Base Command ====
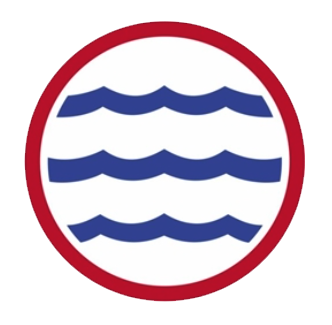
Emblem of the Greenland Base Command

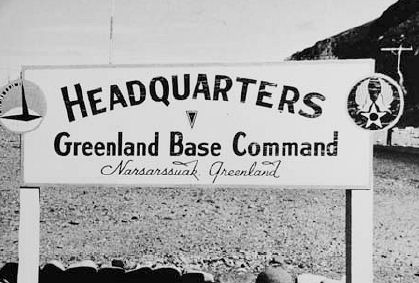
Greenland Base Command HQ Sign, about 1943

While the exchange of destroyers for a string of Atlantic bases was under negotiation, and then, while plans and preparations for developing the new bases were getting under way, the United Kingdom and Canada were consolidating their position in the North Atlantic by stationing troops in Iceland and were attempting to counter German activities in Greenland.

With United States bases were under construction in Newfoundland, a number of possible sites for airfields in Greenland were made in late 1940. Greenland being a Danish colony with Denmark under the occupation of Nazi Germany at the time. These surveys were made with the justification that the defense of the American bases in Newfoundland and of the northeastern United States would be affected by a German military air base in Greenland.

Neither the United States, nor Canada or the UK desired any Wehrmacht facilities or armed forces in Greenland to obtain weather data. During the summer of 1940 Nazi Germany had organized in Norway a number of expeditions for the purpose of establishing radio and weather stations in northeastern Greenland, in the neighborhood of Scoresby Sound. Although manned, it would seem, by Norwegians and Danes, and led by a Dane, these weather stations were under German control and were operated for the purpose of assisting the German naval and military effort. A mixed British-Norwegian landing party seized a supply of aviation gasoline, dismantled several radio stations, and took into custody a number of heavily armed Danish "hunters" found on the coast. This was in late August or early September 1940. A few weeks afterward the British intercepted another vessel off the coast of Greenland with about fifty Germans, some of them meteorologists, on board. All this activity at the top of the Western Hemisphere was a source of much concern to the United States.

In addition to seizing German ships and weather equipment on Greenland, the British and Canadians were planning on building air bases on the island to conduct antisubmarine warfare in the North Atlantic. Although the United States Government had acquiesced in the British garrisoning of Iceland, it had no desire to see Britain make the same move into Greenland; for Greenland was, unlike Iceland, definitely within the Western Hemisphere and within the scope of the Monroe Doctrine.

The Department of State reached an agreement on 9 April 1941 with Danish Foreign Minister, Henrik de Kauffmann, acting on behalf of His Majesty the King of Denmark in his capacity as sovereign of Greenland. The agreement recognized that as a result of the European war there was danger that Greenland may be converted into a point of aggression against nations of the American Continent by Nazi Germany. The agreement, after explicitly recognizing the Danish sovereignty over Greenland, granted to the United States the right to locate and construct airplane landing fields and other facilities for the defense of Greenland and for the defense of the North American Continent.

As soon as the agreement with the Danish Government was concluded, President Roosevelt authorized the War Department to go ahead with the preparations for building airfields and other facilities in Greenland. $5 million in funds previously allocated for constructing the bases acquired from the British in the Bases for Destroyers agreement was re-allocated to Greenland. On 30 June construction of the first U.S. Army and Navy base in Greenland, code-named Bluie West I began. Greenland Base Command (GBC) was established on 1 September 1941 with headquarters at Bluie West I to take charge of the U.S. forces and facilities being planned.

By the end of September 1941, when the contractor's people arrived, the troops at Bluie West I had erected 85 buildings, about two-thirds of the total needed for the initial force, and had begun to install the necessary utilities. They had built three miles (5 km) of access roads, constructed a temporary dock, and started work on the airfield. By the time the civilian construction force arrived they had finished grading one of the two runways and had a metal landing mat partly laid. Bluie West I was thus one of the earliest U.S. Army airfields, if not the first, to make actual use of Pierced Steel Planking (PSP) in runway construction, an important engineering development and one that afterwards contributed greatly to the winning of the war, particularly in the Pacific. After the arrival of the civilian construction force the engineer battalion, reinforced by a company of the 42nd Engineers (General Service), concentrated exclusively on airfield construction. They continued to do so until February 1942 when the civilian force took over this work as well. By then the first runway was ready for limited use. Construction work on a second west coast base further north, at Sondrestrom or Bluie West Eight, began in September 1941.

In addition, the United States obtained rights to build bases in Greenland. In July 1941, a task force of service troops arrived at Narsarsuaq. This site had been chosen as a major staging base between Labrador and Newfoundland. Work began at once on the base, which was given the code name Bluie West One (BW-1), and the first plane set down on 24 January 1942. Work on a second west coast base further north, at Sondrestrom or Bluie West Eight, began in September 1941. A third field was placed on the east coast almost directly across from BW-1 at Angmagssalik (Bluie East Two).

In the summer of 1941 the North-East Greenland Sledge Patrol was organized as a joint endeavor of the Army, the U.S. Coast Guard, and the Greenland Government. All the activity on the east coast the year before had demonstrated the ease with which anyone could establish a foothold in the vast Arctic wastes, the near impossibility of finding a hostile force that had established itself, and the difficulty of dislodging one, once it was discovered. An air patrol of the east coast, even after the new bases were completed proved its worth by assisting in the capture of the trawler Buskoe on 12 September, as that vessel, a small German-controlled Norwegian ship, was attempting to establish a radio and weather station in the Mackenzie Bay area.

In addition to the Army Airfields, the U.S. Atlantic Fleet established a number of stations on Greenland to support radio, weather, and naval patrols as part of the Battle of the North Atlantic against German U-boats and the protection of Allied convoy traffic in the North Atlantic.

==== Air Transport Command ====
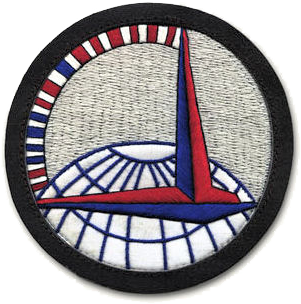
Emblem of Air Transport Command

In 1941, the United States established a series of northern airfields and weather stations across the Canadian Northwest Territories and Labrador with the approval of the Canadian government. The original mission of these airfields and stations was to aid in moving military aircraft to Great Britain as part of the Lend-Lease Act prior to American entry into World War II. The Canada-U.S. Permanent Joint Board on Defence made the plan official as Recommendations 17 and 26 in July 1941 and June 1942 respectively. First referred to as the "North East Staging Route," it eventually became known as the "Crimson Project" or "Crimson Route", supposedly after the Red Cross who were using the same route for medical evacuation of wounded soldiers from the European Theatre.

As an alternate to the previously developed base at Gander Lake in southern Newfoundland, the Canadian government in September 1941 began the development of Goose Bay in Labrador. During the preceding July the United States had sent engineers to Narsarssuak in Greenland for the building of the air base that came to be known as BLUIE WEST 1 (BW-1), and in the following September work began on BW-8, a much more northerly base on the western coast of Greenland. United States forces had taken over the defense of Iceland in July 1941, where they improved airstrips previously occupied by the RAF and began in the spring of 1942 to build two new air bases (Meeks and Patterson) near Keflavik. The eastern terminal lay at Prestwick in Scotland. When the Eighth Air Force began its movement in the summer of 1942, work was still in progress all along the route.

At that time it was hoped that some of the disadvantages of the existing route might be overcome by developing a more northerly airway extending from Great Falls, Montana, across Canada to Hudson Bay and thence by way of Baffin Island to Bluie West Eight in Greenland. In Canada, airfields were established at The Pas and Churchill in Manitoba; Southampton Island and a site code-named Crystal II in the Northwest Territories.

These airfields, along with airfields in Iceland, Greenland and Newfoundland established several transport routes for which aircraft could be ferried to Great Britain from manufacturing plants in different locations in the United States to Prestwick Field in Scotland. By thus following the great circle course, long one of the goals of airmen, the distance from southern California, where much of the U.S. aircraft industry was concentrated, to Iceland was reduced by almost 600 miles (970 km), with no leg of the journey longer than 850 miles (1,370 km).

Nearly 900 aircraft were ferried through the North Atlantic bases to active combat theaters in 1942, approximately 3,200 in 1943, over 8,400 in 1944, and approximately 2,150 in the last five months of the European conflict in 1945; in all nearly 15,000 planes. Equally important, and indeed fundamental to the fulfilment of the ferrying mission itself, was the development of a safe, dependable service for strategic air transportation between the United States and the United Kingdom.

=== Postwar era ===
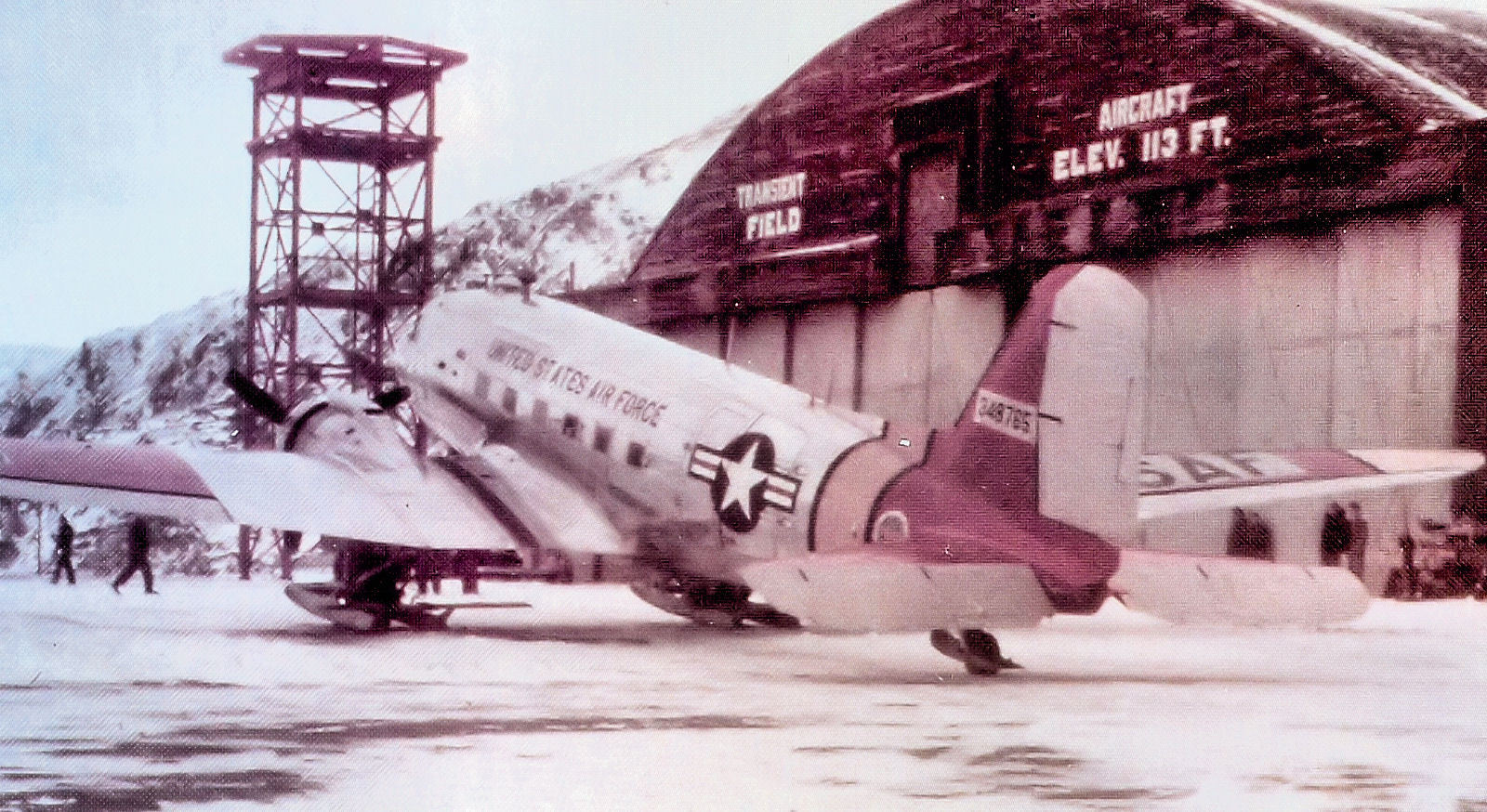
C-47 at Sondrestrom AB, Greenland

In 1946,the Navy built a new and much larger weather station at Thule, Greenland. The Army Corps of Engineers built a 4,000-foot (1,200 m) airstrip on the south side of the station. In the following year the Thule airstrip was used as a jump-off point for exploration and a supply point for construction of airstrips and weather stations on the Canadian side of the straits (Eureka, Resolute, and Isachsen). The first Air Transport Command aircraft landed on 9 September 1946. The Strategic Air Command East Reconnaissance Group (Project Nanook) flew B-17 mapping and photography missions from Thule's primitive facilities. In February 1947 the airfield was used to recover the crew of the downed B-29 Kee Bird.

The War Department decided that there was no longer a requirement for active defense of the areas of the North Atlantic bases. The Army began withdrawing personnel and equipment from the area, and on 1 September 1945, Greenland Base Command was consolidated with Newfoundland Base Command and became a subordinate organization of NBC. All United States Army and USAAF forces in Labrador and Northeast Canada were placed under the Newfoundland Base Command.

Shortly afterwards, on 1 January 1946, Newfoundland Base Command was transferred from the Army Eastern Defense Command and was placed under the control of Air Transport Command. NBC's mission being to maintain key airfields used by ATC between the United States and Great Britain. ATC was inactivated and control of NBC was reassigned to the new Military Air Transport Service (MATS) on 1 June 1948. This arrangement continued until late 1950.

=== Northeast Air Command ===
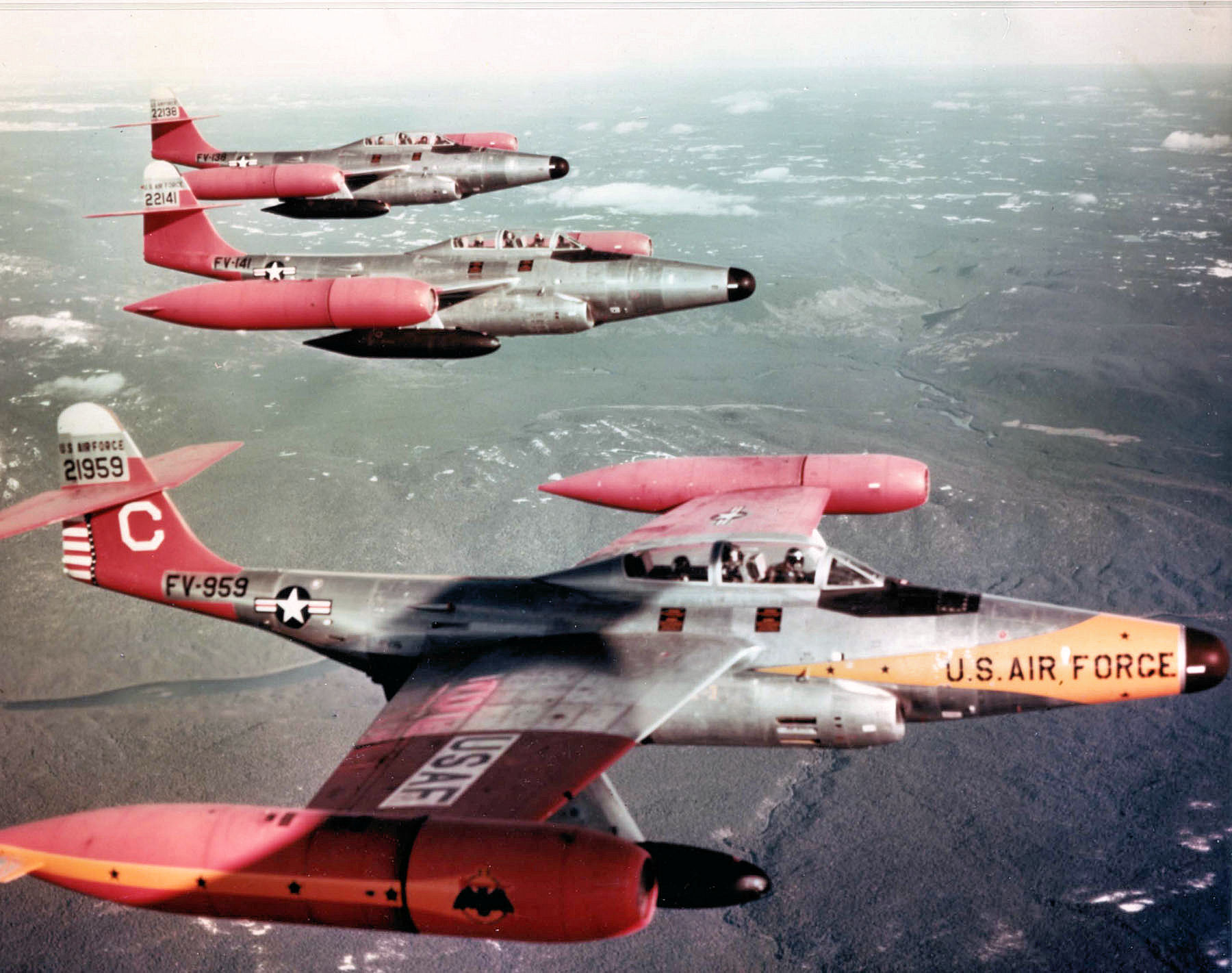
59th Fighter-Interceptor Squadron F-89D-45-NO Scorpion interceptors stationed at Goose AFB

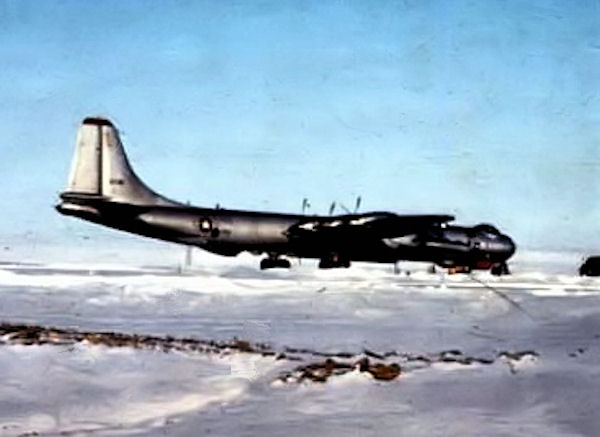
Strategic Air Command B-36 bomber refueling at Thule AB, Greenland

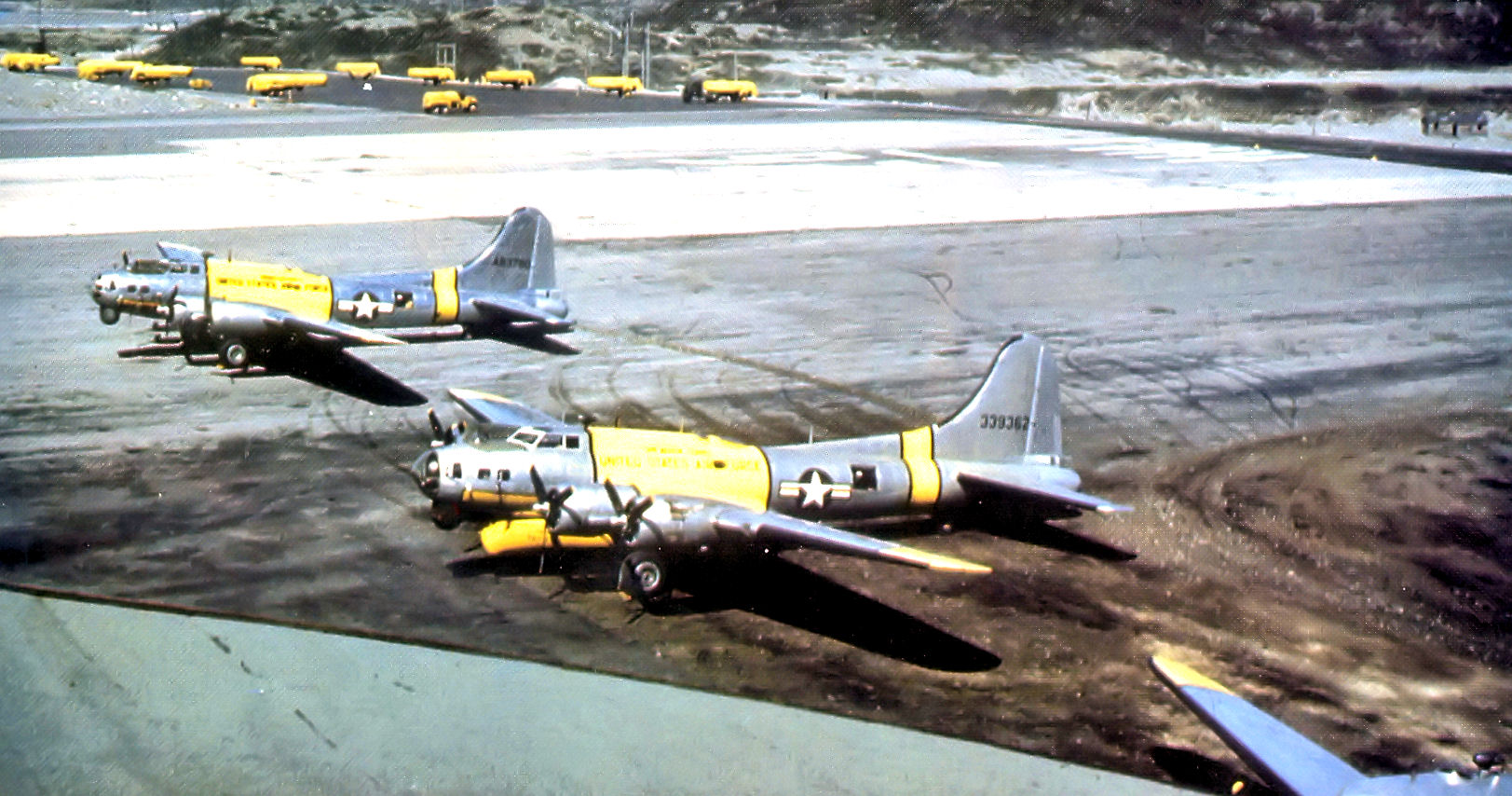
1st Rescue Squadron SB-17s Narsarsuaq Air Base, Greenland, about 1952

By 1948, the Cold War had erupted and a more urgent note was struck in the air defense of North America. The new Continental Air Command (ConAC), with headquarters at Mitchel Field, New York was established. Overall responsibility for air defense was vested in ConAC, and plans were made for a chain of Ground Control Intercept radar stations in Greenland and northeast Canada to detect any long-range Soviet aircraft approaching, with squadrons of interceptor aircraft to defend the airspace of North America.

The Newfoundland Base Command was inactivated on 1 October 1950, and control of units and the former Newfoundland and Greenland Base Commands facilities was transferred to the Northeast Air Command (NEAC). Similar to the Military Air Transport Service, NEAC was a Unified Department of Defense Command, under the jurisdiction of the United States Northeast Command (USNEC). USNEC operated as a joint-service unified command under direct operational control of the Joint Chiefs of Staff. NEAC was the only component of USNEC. Neither the Army nor the Navy ever established component commands, however Army and Navy officers served on the staff of USNEC. Air Force officers served in dual positions on the staff of NEAC and on the staff of USNEC until USNEC was abolished on 1 September 1956.

NEAC established its headquarters at Pepperrell AFB, Newfoundland and was given several additional units. In this form it had two primary missions, the former MATS mission supporting air transport and logistics, and a new role defending the defensive air bases of interceptors and radar stations being established in the region. NEAC's Area of Operations was defined as Newfoundland, Labrador, northeastern Canada, and Greenland.

The operational units of NEAC were organized into the 64th Air Division (Defense). As a result of the Cold War the mission of NEAC was to provide RADAR cover over the northwest Atlantic Ocean, to provide a fighter interceptor force to defend against approaching enemy aircraft, and to support United States Army anti-aircraft defense forces. These units initially included F-94 Starfire squadrons at Goose AFB in Labrador, and Ernest Harmon AFB in Newfoundland, as well as a variety of Air Control Wings in the early warning role in Newfoundland, Labrador and Baffin Island.

NEAC RADAR stations were part of the complex of stations built throughout Canada under the Canada-United States Radar Extension Plan (known as the Pinetree Line). In addition to the Pinetree stations located in Canada, three stations were built in Greenland. The Pinetree stations consisted of three direction centers and seven early warning stations. In Greenland, there were two early warning stations and a direction center. An air defense control center was built at Pepperrell AFB.

In the late 1940s the United States studied the possibility of establishing a major operating base in Greenland when it became clear that round trip flights of planes carrying atomic bombs between US or Canadian bases and European objectives were impractical. The shortest route from the US to the Soviet Union's most important industrial areas was over the North Pole, and Thule is at the precise midpoint between Moscow and New York. Thule became a key point in the whole American military strategy. Strategic Air Command bombers flying over the Arctic presented less risk of early warning than using bases in England. Defensively, Thule could serve as a base for intercepting bomber attacks along the northeastern approaches to Canada and the US.

Thule AB was constructed in secret under the code name Operation Blue Jay, with construction beginning in 1951. Construction took place around the clock. The workers lived on board the ship until quarters were built. It was built with a 10,000-foot (by 200') runway and a fuel storage capacity of about 100 million US gallons (380,000 m^{3}). On 1 July 1951, the 6622nd AB Squadron of NEAC arrived and air operations commenced on 11 September 1951. The first fighter interceptors assigned to Thule were four F-9ABs and began operations on 11 September 1952. This was Detachment 1 of the 59th Fighter-Interceptor Squadron, which went to Thule AB, Greenland with four F-94B's. Additional interceptor squadrons were established at Goose AFB in Labrador and Ernest Harmon AFB in Newfoundland and were composed of F-94s and F-89s. Also, there were numerous deployments of fighter-interceptor squadrons from the Tactical Air Command and Air Defense Command to NEAC bases, along with Strategic Air Command tankers and bombers, primarily using Thule as a refueling and staging base.

Plans were made in 1952 to station anti-aircraft units at Thule for the protection of the base. The first Army anti-aircraft personnel arrived on 3 July 1953, with the main body of troops arriving on 27 August. The units deployed were the 549th AAA Gun Battalion (90mm), 428th AAA Battery (Light) (75mm), 429th AAA Battery (Light) (75mm), 177th AAA Operations Detachment, 357th Signal Radar Maintenance Unit, 128th Ordnance Artillery Repair Detachment, and 162nd Ordnance Integrated Fire Control Repair Detachment.

=== Inactivation ===
In mid-1956, the Joint Chiefs of Staff completed a worldwide reorganization plan, the Unified Command Plan. Its aim was a more efficient structure and reduced cost. It achieved this by consolidating organizations and eliminating excess superstructures. As part of this consolidation, United States Northeast Command (USNEC) was disestablished as a joint-service unified command, with control being assumed by the Air Force. The Army anti-aircraft group in the area, the 7th at Thule, was assigned to Army Anti-Aircraft Command.

On 1 April 1957 the USAF discontinued NEAC. Air Defense Command and Strategic Air Command divided the Air Force units and equipment that had been under NEAC. ADC took over the USAF defense forces (including the 64th Air Division). ADC also took possession of Pepperrell AFB and all U.S. RADAR stations. SAC assumed ownership of Goose, Harmon, Thule, Narsarssuak, Sondrestrom, and Frobisher Bay Airport. Finally, ADC succeeded NEAC in its responsibilities for supporting and operating the Distant Early Warning Line radar stations in Canada and Greenland.

=== Lineage ===
- Established as Newfoundland Base Command (USA) on 15 January 1941
- Established as Greenland Base Command (USA) on 1 September 1941

Greenland Base Command became subordinate organization to Newfoundland Base Command, 1 September 1945
Newfoundland Base Command Discontinued 1 October 1950.
Greenland Base Command Discontinued 19 October 1950.

- Established as Northeast Air Command and activated as a USAF major command on 1 October 1950.

Northeast Air Command assumed jurisdiction of former NBC and GBC USAF facilities and units.
Discontinued on 1 April 1957.

=== Assignments ===
- Eastern Defense Command (U.S. Army), 15 January 1941
- Atlantic Division, Air Transport Command (USAAF), 1 January 1946
- Military Air Transport Service (MATS), 1 April 1948 – 1 October 1950
- HQ, United States Northeast Command, 1 October 1950
- HQ, United States Air Force, 1 September 1956 – 1 April 1957

=== Stations ===
==== Newfoundland Base Command ====
- RCAF Station Torbay, (Headquarters, Newfoundland Base Command)

411th Bombardment Squadron (NBC), 1 May–30 August 1941 (B-18 Bolo)
49th Bombardment Squadron (NBC), 13 December 1941 – June 1942 (B-18 Bolo)
429th Bombardment Squadron (NBC), 28 August 1941 – 29 October 1942 (B-18 Bolo)
847th Bombardment Squadron (later 20th Antisubmarine Squadron) (AAFAC), 29 October 1942 – 25 June 1943 (B-17 Flying Fortress)

- RCAF Station Gander

19th Antisubmarine Squadron (AAFAC), 19 March–25 June 1943 (B-17 Flying Fortress)
6th Antisubmarine Squadron (AAFAC), 12 April–21 August 1943 (B-24 Liberator)
4th Antisubmarine Squadron (AAFAC), 8–23 June 1943 (B-24 Liberator)

- Goose Air Base, Labrador (Air Transport Command, North Atlantic Wing)

==== Greenland Base Command ====
- Prins Christianssund (radio and weather station) (Bluie East One) (BE-1)
- Angmagssalik Army Airfield (Bluie East Two) (BE-2) (Air Transport Command)
- Cape Tobin, Walrus Bay (radio and weather station) (Bluie East Three) (BE-3)
- Ella Ø Island (radio, weather, and patrol station) (Bluie East Four) (BE-4)
- Eskimonæs (radio and weather station) (Bluie East Five) (BE-5) (United States Navy)
- Narsarsuaq Army Airfield (Bluie West One) (BW-1) (Air Transport Command) (HQ Greenland Base Command)
- Kipisako (alternate for Bluie West One) (Bluie West Two) (BW-2) (United States Navy)
- Simiutak Island (Bluie West Three) (BW-3) (United States Navy)
- Teague Field, Marraq Point (radio and weather station) (Bluie West Four) (BW-4) (United States Navy)
- Egedesminde (radio and weather station) (Bluie West Five) (BW-5) (United States Navy)
- Thule (radio and weather station) (Bluie West Six) (BW-6)
- Grønnedal Naval Base (radio and weather station), (Bluie West Seven) (BW-7) (United States Navy)
- Sondrestrom Army Airfield (Bluie West Eight) (Air Transport Command) (BW-8)
- Cruncher Island (defensive position for approaches to Søndre Strømfjord radio and weather station) (Bluie West Nine) (BW-9)

==== Northeast Air Command ====
- Ernest Harmon AFB, Newfoundland

6602d Air Base Wing, 1951–1957

- Goose AB, Labrador

6606th Air Base Wing, 1951–1957

- McAndrew AB, Newfoundland

6610th Air Base Group, 1951–1955

- Narsarsuaq AB, Greenland

6611th Air Base Group, 1951–1957

- Pepperrell AFB, Newfoundland

6604th Air Base Wing, 1951–1957

- Sondrestrom AB, Greenland

6621st Air Base Squadron, 1951
Re-designated: 6621st Air Base Group, 1955–1957

- Thule AB, Greenland

6622d Air Base Squadron, 1951
Re-designated: 6612th Air Base Group, 1952
Re-designated: 6607th Air Base Wing, 1954–1957

Jurisdiction of stations and units reassigned to Strategic Air Command, 1957

=== Units ===
==== Division ====
- 64th Air Division, Pepperrell AFB

20 December 1952 – 15 April 1957

The 64th Air Division was the primary operational component of the Northeast Air Command. It was an outgrowth of the 152d Aircraft Control and Warning Group (New York Air National Guard). Upon activation of the 64th AD, it inherited operational control of United States Army Anti-Aircraft units within the former NBC area. Reassigned to Air Defense Command, 1957

==== Transport units ====
- 6614th Air Transport Group

Pepperrell AFB, Newfoundland, 8 April 1952 – 1 April 1957

6622d Air Transport Squadron, Torbay Airport NF
6614th Air Transport Squadron, Harmon AB, NF
6615th Air Transport Squadron, Goose Bay AFB, LB

Performed inta-theater transport of materiel and personnel. Reassigned to Strategic Air Command, 1957

Interceptor squadrons

- 59th Fighter-Interceptor Squadron

Goose AFB, Labrador, 28 October 1952 – 1 April 1957
F-94B Starfire; F-89D/J Scorpion; F-102A Delta Dart

- 61st Fighter-Interceptor Squadron

Ernest Harmon AFB, Newfoundland, 6 August 1953 – 1 April 1957
F-89D Scorpion

- 74th Fighter-Interceptor Squadron

Thule AB, Greenland, 20 August 1954 – 1 April 1957
F-89B/D Scorpion

- 318th Fighter-Interceptor Squadron

Thule AB, Greenland, 1 July 1953 – 1 April 1957
F-94A Starfire

Interceptor Squadrons reassigned to Air Defense Command, 1957

Aircraft Control and Warning (Radar) Squadrons

- 105th Aircraft Control and Warning Squadron (Federalized NY Air National Guard, 152d AC&W Group)

Re-designated: 640th Aircraft Control and Warning Squadron, 1 January 1953
Stephenville AS, Newfoundland, 8 April 1952 – 1 April 1957

- 106th Aircraft Control and Warning Squadron (Federalized NY Air National Guard, 152d AC&W Group)

McAndrew AB, Newfoundland, 8 April 1952 – 1 January 1953

- 107th Aircraft Control and Warning Squadron (Federalized NY Air National Guard, 152d AC&W Group)

Re-designated: 931st Aircraft Control and Warning Squadron, 1 January 1953
Thule AS, Greenland, 8 April 1952 – 1 April 1957

- 108th Aircraft Control and Warning Squadron (Federalized NY Air National Guard, 152d AC&W Group)

Re-designated: 642d Aircraft Control and Warning Squadron, 1 January 1953
Red Cliff AS, Newfoundland, 8 April 1952 – 1 April 1957

- 920th Aircraft Control and Warning Squadron

Resolution Island AS, Northwest Territory, 19 January 1952 – 1 April 1957

- 921st Aircraft Control and Warning Squadron

Saint Anthony AS, Labrador, 1 October 1953 – 1 April 1957

- 923d Aircraft Control and Warning Squadron

Hopedale AS, Labrador, 1 October 1953 – 1 April 1957

- 924th Aircraft Control and Warning Squadron

Saglek AS, Labrador, 1 October 1953 – 1 April 1957

- 926th Aircraft Control and Warning Squadron

Frobisher Bay AB, Northwest Territory, 1 October 1953 – 1 April 1957

Units and jurisdiction of stations reassigned to Air Defense Command, 1957

== See also ==
- Island in the Sky – film based upon 1943 Air Corps Ferrying Command Labrador incident
1. Icelandic Base Command
2. Bermuda Base Command
3. Caribbean Defense Command
4. Alaska Defense Command
5. Northwest Service Command
