= CFS Resolution Island =

Radar site in Nunavut, Canada

CFS Resolution Island
- Part of North Warning System
- Nunavut, Canada
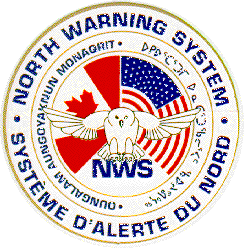

Site information
- Type: Radar Station
- Controlled by: Royal Canadian Air Force

Location
- Location of CFS Resolution Island, Nunavut
- Location within Canada
- Coordinates: 61.5964°N 64.6383°W

Site history
- Built: 1952
- In use: 1953-1961

CFS Resolution Island (BAF-5) is a short-range radar site. It is located 954 kilometres (593 miles) north-northwest of CFB Goose Bay, Labrador on Resolution Island. It is part of the North Warning System. During the Cold War, it was operated as part of the Pinetree Line network controlled by NORAD.

== History ==
As a result of the Cold War and with the expansion of a North American continental air defense system, Resolution Island was selected as a site for a United States Air Force (USAF) radar station, one of the many that would make up the Pinetree Line of ground-controlled intercept (GCI) radar sites.

In the original plans for the Pinetree Line, the N-30 radar station was to be located at Cape Chidley. Supplies were moved to the site by ship during 1951–52, but in late 1952–early 1953 the site was moved to Resolution Island.

The United States Air Force Northeast Air Command (NEAC) established a general surveillance radar station on Resolution Island in 1953, designating the site as "Resolution Island Air Station", with Site-ID of N-30. The 920th Aircraft Control and Warning Squadron was assigned to the site on 19 January 1952. It was equipped with the following radars:

- Search Radars: AN/FPS-3C, AN/FPS-502
- Height Radars: AN/TPS-502

As a GCI base, the 920th's role was to guide interceptor aircraft toward unidentified intruders picked up on the unit's radar scopes. These interceptors were assigned to the 64th Air Division at Goose AFB, Labrador. In 1957, with the inactivation of NEAC, the station came under the jurisdiction of Air Defense Command.

Routine operations from the station were performed until 1 November 1961, when the station was inactivated and turned over to the Royal Canadian Air Force, which closed the facility.

The Canadian Coast Guard operated a radio station from 1929 until 1975 under the call sign VAW. The station (MF Marine) was then moved to Killiniq, Northwest Territories (now Nunavut) in Ungava Bay on the south side of Hudson Strait.

- 1918 Cape Sable direction finding (DF) station opens
- 1929 Resolution Island Radio opens
- US Navy Radio Navigational Aids 1943 lists this as a DF stn at Resolution Island, also broadcasting navigational warnings on 500 kHz.

The site was re-activated by the Canadian Armed Forces as an unmanned North Warning System, short range radar site in 1991.

== See also ==
- Resolution Island (Nunavut)
- List of Royal Canadian Air Force stations
- United States general surveillance radar stations
