= List of Royal Canadian Air Force stations =

This is a list of stations operated by the Royal Canadian Air Force (RCAF), or stations where RCAF units existed, from 1924 until unification into the Canadian Forces on February 1, 1968.

Some of the RCAF stations listed in this article link to facility descriptions containing the prefix "CFB" (Canadian Forces Base) or "CFS" (Canadian Forces Station). These facilities were at one time RCAF stations, but changed to CFBs or CFSs following unification of the Canadian Armed Forces in 1968. Most former RCAF stations still in use by the Canadian Forces are still operated by the RCAF (renamed from Air Command or AIRCOM in 2011, from the use "air element" 1968–2011). During the 1990s, most RCAF squadrons on Canadian Forces Bases were reorganized into "wings" as the primary lodger unit. Consequently, many Canadian Forces Bases used as air force bases are frequently referred to without the prefix CFB, e.g., "CFB Greenwood" is also referred to as "14 Wing Greenwood", with 14 Wing being the primary lodger unit at CFB Greenwood.

Before 1968, all RCAF facilities followed the naming tradition of the Royal Air Force, whereby the prefix RCAF (vs. RAF) was affixed.

== Operating locations (1924–1939) ==
=== Primary Canadian stations ===
==== Alberta ====
- High River

==== British Columbia ====
- Vancouver

==== Manitoba ====
- Winnipeg

==== Nova Scotia ====
- Dartmouth

==== Ontario ====
- Camp Borden
- Ottawa
- Quinte West

== Operating locations (1939–1945) ==
=== Primary Canadian stations ===
==== Alberta ====
- RCAF Station Bowden
- RCAF Station Calgary
- RCAF Station Claresholm
- RCAF Station De Winton
- RCAF Station Edmonton
- RCAF Detachment Edmonton
- RCAF Station Fort Macleod
- RCAF Station High River
- RCAF Station Lethbridge
- RCAF Detachment Lethbridge
- RCAF Detachment Netook
- RCAF Station Pearce
- RCAF Station Penhold
- RCAF Station Vulcan
- RCAF Station Wainwright

==== British Columbia ====
- RCAF Station Abbotsford
- RCAF Station Alliford Bay
- RCAF Station Bella Bella
- RCAF Station Boundary Bay
- RCAF Station Coal Harbour
- RCAF Station Comox
- RCAF Station Dog Creek
- RCAF Station Fort Nelson
- RCAF Station Fort St. John
- RCAF Station Hope
- RCAF Station Holberg
- RCAF Station Jericho Beach
- RCAF Station Midway
- RCAF Station Oliver
- RCAF Station Patricia Bay
- RCAF Station Penticton
- RCAF Station Port Hardy
- RCAF Station Prince George
- RCAF Station Prince Rupert
- RCAF Station Princeton
- RCAF Station Sea Island
- RCAF Station Smithers
- RCAF Station Terrace
- RCAF Station Tofino
- RCAF Station Quesnel
- RCAF Station Ucluelet

==== Manitoba ====
- RCAF Station Brandon
- RCAF Station Carberry
- RCAF Station Dauphin
- RCAF Station Gimli
- RCAF Station Macdonald
- RCAF Station Neepawa
- RCAF Station Paulson
- RCAF Station Portage la Prairie
- RCAF Station Rivers, Canadian Joint Air Training Command (CJATC) New Sarum
- RCAF Station Souris
- RCAF Station Virden
- RCAF Station Winnipeg
- RCAF Detachment Winnipeg

==== New Brunswick ====
- RCAF Station Chatham
- RCAF Station Moncton
- RCAF Station Pennfield Ridge
- RCAF Station Saint John
- RCAF Station Scoudoc

==== Nova Scotia ====
- RCAF Station Dartmouth
- RCAF Station Debert
- RCAF Station Greenwood
- RCAF Station Halifax
- RCAF Station Maitland
- RCAF Aerodrome New Glasgow & Trenton
- RCAF Station Stanley
- RCAF Station Shelburne
- RCAF Station Sydney
- RCAF Station Yarmouth
- Sydney River Base (Sydney River, Nova Scotia)
- Kelly Beach (North Sydney, Nova Scotia)

==== Ontario ====
- RCAF Detachment Alliston
- RCAF Detachment Armstrong Station
- RCAF Station Aylmer
- RCAF Station Arnprior
- RCAF Station Belleville
- RCAF Station Brantford
- RCAF Station Camp Borden
- RCAF Detachment Cayuga
- RCAF Station Centralia
- RCAF Station Clinton
- RCAF Station Crumlin
- RCAF Station Deseronto
- RCAF Station Dunnville
- RCAF Detachment Edenvale
- RCAF Station Edgar
- RCAF Station Fingal
- RCAF Station Guelph
- RCAF Station Hagersville
- RCAF Station Hamilton
- RCAF Station Jarvis
- RCAF Detachment Kapuskasing
- RCAF Station Kingston
- RCAF Station Leaside
- RCAF Station London
- RCAF Detachment Malton
- RCAF Station Mountain View
- RCAF Station North Bay
- RCAF Station Oshawa
- RCAF Station Pendleton
- RCAF Station Picton
- RCAF Station Port Albert
- RCAF Station Rockcliffe
- RCAF Station Trenton
- RCAF Station Uplands
- RCAF Detachment Welland

==== Prince Edward Island ====
- RCAF Station Charlottetown
- RCAF Station Mount Pleasant
- RCAF Station Summerside

==== Quebec ====
- RCAF Station Bagotville
- RCAF Station Parent
- RCAF Station Gaspé
- RCAF Station Lachine
- RCAF Station Mont-Joli
- RCAF Station Montreal
- RCAF Station Sept-Îles
- RCAF Station St Hubert
- RCAF Station St Jean
- RCAF Station Victoriaville
- RCAF Detachment Montreal
- RCAF Detachment Megantic

==== Saskatchewan ====
- RCAF Station Assiniboia
- RCAF Station Caron
- RCAF Station Dafoe
- RCAF Station Davidson
- RCAF Station Estevan
- RCAF Station Moose Jaw
- RCAF Station Mossbank
- RCAF Station North Battleford
- RCAF Station Prince Albert
- RCAF Station Regina
- RCAF Station Saskatoon
- RCAF Station Swift Current
- RCAF Station Yorkton
- RCAF Station Weyburn

=== Non-Canadian North American operating locations ===
==== Alaska ====
- Annette Island Army Airfield
- Fort Glenn Army Airfield (Umnak)
- Kiska Army Airfield
- Elmendorf Army Airfield (Anchorage)
- Marks Air Force Base (Nome)
- Miller Army Airfield
- Naval Air Station Adak
- Naval Air Station Kodiak

==== Bermuda ====
- Hamilton

==== Newfoundland ====
- RCAF Station Botwood
- RCAF Station Gander
- RCAF Brig Harbour
- RCAF Cape Bauld
- RCAF Cape Ray
- RCAF Station Torbay
- RCAF Port aux Basques

=== United Kingdom operating locations ===
==== England ====
- RAF Acklington
- RAF Andover
- RAF Ashford
- RAF Baginton
- RAF Balderton
- RAF Bassingbourn
- RAF Beaulieu
- RAF Biggin Hill
- RAF Bircham Newton
- RAF Blakehill Farm
- RAF Bradwell Bay
- RAF Burn
- RAF Castle Camps
- RAF Catterick
- RAF Charmy Down
- RAF Chivenor
- RAF Coleby Grange
- RAF Colerne
- RAF Croft
- RAF Croydon
- RAF Dalton
- RAF Davidstow Moor
- RAF Debden
- RAF Digby
- RAF Dishforth
- RAF Docking
- RAF Down Ampney
- RAF Driffield
- RAF Dunsfold
- RAF East Moor
- RAF Eastchurch
- RAF Exeter
- RAF Ford
- RAF Friston
- RAF Funtington
- RAF Gatwick
- RAF Gransden Lodge
- RAF Gravesend
- RAF Hartford Bridge
- RAF Harrowbeer
- RAF Halton
- RAF Hawkinge
- RAF Headcorn
- RAF High Post
- RAF Holmsley South
- RAF Hornchurch
- RAF Horne
- RAF Hunsdon
- RAF Hurn/Bournemouth
- RAF Kenley
- RAF Lashenden
- RAF Leeming
- RAF Lindholme
- RAF Linton-on-Ouse
- RAF Lympne
- RAF Manston
- RAF Martlesham Heath
- RAF Merston
- RAF Middle Wallop
- RAF Middleton St. George
- RAF Mildenhall
- RAF Molesworth
- RAF North Coates
- RAF North Luffenham
- RAF North Weald
- RAF Odiham
- RAF Old Sarum
- RAF Penshurst
- RAF Perranporth
- RAF Pocklington
- RAF Portreath
- RAF Predannack
- RAF Redhill
- RAF Scorton
- RAF Skipton-on-Swale
- RAF Southend
- RAF St Eval
- RAF Staplehurst
- RAF Strubby
- RAF Syerston
- RAF Tangmere
- RAF Topcliffe
- RAF Tempsford
- RAF Ternhill
- RAF Tholthorpe
- RAF Thorney Island
- RAF Trebulzue
- RAF Waddington
- RAF Warmwood
- RAF Wellingore
- RAF West Malling
- RAF Westhampnett
- RAF Weston Zoyland
- RAF Winkleigh
- RAF Wittering
- RAF Wombleton
- RAF Woodchurch
- RAF Zeals

==== Northern Ireland ====
- RAF Castle Archdale
- RAF Limavady

==== Scotland ====
- RAF Ayr
- RAF Banff
- RAF Castletown
- RAF Dallachy
- RAF Dundonald
- RAF Dyce
- RAF Leuchars
- RAF Oban
- RAF Peterhead
- RAF Prestwick
- RAF Skeabrae
- RAF Skitten
- RAF Stranraer
- RAF Sullom Voe
- RAF Sumburgh
- RAF Tain
- RAF Wick

==== Wales ====
- RAF Angle
- RAF Fairwood Common
- RAF Valley
- RAF Pembroke Dock

=== Northern Europe operating locations ===
==== Belgium ====
- Base 90 Kleine-Brogel
- Base 56 Evere
- Base 58 Melsbroek
- Base 64 Diest
- Base 66 Blankenburg
- Base 68 Le Culot
- Base 70 Antwerp
- Base 71 Koksijde
- Base 75 Nivelles

==== Denmark ====
- Base 160 Copenhagen

==== France ====
- ALG (Advanced Landing Ground) Wormhout
- Base 2 Bazenville
- Base 3 Ste Croix-sur-Mer
- Base 4 Beny-sur-Mer
- Base 8 Sommervieu
- Base 9 Lantheuil
- Base 11 Longues
- Base 17 Carpiquet
- Base 18 Cristot
- Base 19 Lingevres
- Base 21 Ste-Honorine-de-Ducy
- Base 24 St Andre
- Base 25 Illiers l'Eveque
- Base 28 Evreux
- Base 34 Avrilly
- Base 40 Beauvais
- Base 44 Poix
- Base 48 Glisy
- Base 51 Vendeville
- Base 52 Douai

==== Germany ====
- Base 100 Goch
- Base 108 Rheine
- Base 110 Osnabruck
- Base 114 Diepholz
- Base 116 Wunstorf
- Base 118 Celle
- Base 150 Hustedt
- Base 152 Fassberg
- Base 154 Soltau
- Base 156 Luneburg
- Base 166 Flensburg
- Base 174 Uetersen
- Base Y-75 Frankfurt

==== Iceland ====
- Reykjavík

==== The Netherlands ====
- ALG Arnhem
- ALG Breda
- ALG Nijmegen
- ALG Tilburg
- Base 77 Gilze-Rijen
- Base 78 Eindhoven
- Base 80 Volkel
- Base 82 Grave
- Base 84 Rips
- Base 88 Heesch
- Base 106 Twente
- 'JOE' Airfield (Apeldoorn)

==== Norway ====
- Oslo, Norway

=== Southern Europe and Mediterranean Sea operating locations ===
- Gibraltar
- Luga, Malta

==== Italy ====
- Bellaria
- Canne
- Cassibile
- Fano
- Fabrica
- Foggia
- Gioia del Colle
- Grottaglie
- India Anzio
- Lentini West
- Littorio, Rome, Italy
- Loreto
- Perugia
- Treviso
- Triolo
- Tulihal
- Venafro

==== North Africa ====
- Devesoir, Egypt
- Kafareet, Egypt
- Idku, Egypt
- Shandur, Egypt
- Mellaha, Libya
- Tripoli
- Rabat-Sale, Morocco
- Ben Gardane, Tunisia
- Goubrine South, Tunisia
- Hani East Landing Ground, Tunisia
- Kairouan/Zina, Tunisia
- Kairouan/Pavilllier, Tunisia

=== Other operating locations ===
==== Indian Ocean ====
- Kinmagan, Burma
- Kyaukpyu, Burma
- Mawnubyin, Burma
- Koggala, Ceylon
- Gujrat, India
- Kanglatongbi, India
- Addu Atoll, Seychelles Islands

==== Persian Gulf ====
- Bahrain

==== Africa ====
- Langebaan, South Africa
- Mombasa, Kenya

== Operating locations (1946–1968) ==
=== Primary Canadian stations ===
==== Alberta ====
- RCAF Station Cold Lake
- RCAF Station Penhold
- RCAF Station Edmonton

==== British Columbia ====
- RCAF Station Comox
- RCAF Station Holberg
- RCAF Station Sea Island

==== Manitoba ====
- RCAF Station Portage la Prairie
- RCAF Station Winnipeg

==== New Brunswick ====
- RCAF Station Chatham

==== Newfoundland ====
- RCAF Station Gander
- RCAF Station Goose Bay

==== Nova Scotia ====
- RCAF Station Greenwood
- RCAF Station Shearwater

==== Ontario ====
- RCAF Station Borden
- RCAF Station North Bay
- RCAF Station Trenton
- RCAF Station Uplands
- RCAF Station Rockcliffe
- RCAF Station Downsview

==== Prince Edward Island ====
- RCAF Station Summerside

==== Quebec ====
- RCAF Station Bagotville
- RCAF Station St Hubert

- RCAF Station Parent
- RCAF Station Senneterre
- RCAF Station Lac St Denis
- RCAF Station Lamacaza

RCAF Station Val d'Or

==== Saskatchewan ====
- RCAF Station Moose Jaw

=== Auxiliary Canadian stations ===
==== Alberta ====
- RCAF Station Namao

==== Manitoba ====
- RCAF Station Rivers Canadian Joint Air Training Command (CJATC) New Sarum
- RCAF Station Gimli

==== Newfoundland ====
- RCAF Station Torbay

==== Northwest Territories ====
- RCAF Station Resolute Bay

==== Nova Scotia ====
- RCAF Station Debert

==== Ontario ====
- RCAF Station Clinton
- RCAF Station Centralia

==== Quebec ====
- RCAF Station Dorval
- RCAF Station La Macaza
- RCAF Station Val d'Or

==== Yukon ====
- RCAF Station Whitehorse

=== Emergency Canadian airfields ===
==== British Columbia ====
- Port Hardy
- Puntzi Mountain
- Tofino

==== Ontario ====
- Earlton
- RCAF Detachment Grand Bend
- Gore Bay
- Killaloe
- Muskoka
- Sudbury
- Timmins
- Wiarton

==== Quebec ====
- Casey
- Lac-des-Loups
- L'Ancienne-Lorette
- La Tuque
- RCAF Station Mont-Joli
- Val-d'Or

=== DEW Line radar stations ===
This covers 1946–1968. Nunavut was created in 1999. Stations are listed from west to east.

==== Yukon ====
- Komakuk Beach
- Stokes Point
- Shingle Point

==== Northwest Territories ====
- Tununuk Camp
- Tuktoyaktuk
- Atkinson Point
- Nicholson Peninsula
- Horton River
- Cape Parry
- Pearce Point
- Clinton Point
- Clifton Point
- Cape Young
- Bernard Harbour
- Lady Franklin Point
- Ross Point
- Byron Bay
- Cape Peel
- Cambridge Bay
- Sturt Point
- Jenny Lind Island
- Hat Island
- Gladman Point
- Matheson Point
- Shepherd Bay
- Simpson Lake
- Pelly Bay
- Keith Bay
- Mackar Inlet
- Scarpa Lake
- Hall Beach
- Rowley Island
- Bray Island
- Longstaff Bluff
- Nudluardjuk Lake
- Dewar Lakes
- Ekalugad
- Cape Hooper
- Kivitoo
- Broughton Island
- Durban Island
- Cape Dyer
- Brevoort Island
- Resolution Island

=== Mid-Canada Line radar stations ===
==== Alberta ====
- RCAF Station Stoney Mountain

==== British Columbia ====
- RCAF Station Dawson Creek

==== Manitoba ====
- RCAF Station Bird
- RCAF Station Cranberry Portage

==== Newfoundland and Labrador ====
- Border Beacon
- Hopedale Air Station

==== Ontario ====
- RCAF Station Winisk

==== Quebec ====
- RCAF Station Knob Lake
- RCAF Station Great Whale River

=== Pinetree Line radar stations ===
==== Alberta ====
- RCAF Station Beaverlodge
- RCAF Station Cold Lake
- RCAF Station Penhold

==== British Columbia ====
- RCAF Station Baldy Hughes
- RCAF Station Comox
- RCAF Station Holberg
- RCAF Station Kamloops
- RCAF Station Puntzi Mountain
- RCAF Station Tofino

==== Manitoba ====
- RCAF Station Beausejour
- RCAF Station Gypsumville

==== New Brunswick ====
- RCAF Station St. Margarets

==== Newfoundland & Labrador ====
- Cartwright Air Station
- Cape Makkovik Air Station
- Cut Throat Island Air Station
- Elliston Ridge Air Station
- Fox Harbour Air Station
- RCAF Station Gander
- RCAF Station Goose Bay
- Hopedale Air Station
- La Scie Air Station
- Melville Air Station
- Red Cliff Air Station
- RCAF Station Saglek
- Saint Anthony Air Station
- RCAF Station St. John's
- Spotted Island Air Station
- Stephenville Air Station

==== Nova Scotia ====
- RCAF Station Beaverbank
- RCAF Station Barrington
- RCAF Station Sydney

==== Northwest Territories ====
- RCAF Station Frobisher Bay
- RCAF Station Resolution Island

==== Ontario ====
- RCAF Station Armstrong
- RCAF Station Edgar
- RCAF Station Falconbridge
- RCAF Station Foymount
- RCAF Station Lowther
- RCAF Station Moosonee
- RCAF Station Pagwa
- RCAF Station Ramore
- RCAF Station Sioux Lookout

==== Quebec ====
- RCAF Station Chibougamau
- RCAF Station Moisie
- RCAF Station Mont Apica
- RCAF Station Lac St. Denis
- RCAF Station Parent
- RCAF Station Senneterre
- RCAF Station St. Sylvestre

==== Saskatchewan ====
- RCAF Station Alsask
- RCAF Station Dana
- R AF Station Yorkton

=== Primary overseas stations ===
==== United Kingdom ====
- RCAF Langar
- RCAF Station North Luffenham
- RAF Odiham

==== France ====
- RCAF Station Marville
- RCAF Station Grostenquin
- RCAF Metz, France

==== Germany ====
- RCAF Station Baden-Soellingen
- RCAF Station Lahr
- CFS Ringsheim
- RCAF Station Zweibrücken

==== Afghanistan ====
- Kandahar Air Base

== British Commonwealth Air Training Plan relief airfields ==
- Relief airfield for No. 6 Service Flying Training School/RCAF Station Dunnville
- RCAF Detachment Gananoque

== See also ==
- List of military installations in Canada
