= CFS Moisie =

Former Canadian Forces Station in Quebec

- Part of The Pinetree Line
- Quebec, Canada

Site information
- Code: C-34
- Controlled by: Royal Canadian Air Force

Location
- Location of CFS Moisie
- Coordinates: 50.194167°N 66.087778°W

Site history
- Built: 1953
- Built by: Royal Canadian Air Force
- In use: 1953-1986

Garrison information
- Garrison: 211 Aircraft Control and Warning Squadron

Canadian Forces Station Moisie, also known as CFS Moisie, is a former Canadian Forces Station located in the community of Moisie, Quebec.

It was operational as a Pinetree Line radar station from June 1953 to 1988.

== RCAF Station Moisie ==
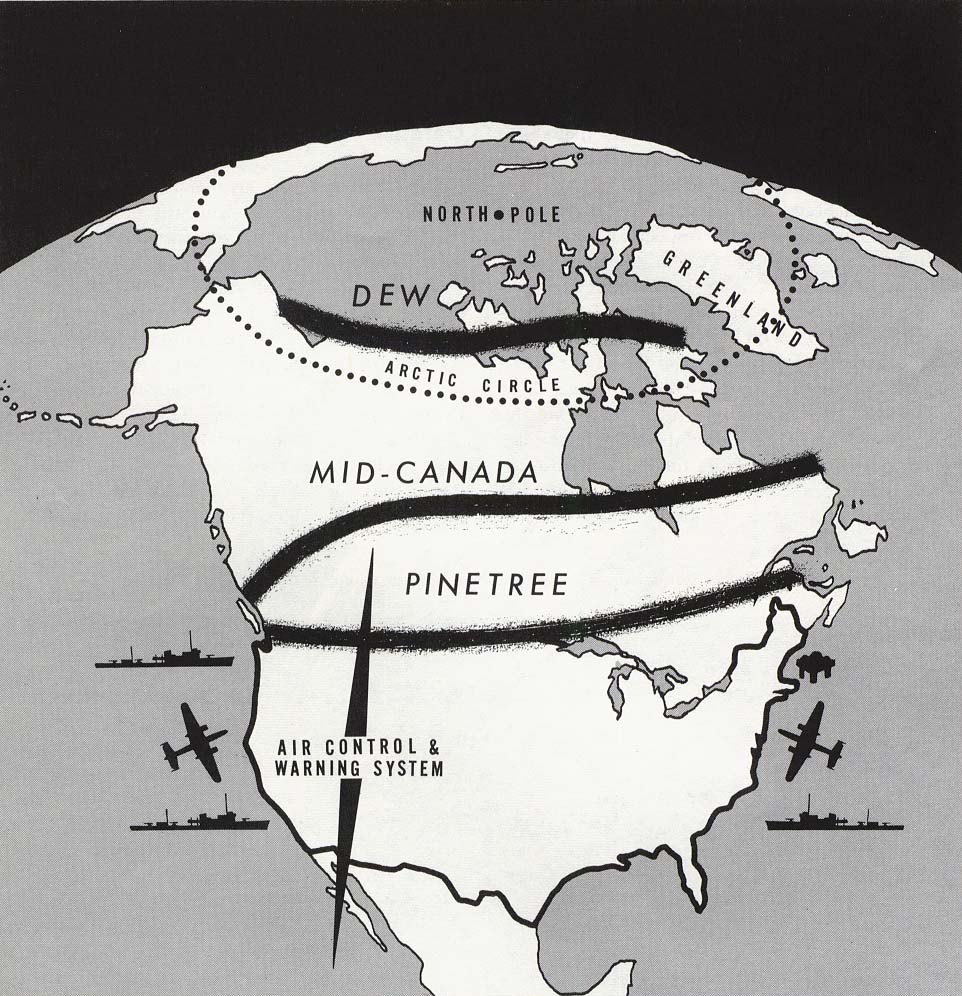
A rough map of the three warning lines. From north to south: Distant Early Warning (DEW) Line, Mid-Canada Line, and Pinetree Line.

The Royal Canadian Air Force began construction of RCAF Station Moisie in 1952 at a location approximately 25 km (16 mi) east of the centre of Sept-Îles. The station was situated at Pointe Moisie, which is on the west bank of the Moisie River where it meets the St. Lawrence River. At the time of construction, the RCAF had been calling the facility RCAF Station Clarke City; however, since the actual town of Clarke City was located 50 km (31 mi) west of the site, on the Sainte-Marguerite River, the RCAF decided to name the site after the adjacent community of Moisie.

As construction neared completion, an advance party consisting of one officer and nine airmen arrived on a Trans-Canada Air Lines North Star at the Sept-Îles Airport on 25 May 1953. The RCAF formally took over the site on 30 June 1953, and on 15 September 1953 the site was made operational under the RCAF's Air Defence Command as part of the Pinetree Line network of radar stations.

The location of the station along the north shore of the lower St. Lawrence River (part of the Côte-Nord region) provided coverage of a large portion of eastern Quebec, western Labrador, the Gaspé Peninsula, and the western Gulf of St. Lawrence. This location complemented the USAF-operated Pinetree Line stations at Stephenville, NL to the east and at Goose Bay, NL to the north, as well as the RCAF-operated Pinetree Line stations at RCAF Station Sydney to the east, RCAF Station Chibougamau to the west, and RCAF Station St. Margarets to the south. The early 1950s was a period of significant industrial development in the Côte-Nord region, with construction of iron ore loading facilities at Sept-Îles, connected by the Quebec, North Shore and Labrador Railway to iron ore mines in Schefferville, QC and several years later in Labrador City, NL. Further iron ore loading facilities opened in 1965 at Pointe-Noire, connected by the Arnaud Railway. The opening of the Saint Lawrence Seaway in 1959 also saw an increase in commercial shipping traffic using the St. Lawrence River. Consequently, RCAF Station Moisie was deemed essential to protecting these assets from potential aerial attack.

Using the radio callsign "CROWBAR," the Moisie station consisted of three sites: the Operation Site (OPS), the Ground-Air-Transmission-Reception (GATR), and the Transmission Site (TX). A large radome housed the early warning and ground control intercept radars. Support buildings were constructed, including residences for personnel. The primary lodger unit established at the station was No. 211 Aircraft Warning Squadron; this unit formed at Moisie on June 30, 1953, while the station was under construction. Search radars installed included models FPS-3, FPS-502, FPS-27; TPS-502, FPS-6, and FPS-26.

No. 211 Squadron was operationally controlled by Sector Commander 2 ADCC, RCAF Station Chatham. The RCAF air bases at RCAF Station Chatham and RCAF Station Bagotville, as well as the USAF's Ernest Harmon AFB in Stephenville were the nearest bases for interceptor aircraft that would respond to anything detected by the Moisie main radar.

Following the 1958 partnership between the USAF and RCAF to form the North American Aerospace Defence Command or NORAD, many Pinetree Line radar stations were upgraded for automation and consolidation of intercept data. No. 211 Aircraft Warning Squadron became No. 211 Aircraft Control & Warning Squadron in November 1956. In July 1958 RCAF Station Moisie was placed on increased alert due to the 1958 Lebanon crisis. In May 1959, RCAF Station Moisie transitioned from a strictly early warning and identification site to that of an air defence ground control interceptor site. Consequently, RCAF Station Moisie's radar equipment underwent an upgrade in the late 1950s and early 1960s with the operational implementation of the Semi-Automatic Ground Environment (SAGE) System on 1 November 1963, designated with SAGE ID C-33. Under SAGE, the Moisie station collected, discriminated and transmitted its radar coverage data to the designated SAGE Control Centre in the Bangor NORAD sector, located at Topsham AFS in Maine.

== CFS Moisie ==
On February 1, 1968, the RCAF merged with the Royal Canadian Navy (RCN) and the Canadian Army to form the Canadian Armed Forces. As part of the unification, RCAF Station Moisie was renamed to Canadian Forces Station Moisie, or CFS Moisie.

The end of the Cold War and obsolescence of the Pinetree Line radar stations saw CFS Moisie's radar cease operations in 1986 and the site was declared surplus by the Canadian Forces.

The station was decommissioned by the Department of National Defence in the early 1990s whereby the Government of Canada transferred the property to the Government of Quebec.

== Media ==
CFRM radio began broadcasting from the radar site in 1964. The popular station with a 10 watt output was located at 1340 kHz on the AM dial. It is unknown when the station left the air.
