= Foymount, Ontario =

Community in Ontario, Canada

Coordinates: 45°26′00″N 77°18′15″W

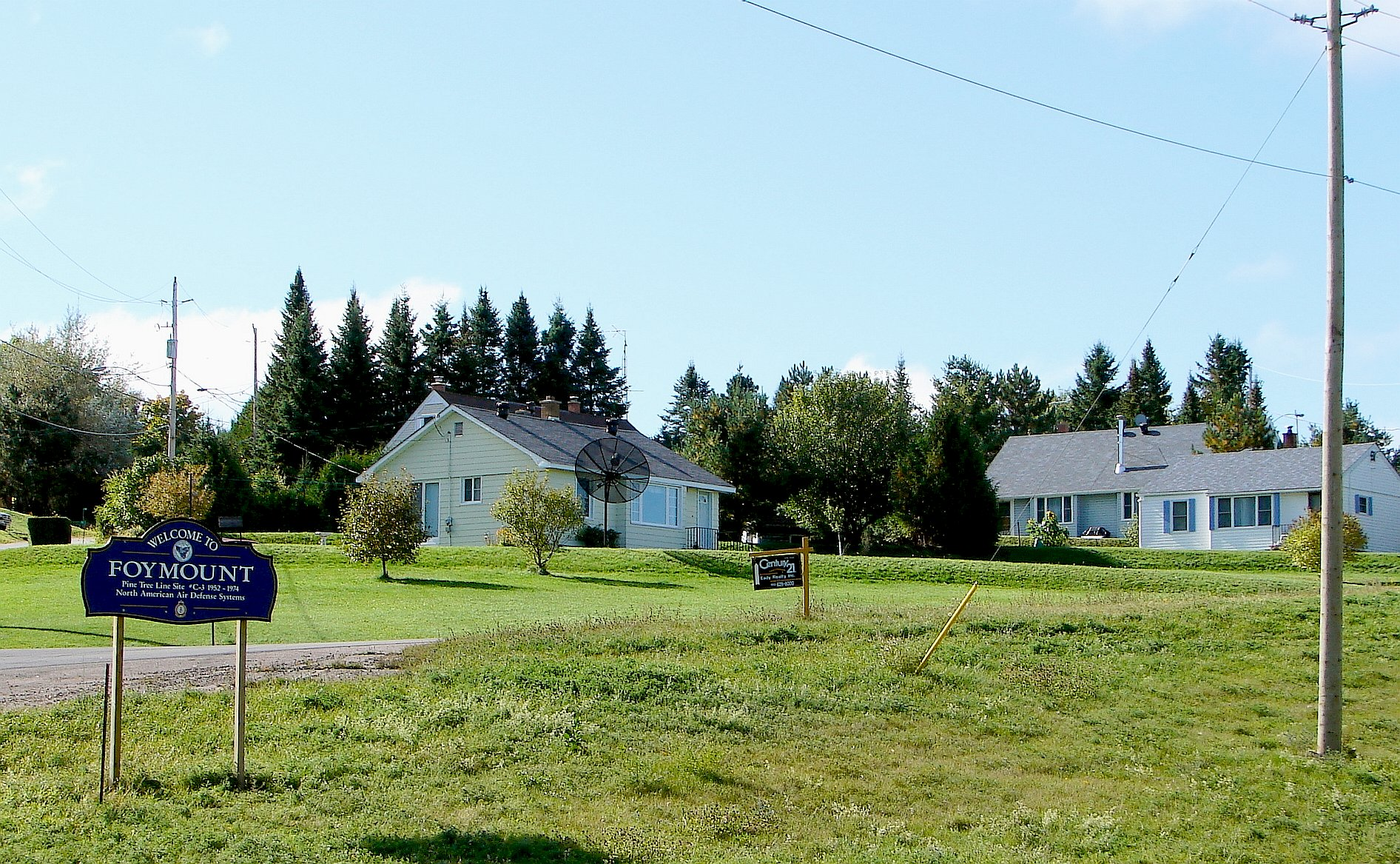
Foymount welcome sign

Foymount is a community situated in the township of Bonnechere Valley, Ontario, Canada, located on Highway 512 and the Opeongo Road in Renfrew County, west of Eganville. Foymount is approximately 125 kilometres (80 mi) due west of Ottawa.

Foymount claims to be Ontario's highest populated point at 523 meters (1,716 ft) above sea level, well below Dundalk's 526 meters (1,726 ft) - according to an unknown source.

The community was named for John Foy, postmaster.

Foymount and the surrounding area is a popular destination for backpackers and hikers, and was the location of warranty and repair facilities for camping equipment manufacturer Sierra Designs. However, the outlet closed on August 26, 2010.

The location is also popular for amateur astronomers given the high altitude and low levels of artificial light.

== Canadian military history ==
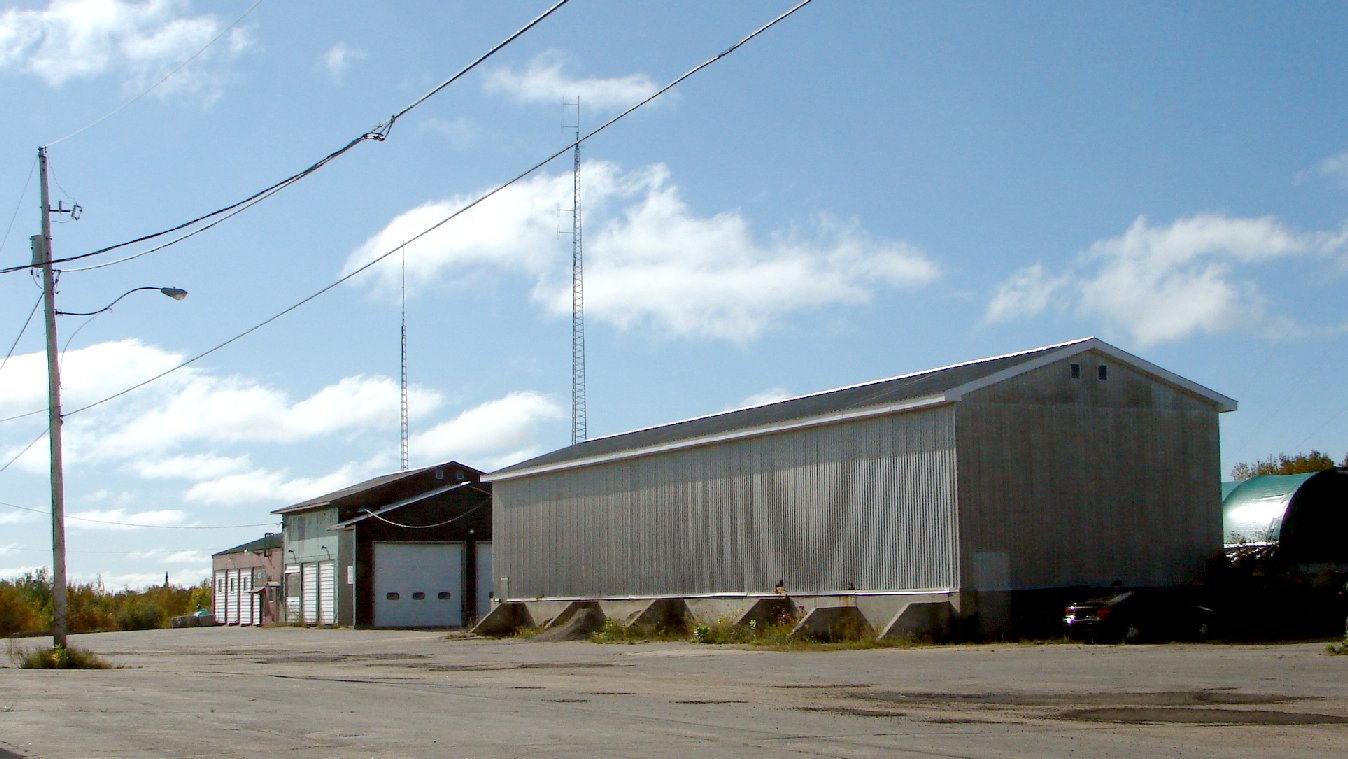
Former CFS base

Because of the high altitude, the Royal Canadian Air Force built a radar base on the site in the 1950s as part of the Pinetree Radar Line, established for the detection of nuclear bombers coming over the polar region from the Soviet Union. Canadian Forces Station (CFS) Foymount was closed in 1974 because more powerful radar installations that overlapped Foymount's coverage area were built at Canadian Forces Station (CFS) Falconbridge in Ontario and CFS Lac St. Denis in Quebec. Following the closure of the radar base, the associated buildings and properties were sold off to private interests.

== Telecommunications and broadcasting ==
The high-altitude site is also popular for the purpose of radio and television transmission. The Canadian Broadcasting Corporation operated a rebroadcast transmitter (CBOT-TV-1) at the site until 2012. In 2006 the Canadian Radio-television and Telecommunications Commission rejected an application for United Christian Broadcasters Canada to begin operating a rebroadcast transmitter on the site.

== See also ==
- Foymount Farm
