= John Mitchner =

Canadian flying ace of WWII

- Born: 3 July 1914; Saskatoon, Saskatchewan, Canada
- Died: 8 December 1964 (aged 50); Penticton, British Columbia, Canada
- Military career
- Allegiance: Canada
- Branch: Royal Canadian Air Force
- Service years: 1940–1960
- Rank: Wing Commander
- Commands: No. 417 Squadron; No. 416 Squadron
- Conflicts: Second World War: Circus offensive; Operation Market Garden; Western Allied invasion of Germany
- Awards: Distinguished Flying Cross & Bar

John Davidson Mitchner, DFC & Bar (3 July 1914 – 8 December 1964) was a Canadian flying ace who served in the Royal Canadian Air Force (RCAF) during the Second World War. During his service with the RCAF, he was credited with at least ten aerial victories.

Born in Saskatoon, Mitchner joined the RCAF in 1940. Completing his flying training the following year, he was sent to the United Kingdom to serve with the Royal Air Force. He was posted to No. 263 Squadron, which operated the Westland Whirlwind heavy fighter and served with this unit until June 1942, at which time he took up an instructing position before periods of service with other fighter squadrons. In November 1942, he was posted to the Canadian No. 402 Squadron where he remained for over a year, achieving a number of aerial victories. Awarded the Distinguished Flying Cross towards the end of 1943, he spent several months of the following year in Canada before returning to operations with No. 421 Squadron. More aerial victories were scored while flying in operations in support of Operation Market Garden and he was then transferred to No. 416 Squadron. By the end of the year he was commanding the squadron, remaining in this post until early 1946. He continued to serve in the RCAF in the postwar period, until 1960 when he retired for health reasons. He died four years later, aged 50.

== Early life ==
John Davidson Mitchner was born in the Saskatchewan city of Saskatoon, in Canada, on 3 July 1914. After completing his education, he worked as an accounts administrator until applying to join the Royal Canadian Air Force (RCAF) in October 1940.

== Second World War ==
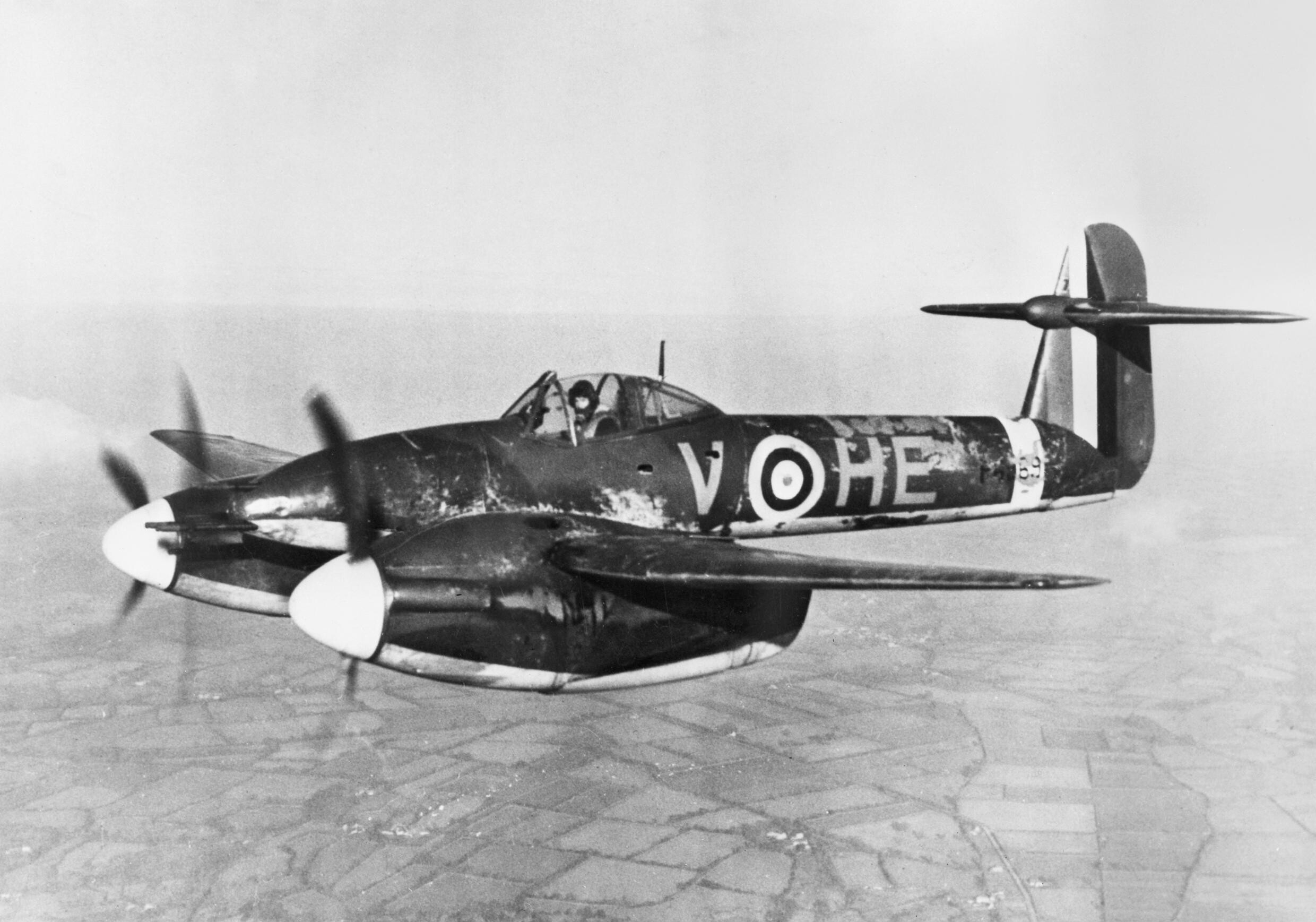
A Westland Whirlwind heavy fighter of No. 263 Squadron

Once Mitchner's flying training was completed, in July 1941 he was sent to the United Kingdom to serve with the Royal Air Force as a non-commissioned officer. Two months later he was posted to No. 263 Squadron, a Fighter Command unit that was equipped with the twin-engined Westland Whirlwind heavy fighter and based at Charmy Down. At the time Mitchner joined the squadron, it was regularly flying on offensive operations to Europe but over the winter months, it was engaged in convoy patrols. During this time Mitchner was promoted to flight sergeant.

In June 1942, Mitchner took up an instructing role at No. 55 Operational Training Unit but was only there for a month before being transferred to Mo. 247 Squadron, which was operating in a night fighter role. This was a short-lived assignment, for the following month, he was again transferred, this time to No. 116 Squadron, an anti-aircraft calibration unit.

=== Service with No. 402 Squadron ===
Mitchner returned to Fighter Command in November 1942 with a posting to No. 402 Squadron, a RCAF unit that was based at Kenley and operating the Supermarine Spitfire Mk IX fighter. Flying as part of the Kenley Wing, it was engaged in fighter sweeps and bomber escort missions to Europe. Mitchner was commissioned as a pilot officer on 12 January 1943 and five days later achieved his first aerial victory, a Focke-Wulf Fw 190 fighter that was damaged near Cabourg. In March the squadron moved north to Digby for a period of less intensive duties and training, but returned to offensive operations a few months later. Mitchner destroyed a Messerschmitt Bf 109 fighter and damaged a second while flying an operation to The Netherlands on 27 July and around this time, was promoted to flying officer. On 4 September he shot down a Bf 109 near Saint-Pol, and four days later claimed another as probably destroyed, to the north of Arras.

On 24 September 1943, Mitchner, now promoted to flight lieutenant, shared in the destruction of two Fw 190s, one confirmed and the other deemed a probable, both over the Beauvais region. He was credited with a share in another Fw 190 probably destroyed three days afterwards. He damaged a Bf 109 on 3 October and exactly a month later, destroyed two Bf 109s near IJmuiden. Shortly afterwards, he was awarded the Distinguished Flying Cross (DFC), the official announcement being made on 9 November. The published citation read:

This officer has completed a large number of sorties, including several very successful attacks on shipping. He is a most determined and able leader, whose confidence in action has proved inspiring. In combat, Flight Lieutenant Mitchner has destroyed 3 enemy aircraft.

— London Gazette, No. 36241, 9 November 1943

Mitchner achieved no further aerial victories during the remainder of his service with the squadron, which spent the winter of 1943–1944 at Digby. In February 1944, Mitchner was rested and returned to Canada for a time. Returning to the United Kingdom, after a period of duty at the RAF station at Tealing, he resumed operational flying with a posting as a flight commander at No. 421 Squadron. This was another RCAF fighter squadron which, since shortly after the invasion of Normandy, operated Spitfires from airfields in France as part of the Second Tactical Air Force. On 25 September, during the fighting in Arnhem, he destroyed a Bf 109 over the city. Later the same day, he shot down a Fw 190 near Nijmegen. Two days later he destroyed another Bf 109. At the end of the month, he was transferred to another Canadian fighter unit, No. 416 Squadron, also flying Spitfires but from Grave in The Netherlands.

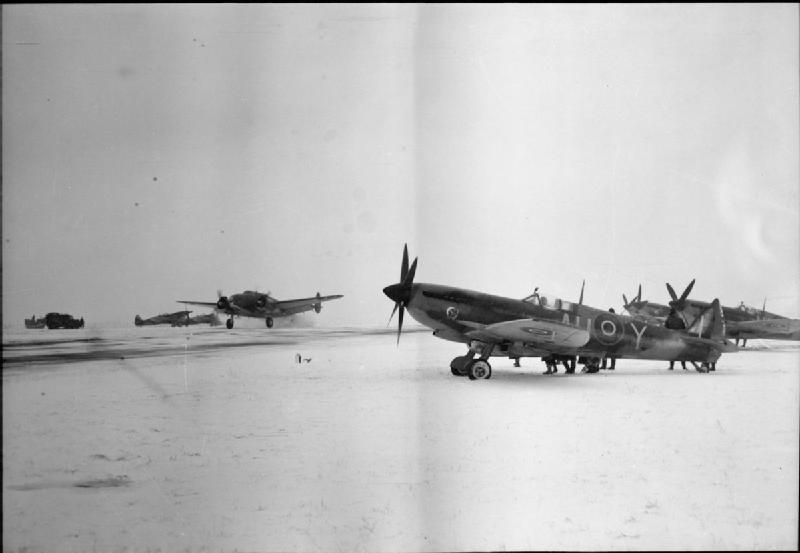
Supermarine Spitfires of No. 421 Squadron on an airfield in Belgium

=== Squadron command ===
In November 1944, Mitchner was appointed commander of No. 416 Squadron, which by this time was engaged in armed reconnaissance sorties as the Allied ground forces advanced through Belgium and into Germany. On 8 December he destroyed a Bf 109 near Munster, his final aerial victory. In July 1945, he was awarded a Bar to his DFC. The published citation read:

This officer has completed many sorties against the enemy since being awarded the Distinguished Flying Cross. He has consistently displayed a high degree of skill and determination and has been responsible for the destruction of 10 enemy aircraft. One day in April, 1945, Squadron Leader Mitchner led two armed reconnaissances, resulting in the destruction of 45 motor transport, whilst more than another 100 were damaged. His devotion to duty has been most commendable.

— London Gazette, No. 37165, 6 July 1945

After the end of the war in Europe, Mitchner continued to serve as commander of No. 416 Squadron, which was based at Ütersen in Germany as part of the British occupation force there. In recognition of valuable services rendered 'in connection with the war', the Queen of the Netherlands awarded Mitchner the Vliegerkruis (Flying Cross), the announcement being made in The London Gazette on 1 January 1946. He ended the war credited with having shot down eleven aircraft, one of which was shared with another pilot. He is also credited with one and two shared respectively as probably destroyed, and with damaging three aircraft.

== Later life ==
Mitchner relinquished command of No. 416 Squadron in January 1946 and returned to Canada two months later. He remained in the RCAF during the postwar period, becoming commander of No. 417 Squadron for two years, beginning in 1947. He attended the RCAF's Staff College in Toronto in 1951. By the end of the following year he held the rank of wing commander and, based at Uplands, was serving with No. 434 Squadron. Periods of service followed on the air bases at Sylvestre and Lac St. Denis. His health began to decline and in November 1960 he was retired from the RCAF for medical reasons. He died on 8 December 1964 in Penticton in British Columbia.
