= Casey (Camp de Base) Aerodrome =

Casey (Camp de Base) Aerodrome Casey Emergency Airstrip
- IATA: none; ICAO: none; TC LID: CSQ4

Summary
- Airport type: Private
- Operator: Stratos Aero
- Location: Casey, Quebec
- Opened: 1953 (as RCAF station)
- Closed: 1964 (as RCAF station)
- Elevation AMSL: 1,291 ft / 393 m
- Coordinates: 47°56′15″N 074°05′26″W
- Website: https://campdebasecasey.com/en/

Map
- Location in Quebec CSQ4 (Canada)

Runways
Direction	Length		Surface
Direction	ft	m	Surface
04/22	5,411	1,649	Asphalt / snow
- Operational from 1953 - 1964. Canada Flight Supplement

Casey (Camp de Base) Aerodrome (TC LID: CSQ4) is a registered aerodrome 4.6 nautical miles (8.5 km; 5.3 mi) north northeast of Hibbard near the village of Casey, Quebec.

Previously known as Casey Emergency Airstrip it is a former military airstrip and was popular as a fly-in and camping area for recreational light aircraft enthusiasts.

The aerodrome has been reopened (around 2022-2023) as a private airstrip serving as an ecotourism destination and prior permission to use it is required.

== History ==
Early during the planning of the airstrip the location was initially named McCarthy, after another nearby village on the railway. The airstrip was constructed between 1952 and 1953 by the Canadian Ministry of Transportation, as an emergency airstrip, by the request of the Department of National Defence to support the Pinetree Line. The runway was extended to 8,200 feet, after initially being built as a 6,000 foot concrete runway. The airstrip would function as a detachment of RCAF Station Parent, under the control of the Lac St. Denis Air Defence Control Centre (ADCC).

The Casey airstrip was being considered to be a home for a Royal Canadian Air Force (RCAF) squadron, and at one time considered to be a site for another BOMARC site.

The airfield was sold to a private firm in November 1964 but was then abandoned as a regulated airfield.

== Post-closure ==
In the early 1970s planes spraying for the spruce budworm used the airstrip to fill up with larvacide, fuel, and take off. On June 9, 1973 one such plane crashed on take off at the end of the runway after briefly being airborne.

In November 1992 a Convair 580, C-GGWJ, piloted by Raymond Boulanger landed after being pursued by an CF-18 fighter, was found to be loaded with 4,343 kg (9,575 lb) kilos of cocaine flown from Colombia (said to be worth C$ 2.7 billion).

Today, the airstrip is popular as a fly-in and camping area for recreational light aircraft enthusiasts.
