= YPU =

YPU may refer to:

- Puntzi Mountain Airport, former IATA airport code YPU
- Yale Political Union, a debate society at Yale University
