= CFS Foymount =

Canadian military radar station in Ontario

- RCAF Station Foymount
- Part of The Pinetree Line
- Foymount, Ontario, Canada
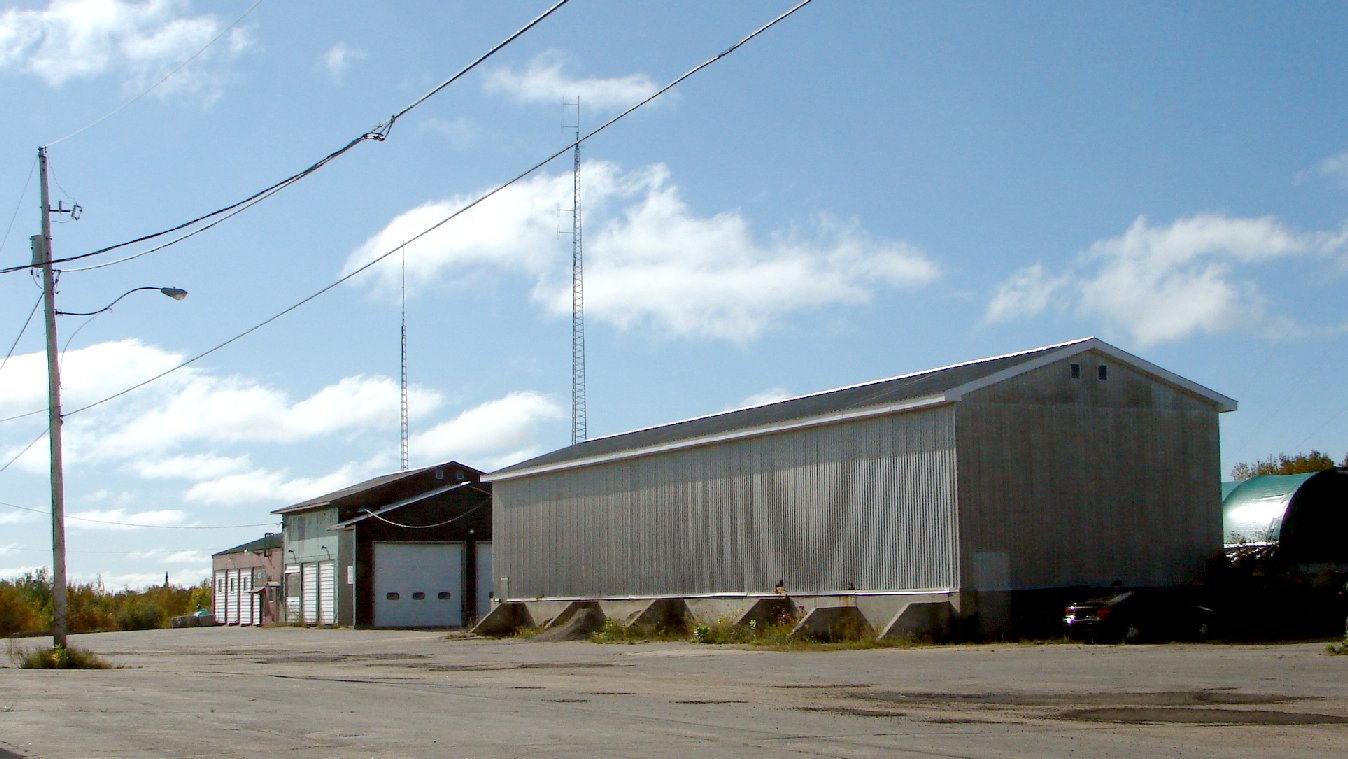
- Former base buildings (Sept. 2009)

Site information
- Code: C-3
- Controlled by: Royal Canadian Air Force
- Condition: Partially Demolished

Location
- Coordinates: 45.43034°N 77.30487°W
- Height: 1,800 feet 0 inches (548.64 m)

Site history
- Built: 1949
- Built by: Royal Canadian Air Force
- In use: 1953-1974

Garrison information
- Garrison: 203 Radar Squadron

Canadian Forces Station Foymount (CFS Foymount) was a military radar station in Foymount, Ontario, Canada, (part of Bonnechere Valley).

RCAF Station Foymount was opened in 1952 as part of the Pinetree Line of NORAD radar stations. The radar itself was situated at the top of a 523-metre hill, one of the highest points in Eastern Ontario. The main lodger unit was No. 32 Aircraft Control and Warning Squadron, later renamed No. 32 Radar Squadron when the Semi Automatic Ground Environment system was implemented in 1961.

In 1967, RCAF Station Foymount was renamed CFS Foymount with the unification of the Canadian Forces. A few years later, the base was declared redundant; radars at CFS Falconbridge and CFS Lac St. Denis were deemed sufficiently powerful to monitor Foymount's coverage area. The station was closed in 1974 and sold to private interests.

The former Foymount radio station still houses a NAV CANADA Flight information service Remote communications outlet on the property, at coordinates of approximately 45°26'00.0"N 77°18'00.0"W.
