= RCAF Station St. Sylvestre =

- Part of RCAF Air Defence Command
- Lotbinière, Quebec

Site information
- Type: PINETREE Radar Station
- Code: RCAF ADC C-6
- Controlled by: Royal Canadian Air Force

Location
- Location in Quebec
- Coordinates: 46°20′09″N 71°08′30″W

Site history
- Built: 1952
- Built by: Royal Canadian Air Force
- In use: 1953-1964
- Events: Cold War

Garrison information
- Occupants: No.13 AC&W (Radar) Squadron

Royal Canadian Air Force Station St. Sylvestre (RCAF ADC ID: C-6) was a Radar station of the Canadian Pinetree Line, located at Saint-Sylvestre, Quebec, in the Lotbinière Region, sixty-nine kilometres south Quebec City. Construction starting in 1952, the Station opened on 15 September 1953, first as RCAF Station Ste-Marie, being renamed RCAF Station St. Sylvestre, on 1 August 1955.

Announced on 16 March 1964, No.13 AC&W Radar Squadron was disbanded on 1 April 1964, with a downsizing of RCAF Air Defence Command AC&W Radar Squadrons. On 20 July 1964, the last RCAF personnel departed St. Sylvestre, given another re-alignment of the CANUS NORAD system.

== Pinetree Line ==
Plans for the Pinetree Line were first considered, as early as May 1946, as Canada worked with the United States to consider cooperative continental defence planning, against limited long-range bomber air attacks. In 1949, the United States Congress agreed to 'shared' financing the construction of a line of radar stations, across southern Canada, to enhance warning of ‘air attack’ and for the direction of fighter interceptors. Given the estimated costs in construction, maintenance and personnel, it was agreed Canada would focus on priorities in southern Ontario and Quebec, with the United States on stations in Western and Atlantic Canada.

In 1951 the locations agreed, the PINETREE Project Office established, construction of the first PINETREE Stations began in 1952, they being completed by 1954. In the Eastern Canada, the stations ran in a line essentially along the 50th parallel, St Sylvestre being an anomaly situated at 46.33 Degrees North. Amongst several reasons, the St Sylvestre radomes on Mont Sainte-Marguerite, at an altitude of 698 metres (2290 feet), on the north edge of the Appalachians, easily covered the critical approaches into the eastern United States.

As a Continental Air Defense Integration North - PINETREE Line Station, it was designated as a Category 1 (Immediate Action) Project, assigned to RCAF Air Defence Command 1 ADCC Operational Sector, having a two-hour warning mandate. The Sector's Air Defence Control Centre (No.1 ADCC) was located at RCAF Station Lac St. Denis, and it remained St Sylvestre's ‘control’ through a short history with Continental Air Defense Command, before the signing of the NORAD Agreement in May 1958, later falling under the Montreal NORAD Air Defense Sector.

== No. 13 Aircraft Control & Warning Squadron ==
Canada's early ‘Continental Radar Defence System’ stations, with both early warning detection and aircraft control functions, were initially identified with - Radio Detachments (RD) designations, they changing to - Radio Units (RU) in 1944, and later - Radio Stations (RS). No. 206 RCAF Radio Station first ran the St. Sylvestre radar functions; being renamed No. 13 Aircraft Control & Warning Squadron. No.13 AC&W Sqn was designated an early warning unit on 13 February 1954, becoming fully operational on 1 January 1955, tasked to detect enemy aircraft and guide fighter interceptors, initially from Dow AFB and Loring AFB, they south of the border in Maine.

As it was growing into its role, St Sylvestre hosted a training detachment of No. 1 Radar and Communications School, (RCAF Station Clinton), from May 1954 until May 1955. The Detachment used the Station's operational setting to carry out the ‘equipment phase’ training of RCAF Telecommunications Branch - Radar Technicians, on the operation of the GE AN/FPS-6B long-range height finding radar.

RCAF Station St. Sylvestre, Site C-6, was a Group II PINETREE Medium Radar Site, whose essential services, operations, with staffing, and their associated costs were shared with the USAF, until June 1961. As a Type C Station, it consisted of an Operations Main Building, of RCAF design, with two adjoining radar towers of similar construction, and twenty-five associated service buildings. The ‘search’ radar, with a range 75–100 km, was installed on the roof of the ‘main’ operations building and on two adjacent towers were the height finder, and a back-up ‘search’. Recurring wind damage, and winter weather, led to the housing of the radars inside 15-metre diameter inflated rubber domes.

Callsign: Eaglebeak, St. Sylvestre's operational capabilities first included (1953) a GCI Ground Controlled Intercept function, using two GE AN/CPS-6B Medium Radar, with Early Warning capability, a three-dimensional radar capable of providing range, azimuth and height of a target. In 1955, the Station installed its AN/TPS-502 (Back-up) Height Range Finder and its AN/FPS-502 (Back-up) Search Surveillance Radar. In late 1961 the GE AN/CPS-6B was replaced by a Bendix AN/FPS-20 Long Range (Search) Radar, combined with two GE AN/FPS-6B Long-Range Height Finding Radars. The Main Building radars were supported by sites on two adjacent hills designated RX (Receiver) on Mont 'Handkerchief' and TX (Emitter).

== St. Sylvestre: The Domestic Site ==
Built by H.J. O'Connell Company (Montreal), like all PINETREE Line stations, St Sylvestre was a self-contained community, with sixty ‘private married quarters’, initially five single and fifty-five double-width (single and two story) family homes, with 30 PMQs added in 1961, in a mobile home park, accommodating growth at the Station. For unmarried servicemen and women, there were the standard two-storey Combined Barracks, and a Combined Officers and Senior NCO’S Mess. There were separate buildings for two primary schools: (Hillside Schools - Innobis Confidimus: In Us Trust), a recreation centre with a bowling alley, theatre, gymnasium and swimming pool (No.8), a ‘twinned two denomination’ chapel (No.17), the sports fields, an outdoor skating rink, a 25-yard shooting range and a single line ski tow.

Supporting the ‘Main Building’ operations 'up' on Mont Ste Marguerite, was the Station Headquarters’ Administration Building (No.16), and its parade square, a one-bay fire hall (No.60), the station medical/dental hospital, a water treatment, the reservoir and distribution facility, a central heating plant, construction engineering, supply and mobile equipment shops (No.18), and the guard house, at the front entry. Commercial power for the Station was supplied by Shawinigan Water & Power Company, augmented by a power plant located, in the Main Operations Building, on Mont Ste-Marguerite.

Coming to St Sylvestre, in the early days of its operations, were a select group of ‘RCAF Auxiliary’ radar and fighter control operators from No.2450 AC&W Squadron (Auxiliary) in Sherbrooke Quebec. Covering staffing shortfalls, in maintaining 24/7 operations, these volunteers were notably active at RCAF Station St. Sylvestre, from 1955 to 1957. The conversion to the ‘automated’ SAGE system terminated the use of these ‘auxiliary volunteers’ - as they were trained exclusively for manual detection and intercept operations.

== Semi-Automatic Ground Environment (SAGE) Annex ==
In 1958, the Semi-Automatic Ground Environment (SAGE) System came to the PINETREE Line system, were ‘computers’ began to take on the routine/mundane functions in target locating. St. Sylvestre SAGE modifications began in September 1961, sufficiently large to require constructing a separate SAGE Annex. The SAGE System ‘automated’ the determination of height, speed and direction of enemy targets, and ‘directly’ relayed the target ‘data’ to the designated Sector Control Headquarters.

In May 1962, the SAGE Annex and two Ground Air Transmit Receive (GATR) Towers: ‘TX’ to the south, and ‘RX’ to the southeast, for vectoring manned interceptors, were completed. In September 1962, with reorganization, No.13 AC&W Radar Squadron began transmitting its radar coverage data to the (new) Northern NORAD Region / Bangor Air Defense Sector - Direction Center (DC-05). On 1 October 1963, it shifted its SAGE operations reporting to the Northern NORAD Region / Ottawa NORAD Sector Direction Center (an AN/FSQ-7 Direction Center at North Bay).

== Station closure announced: 16 March 1964 ==
Continuing upgrades in technology, leading to increased range and elevation coverage's, at Main PINETREE Line Stations; its neighbouring Stations, Lac St. Denis and Mont Apica, becoming able to cover its ‘sector’, St. Sylvestre was deemed redundant. From 1963, the station counting 185 military personnel and 89 civilians, No.13 AC&W Radar Squadron was disbanded on 1 April 1964, with a downsizing of RCAF Air Defence Command AC&W Radar Squadrons, and another re-alignment of the NORAD system.

Throughout its short ten-year life, St.-Sylvestre had four Commanding Officers: 1953–1954 W/C JD Mitchner DFC Bar, of Saskatoon, Saskatchewan; 1954–1957 W/C LPJ Dupuis DFC, of Ottawa, Ontario; 1957–1961 W/C JHL Lecomte DFC CdeG, of St. Theodore d’Acton, Quebec; and 1961–1964 W/C EW Smith DSO, of Metis Beach, Quebec. On 22 Jun 1964, W/C E.W. Smith DSO relinquished command of RCAF Station St. Sylvestre. On 20 July 1964, the last RCAF personnel departed the Station, many having made their way to RCAF Stn Mont Apica and RCAF Stn Moisie.
