= Beaver Bank, Nova Scotia =

Community in Nova Scotia, Canada

Beaver Bank
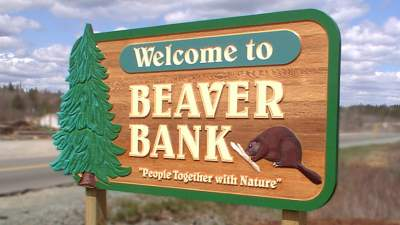
- The sign of Beaver Bank as you enter
- Motto: "People Together with Nature"
- Location within Nova Scotia
- Coordinates: 44°48′07″N 63°41′17″W
- Country: Canada
- Province: Nova Scotia
- Municipality: Halifax Regional Municipality
- Community council: North West Community Council
- District: 14 - Middle/Upper Sackville - Beaver Bank - Lucasville
- Founded in: 1776

Government
  - MP for Sackville—Preston—Chezzetcook: Darrell Samson (Lib)
  - Mayor of Halifax: Mike Savage
  - MLA for Waverley-Fall River-Beaver Bank: Brian Wong (PC)
  - Councillor of Middle/Upper Sackville - Beaver Bank - Lucasville: Lisa Blackburn

Area
  - Total: 6.14 km^{2} (2.37 sq mi)
- Demonym: Beaver Banker
- Time zone: UTC-5 (AST)
  - Summer (DST): UTC-4 (ADT)
- Postal Code: B4E, B4C, B4G
- Area code: 902
- Website: http://www.beaverbank.ca/

Beaver Bank is a community within the Halifax Regional Municipality in Nova Scotia, Canada. It is located north of Lower Sackville along Route 354, also known as Beaver Bank Road. The community’s motto is "People Together with Nature". Residents of the community are known as Beaver Bankers.

The Mi’kmaw place name for the Beaver Bank area is Nipmane'katik. The meaning of this name is not known.

== History ==
Beaver Bank dates back to the arrival of Boston loyalists in the late eighteenth century.

The first recorded land grants in the community were issued in 1798 to Andrew Blair, George and John Bond, John Hockinbul, Henry King, and John and Philip Hefler.

Following the War of 1812, several families settled in the area. By 1827, ten families were recorded in Beaver Bank, and the 1838 census reported a population of 108.

Lumbering and farming were early sources of income. The community’s first sawmill was built on the site of the present Barrett Lumber Company.

=== Transportation history ===
The stagecoach between Halifax and Sackville began service on February 14, 1815, stopping near the Old Windsor Road.

Construction of the Windsor Branch of the Intercolonial Railway began in 1854, and the Halifax–Windsor line opened on June 3, 1858. Daniel Hallisey became the first stationmaster; three generations of the Hallisey family operated Beaver Bank Station.

The station closed on March 31, 1956. The building was moved to Beaver Bank Crossroads, renovated, and later destroyed by fire in November 1967.

A prehistoric archaeological site near the former station, identified as BeCw–1, contains lithic material dating to more than 3,000 years before present.

=== Cold War period ===
Main article: RCAF Station Beaverbank

Beaver Bank was home to RCAF Station Beaver Bank, a Pinetree Line radar installation designated Site C-11. It was originally Canadian-funded and Canadian-staffed.

After its closure, the site became known as the Beaver Bank Villa and included duplex housing, a nursing home, an adult residential centre, a school, a fire station, a church, a post office, a variety store, a mobile dwelling, a rental office, and playing fields. Many of these buildings later faced significant maintenance challenges.

== Geography ==
Beaver Bank is situated in a drumlin landscape of rolling hills formed during the last glaciation. Its soils consist mainly of fine-textured loams and sandy clay loam derived from Meguma slate and greywacke.

Historically, upland areas supported yellow birch, sugar maple, and American beech, while red spruce was common on lower slopes. Modern forests in the area are generally younger and dominated by red maple, poplar, and birch.

== Demographics ==
The Beaver Bank community had a population of approximately 6,000 at the time of the 2006 census.

== Infrastructure ==
=== Ivy Meadows ===
Ivy Meadows, formerly Scotia Nursing Home, operated in Beaver Bank for over 50 years. In June 2021, Rosecrest Communities announced it would not renew its contract to provide 38 long-term care beds due to staffing challenges related to the location of the facility and the loss of bus service in 2019.

In May 2023, it was announced that Northwood would assume operations of Ivy Meadows and reopen closed spaces.

=== Transportation ===
Beaver Bank is served by Halifax Transit Routes 86 and 186, providing connections to Sackville and Halifax.

In early 2021, CN removed several sections of rail at the Beaver Bank Road/Windgate Drive crossing due to safety concerns.

== Religion ==
The first official church in Beaver Bank was the Good Shepherd Church. The land was donated by the Grove family, and funds were donated by their students. The first service was held on October 3, 1886, and the church was formally consecrated on June 17, 1890. A newer, larger building was later constructed.

== Education ==
Beaver Bank is served by three public schools within the Halifax Regional Centre for Education:

- Beaver Bank–Kinsac Elementary School (Primary–5)
- Beaver Bank–Monarch Drive Elementary School (Primary–5)
- Harold T. Barrett Junior High School (Grades 6–8)

== See also ==
- RCAF Station Beaverbank
- Lower Sackville, Nova Scotia
- Halifax Regional Municipality
