= CFS Yorkton =

Radar facility in Saskatchewan, Canada

RCAF Station Yorkton
- Part of Pinetree Line

Site information
- Type: Radar Station
- Controlled by: Royal Canadian Air Force

Location
- Coordinates: 51°17′41″N 102°36′21.5″W

Site history
- Built: 1961-1962
- In use: 1963-1986

Location of RCAF Station Yorkton, Saskatchewan

Royal Canadian Air Force Station Yorkton (ADC ID: C-51) was a Long Range Radar (LRR) and Ground Air Transmitter Receiver (GATR) facility of the Pinetree Line. The site was SAGE compatible from day one. It was located near Yorkton, Saskatchewan, Canada.

Construction was started in 1961 and the station was operational in 1963. Radar functions were operated by 46 Radar Squadron under the control of NORAD. The site was renamed Canadian Forces Station or CFS Yorkton in 1967 upon the unification of the three branches of the Canadian military into the Canadian Armed Forces. CFS Yorkton was closed in 1986 as part of the deactivation of the Pinetree Line.

The White Spruce Youth Treatment Centre took over the site as a youth addiction facility until 1998 and now is the site of Orcadia Youth Residence as a youth custody facility. A lot of the original buildings remain in good condition.
