= Pinetree Line =

Series of radar stations

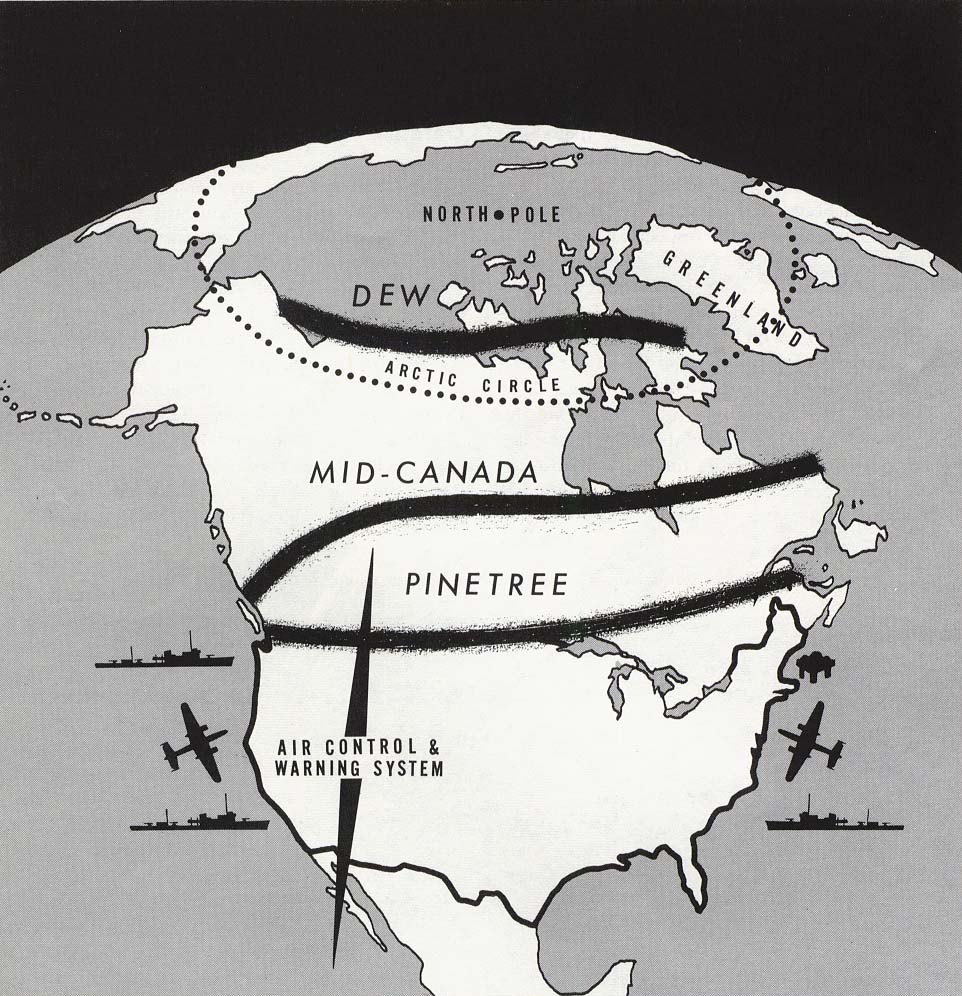
- Active: 1951–1991
- Country: Canada
- Branch: Royal Canadian Air Force; United States Air Force
- Type: Early-warning radar
- Role: Continental Air Defense
- Part of: North American Aerospace Defense Command

The Pinetree Line was a series of radar stations located across southern Canada at about the 50th parallel north, along with a number of other stations located on the Atlantic and Pacific coasts. Run by North American Aerospace Defense Command (NORAD) (after its creation), over half were staffed by United States Air Force personnel with the balance operated by the Royal Canadian Air Force. The line was the first coordinated system for early detection of a Soviet bomber attack on North America. Its radar technology quickly became outdated, and the line was in full operation only for a short time.

== History ==
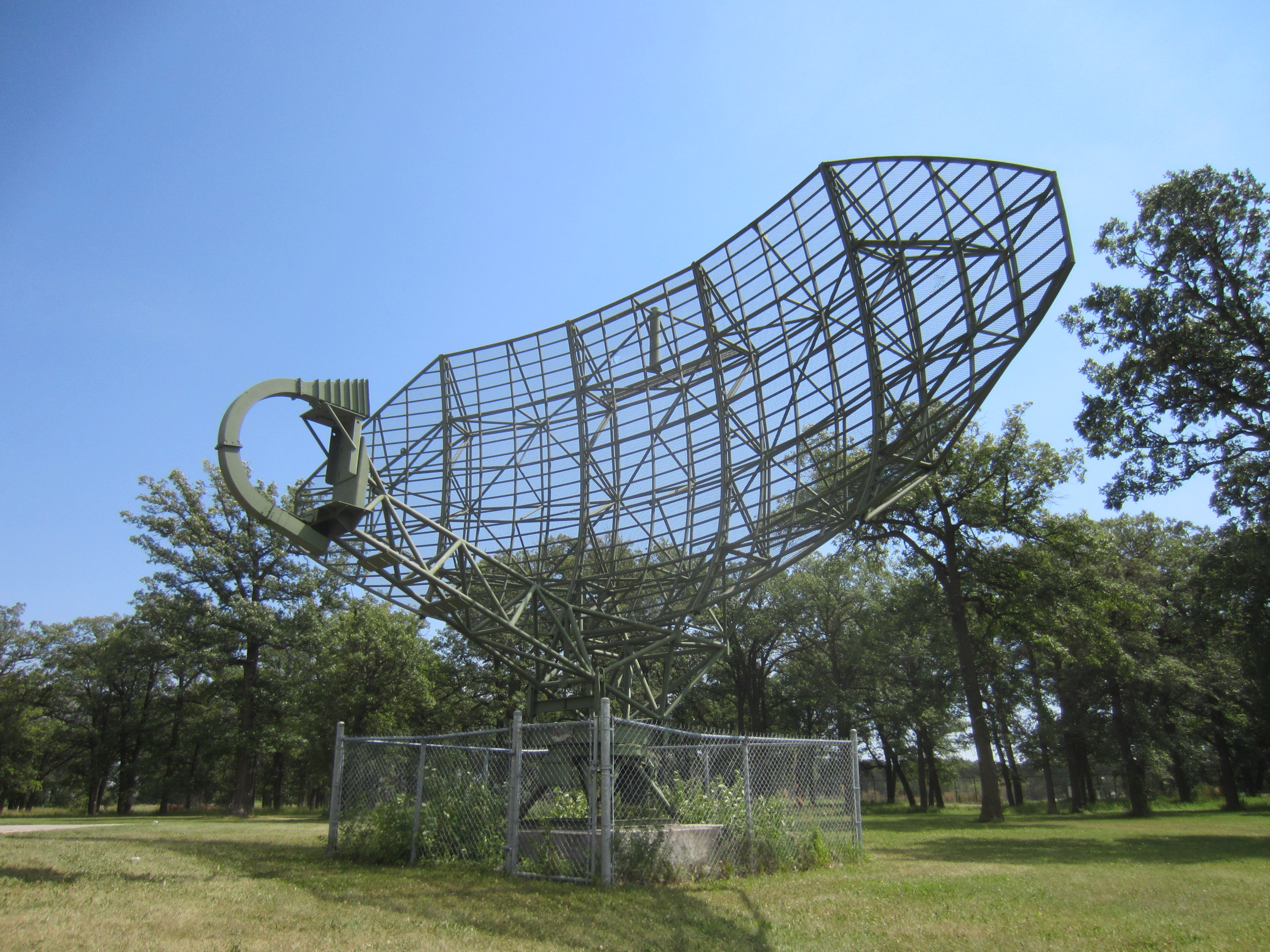
Static display of an AN/FPS 508 radar antenna, one of the types used on the Pinetree Line. The antenna rotated at 5 revolutions per minute. The system could detect aircraft up to 200 mi (320 km) away and at altitudes of 100,000 ft (30,000 m). This antenna is on display at Air Force Heritage Museum and Air Park, Winnipeg

Plans for what would become the Pinetree Line were underway as early as 1946 within the Permanent Joint Board on Defense (PJBD), a Canadian-U.S. organization. However, the costs of running such a system in the post-war era was too high, and instead Canada concentrated on the areas around Ontario and Quebec, while the United States set up stations in the Midwest and along the eastern seaboard. With the successful test of an atomic bomb in the USSR, plans changed considerably. In 1949 Congress agreed to a $161 million construction program (about $1.7 billion in 2025) in co-operation with the RCAF, for a continuous line of stations across southern Canada. The USAF's Continental Air Command and the RCAF met in October 1950 to start planning, and in January 1951 the PJBD presented Recommendation 51/1 for the Extension of the Continental Radar Defence System. The USAF later requested an additional set of six (potentially) mobile stations to provide low-level coverage. Later, it was learned the original radar systems performed better than expected, hence a number of the mobile sites were never deployed.

The system was eventually deployed as a series of 33 main stations and 6 smaller "gap fillers". The majority of these ran in a line at about the 53rd parallel in the west (to offer coverage of major Canadian cities) and about the 50th parallel in the east. A second line ran up the eastern seaboard from the southern tip of Nova Scotia to the southern tip of Baffin Island. Of these, 22 of the main stations and all of the gap fillers were paid for by the USAF, leaving 11 to the RCAF. However 16 of the main stations were staffed by RCAF personnel. On 1 January 1955, the system was officially handed over to RCAF command, and over time an additional 10 stations were added. The stations on the east coast used the Pole Vault system for communication.

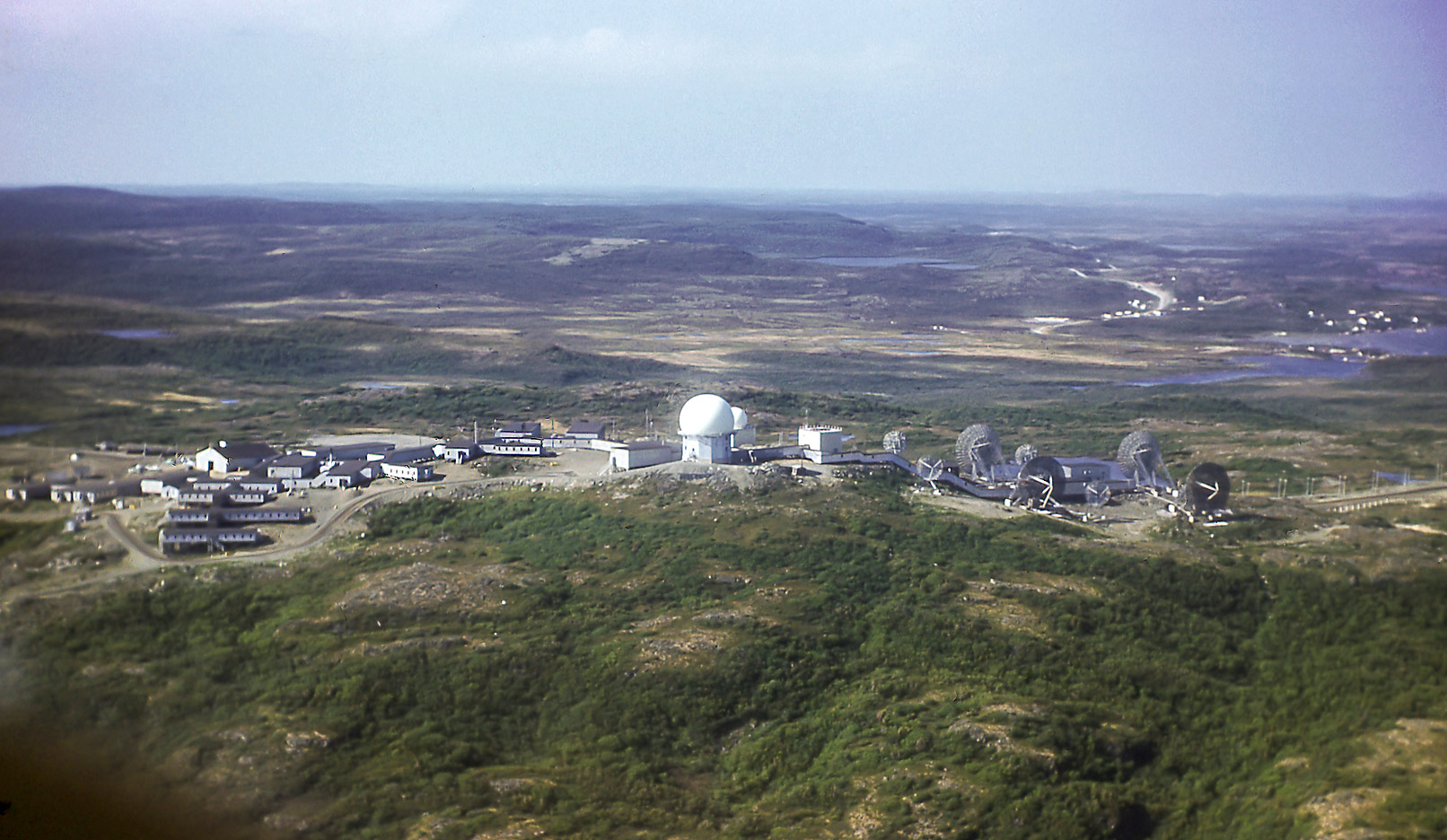
Saint Anthony Air Station, Newfoundland in July 1961. The main radar is centered, the Pole Vault antennas are on the right.

The Pinetree Line had several technical problems that limited its usefulness almost immediately. For one, the system used a simple pulse radar technique, which made it unable to detect targets close to the ground due to radar clutter as well as being trivially easy to jam using the recently introduced carcinotron tube. Another was that its location near population centres meant it offered only a last minute warning, and as the USSR moved to jet-powered bombers the warning time was reduced. Studies were already underway in 1951 to build a series of Doppler bistatic radar stations somewhat farther north, which would develop into the Mid-Canada Line. By 1957, just over a year after the Mid-Canada Line was operational, a more advanced long-range search radar, mainly in the Canadian north and Alaska were deployed comprising the Distant Early Warning Line.

The Pinetree stations were kept operational during this period, and most underwent modifications as a part of the deployment of the Semi-Automatic Ground Environment (SAGE). SAGE dramatically reduced the workload at the stations, cutting staff requirements by well over half. By the later 1950s some were being mothballed as newer systems came on line to the north. Nevertheless, many of the Pinetree stations were kept operational into the 1980s, particularly on the Atlantic and Pacific coasts.

== Radar stations ==
Initial sort is based on longitude from east to west.

Site number	Name	Province	Location	Unit	Service	Activated	Deactivated
N-22	Red Cliff Air Station; St. Johns Air Station	NL	47°38′20″N 052°40′02″W	642d Aircraft Control and Warning Squadron	USAF	1953	1961
N-22B	Elliston Ridge Air Station	NL	48°37′33″N 053°03′31″W	642d Aircraft Control and Warning Squadron	USAF	1957	1961
N-25	CFB Gander	NL	48°56′36″N 054°34′57″W	226 Aircraft Control and Warning (later Radar) Squadron	RCAF	1953	1990
N-26B	La Scie Air Station	NL	49°58′50″N 055°31′48″W	921st Aircraft Control and Warning Squadron	USAF	1957	1961
N-26	Saint Anthony Air Station	NL	51°20′57″N 055°36′39″W	921st Aircraft Control and Warning Squadron	USAF	1953	1968
N-27C	Fox Harbour Air Station	NL	52°22′12″N 055°39′52″W	922d Aircraft Control and Warning Squadron	USAF	1957	1961
N-27B	Spotted Island Air Station	NL	53°31′05″N 055°44′56″W	922d Aircraft Control and Warning Squadron	USAF	1957	1961
N-27	Cartwright Air Station	NL	53°43′28″N 056°57′51″W	922d Aircraft Control and Warning Squadron	USAF	1953	1968
N-27A	Cut Throat Island Air Station	NL	54°29′47″N 057°08′00″W	922d Aircraft Control and Warning Squadron	USAF	1957	1961
N-23	Stephenville Air Station	NL	48°35′21″N 058°39′51″W	105th Aircraft Control and Warning Squadron; 640th Aircraft Control and Warning Squadron	USAF	1952	1971
N-28A	Cape Makkovik Air Station	NL	55°13′30″N 059°08′45″W	923d Aircraft Control and Warning Squadron	USAF	1957	1961
C-34	CFS Sydney	NS	46°10′03″N 060°09′52″W	221 Aircraft Control and Warning (later Radar) Squadron	RCAF	1954	1991
N-28	Hopedale Air Station	NL	55°27′59″N 060°13′47″W	923d Aircraft Control and Warning Squadron	USAF	1953	1968
C-24	Goose Air Force Base	NL	53°19′09″N 060°25′33″W	Goose Air Defense Sector; 21st Air Division; 26th Air Division; 37th Air Division; 59th Fighter-Interceptor Squadron; 64th Air Division; 95th Strategic Wing; 4082d Strategic Wing; 4732d Air Defense Group; 6603d Air Base Group	USAF	1953	1971
N-24	Melville Air Station	NL	53°17′45″N 060°32′24″W	107th Aircraft Control and Warning Squadron; 641st Aircraft Control and Warning Squadron; 641 Aircraft Control and Radar Squadron	USAF; RCAF	1953	1988
N-29	CFS Saglek	NL	58°29′19″N 062°35′08″W	924th Aircraft Control and Warning Squadron	USAF	1953	1970
C-11	RCAF Beaverbank	NS	44°55′49″N 063°43′33″W	22 Aircraft Control and Warning (later Radar) Squadron	RCAF	1954	1964
N-30	CFS Resolution Island	NT (Note: These stations were originally in the NT but are currently located in Nunavut)	61°35′47″N 064°38′18″W	920th Aircraft Control and Warning Squadron	USAF	1951	1961
C-5	CFS St. Margarets	NB	46°54′31″N 065°12′31″W	21 Aircraft Control and Warning (later Radar) Squadron	RCAF	1953	1988
C-102	CFS Barrington	NS	43°27′06″N 065°28′17″W	672d Aircraft Control and Warning Squadron; 23 Aircraft Control and Warning (later Radar) Squadron	USAF; RCAF	1957	1990
C-33	CFS Moisie	QC	50°11′39″N 066°05′16″W	211 Aircraft Control and Warning (later Radar) Squadron	RCAF	1953	1988
N-31	Frobisher Bay Air Base	NT	63°45′21″N 068°32′23″W	926th Aircraft Control and Warning Squadron	USAF	1953	1961
C-6	RCAF St. Sylvestre	QC	46°22′04″N 071°13′51″W	13 Aircraft Control and Warning (later Radar) Squadron	RCAF	1955	1964
C-1	CFS Mont Apica	QC	47°58′41″N 071°25′51″W	12 Aircraft Control and Warning (later Radar) Squadron	RCAF	1952	1990
C-2	CFS Lac St. Denis	QC	45°56′15″N 074°18′41″W	11 Aircraft Control and Warning (later Radar) Squadron	RCAF	1952	1986
C-42	CFS Chibougamau	QC	49°56′53″N 074°20′03″W	10 Aircraft Control and Warning (later Radar) Squadron	RCAF	1962	1988
C-7	RCAF Parent	QC	47°53′15″N 074°40′09″W	14 Aircraft Control and Warning (later Radar) Squadron	RCAF	1954	1964
C-8	CFS Senneterre	QC	48°21′41″N 077°13′21″W	34 Aircraft Control and Warning (later Radar) Squadron	RCAF	1953	1988
C-3	CFS Foymount	ON	45°26′01″N 077°18′08″W	32 Aircraft Control and Warning (later Radar) Squadron	RCAF	1952	1974
C-4	CFS Edgar	ON	44°31′47″N 079°39′33″W	31 Aircraft Control and Warning (later Radar) Squadron	RCAF	1953	1964
C-10	CFS Ramore	ON	48°25′37″N 080°14′30″W	912th Aircraft Control and Warning Squadron; 35 Aircraft Control and Warning (later Radar) Squadron	USAF; RCAF	1953	1974
C-44	CFS Moosonee	ON	51°17′10″N 080°37′23″W	15 Aircraft Control and Warning (later Radar) Squadron	RCAF	1961	1975
C-9	CFS Falconbridge	ON	46°37′34″N 080°50′36″W	33 Aircraft Control and Warning (later Radar) Squadron	RCAF	1952	1986
C-119	CFS Lowther	ON	49°33′21″N 082°59′31″W	639th Aircraft Control and Warning Squadron; 36 Aircraft Control and Warning (later Radar) Squadron	USAF; RCAF	1957	1987
C-14	RCAF Station Pagwa	ON	50°01′04″N 085°15′06″W	913th Aircraft Control and Warning Squadron; 37 Aircraft Control and Warning (later Radar) Squadron	USAF; RCAF	1952	1966
C-15	CFS Armstrong	ON	50°18′19″N 089°00′49″W	914th Aircraft Control and Warning Squadron; 38 Aircraft Control and Warning (later Radar) Squadron	USAF; RCAF	1952	1974
C-16	CFS Sioux Lookout	ON	50°04′59″N 092°00′08″W	915th Aircraft Control and Warning Squadron; 39 Aircraft Control and Warning (later Radar) Squadron	USAF; RCAF	1953	1987
C-17	CFS Beausejour	MB	50°08′53″N 096°13′24″W	916th Aircraft Control and Warning Squadron; 48 Aircraft Control and Warning (later Radar) Squadron	USAF; RCAF	1953	1988
C-49	CFS Gypsumville	MB	51°39′51″N 098°44′31″W	47 Aircraft Control and Warning (later Radar) Squadron	RCAF	1962	1987
C-51	CFS Yorkton	SK	51°17′41″N 102°36′21″W	46 Aircraft Control and Warning (later Radar) Squadron	RCAF	1963	1986
C-52	CFS Dana	SK	52°16′42″N 105°46′09″W	45 Aircraft Control and Warning (later Radar) Squadron	RCAF	1964	1987
C-53	CFS Alsask	SK	51°23′31″N 110°00′12″W	44 Aircraft Control and Warning (later Radar) Squadron	RCAF	1953	1986
C-36	CFB Cold Lake	AB	54°26′05″N 110°10′47″W	42 Aircraft Control and Warning (later Radar) Squadron	RCAF	1954	1991
C-54	CFS Penhold	AB	52°11′16″N 113°34′41″W	43 Aircraft Control and Warning (later Radar) Squadron	RCAF	1964	1986
C-21	RCAF Saskatoon Mountain; CFS Beaverlodge	AB	55°13′51″N 119°18′19″W	919th Aircraft Control and Warning Squadron; 57 Aircraft Control and Warning (later Radar) Squadron	USAF; RCAF	1953	1988
C-153	CFS Kamloops	BC	50°48′08″N 120°07′36″W	825th Aircraft Control and Warning Squadron; 56 Aircraft Control and Warning (later Radar) Squadron	USAF; RCAF	1957	1988
C-20	CFS Baldy Hughes	BC	53°37′06″N 122°56′08″W	918th Aircraft Control and Warning Squadron; 54 Aircraft Control and Warning (later Radar) Squadron	USAF; RCAF	1953	1988
C-19	RCAF Station Puntzi Mountain	BC	52°09′41″N 124°12′22″W	917th Aircraft Control and Warning Squadron; 55 Aircraft Control and Warning (later Radar) Squadron	USAF; RCAF	1952	1966
C-35	CFB Comox	BC	49°42′39″N 124°53′12″W	51 Aircraft Control and Warning (later Radar) Squadron	RCAF	1954	1958
C-36	RCAF Tofino	BC	49°04′55″N 125°46′51″W	52 Aircraft Control and Warning Squadron	RCAF	1955	1957
C-18	CFS Holberg	BC	50°38′25″N 128°07′48″W	501 Aircraft Control and Warning (later Radar) Squadron; 53 Radar Squadron	RCAF	1954	1991

== See also ==
- List of Royal Canadian Air Force stations
- United States general surveillance radar stations
- Radar Station, a 1953 short documentary about the Pinetree Line
- Continental Air Defense Integration North
- Continental Air Defense Command
