= RCAF Station Parent =

- Part of the Pinetree Line
- Parent, Quebec, Canada

Site information
- Code: C-7
- Controlled by: Royal Canadian Air Force
- Condition: Derelict

Location
- Location of RCAF Station Parent
- Coordinates: 47.88741°N 74.66925°W

Site history
- Built: 1951
- Built by: Royal Canadian Air Force
- In use: 1953-1964

Garrison information
- Garrison: 14 Aircraft Control and Warning Squadron

RCAF Station Parent was a Canadian early warning radar station and formed part of the Pinetree Line air defence network. Ground was broken in 1951, and by 1954 the station was operational. 14 Aircraft Control & Warning (AC&W) Squadron was the lodger unit operating the facility. In 1963 the station was moved to Semi-Automatic Ground Environment (SAGE) operation; in 1964 it closed, as it was deemed redundant with more powerful radar stations coming online in the sector.

== Present day ==
Nothing remains of the operational installation other than the foundations, guard rails, and paved parking lot at the top of the mountain. A communications antenna has been erected at the site of the original operations building. Some of the buildings at the domestic site below, where station personnel lived, are still inhabited. Supporting buildings such as the hospital, sewage treatment facility, and mess hall have long been demolished and removed; only their foundations remain.

== See also ==
- List of Royal Canadian Air Force stations
