= RCAF Station Edgar =

- Part of the Pinetree Line
- Edgar, Ontario, Canada

Site information
- Code: C-4
- Owner: Private
- Controlled by: Royal Canadian Air Force
- Open to the public: No
- Condition: Demolished

Location
- Location of RCAF Station Edgar
- Coordinates: 44.53070°N 79.65957°W

Site history
- Built: 1952
- Built by: Royal Canadian Air Force
- In use: 1952-1964
- Demolished: 2011

Garrison information
- Garrison: 31 Aircraft Control and Warning Squadron

RCAF Station Edgar was part of the Pinetree Line of radar stations and was located at Edgar, Ontario, Canada, about 20 km (12 mi) northeast of Barrie. Built in 1952, the site was home to the 31st Aircraft Control and Warning Squadron and was operational in its intended role until 1964, when the complex was sold to the provincial government of Ontario in November for CA$218,225 and was used as an Adult Occupational Centre for developmentally disabled or handicapped adults until its closure in 1999. The base consisted of 84 residences, two office buildings, a swimming pool, bowling alley, baseball diamond, hospital, church and a school. As a part of the deinstitutionalization program, the government began shutting down all its institutions and by 1999, the Edgar Adult Occupational Centre was completely shut down. The Ontario Provincial Police then assumed use of the old recreational hall for instruction. They had been using the base off and on for police training and a number of other functions. In 1999, the government attempted to sell the 628,300 m^{2} (155¼ acre) site to Nishnawbe Homes for $2.95 million, an organization dedicated to building respectable communities for first-nations people, but this deal fell through. From its 1999 closure until its 2011 demolition, the base sat mostly unused, except for occasional use by military and police as a training centre, including being the rehab centre for Canada's Worst Driver 3 in 2007. Despite the site being idle, there is 24/7 security posted at the gatehouse making the site inaccessible to the public. In July 2011, a developer purchased the remainder of the property for $2,500 and by the fall of 2011, all the buildings had been demolished. Developer Miya Consulting plans to build 82 houses on the property. As of 2021, the land is being redeveloped and a new subdivision called "Eagles Rest Estates" is currently being built.
