= CFS Moosonee =

Former Canadian Forces Station in Ontario

- RCAF Station Moosonee
- Part of The Pinetree Line
- Ontario, Canada

Site information
- Code: C-44
- Controlled by: Royal Canadian Air Force
- Condition: Derelict

Location
- Location of CFS Moosonee
- Coordinates: 51.286111°N 80.622222°W

Site history
- Built by: Royal Canadian Air Force
- In use: 1961–1975

Garrison information
- Garrison: 15 Aircraft Control and Warning Squadron

Canadian Forces Station Moosonee (CFS Moosonee) was a military installation located in Moosonee, Ontario.

RCAF Station Moosonee was opened in 1962 as part of NORAD's Pinetree Line chain of radar stations. Moosonee was one of five stations built to close radar coverage gaps in the original Pinetree system. The base was originally operated by the Royal Canadian Air Force's 15 Aircraft Control and Warning Squadron, later redesignated 15 Radar Squadron.

In 1967, RCAF Station Moosonee was renamed CFS Moosonee with the unification of the Canadian Forces. The base was closed in 1975 as a cost-saving measure. Some buildings were used by the Town after the closure, including the base swimming pool and recreation centre.

== Sources ==
- Ozorak, Paul. Abandoned Military Installations of Canada: Volume I: Ontario. 1991. ISBN 0-9695127-1-6.
- A History of the Air Defence of Canada, 1948-1997. Commander Fighter Group. 1997. ISBN 978-0-9681973-0-1.
