= RCAF Station Penhold =

Former Military aircrew training facility in Alberta, Canada

- Near Penhold, Alberta in Canada
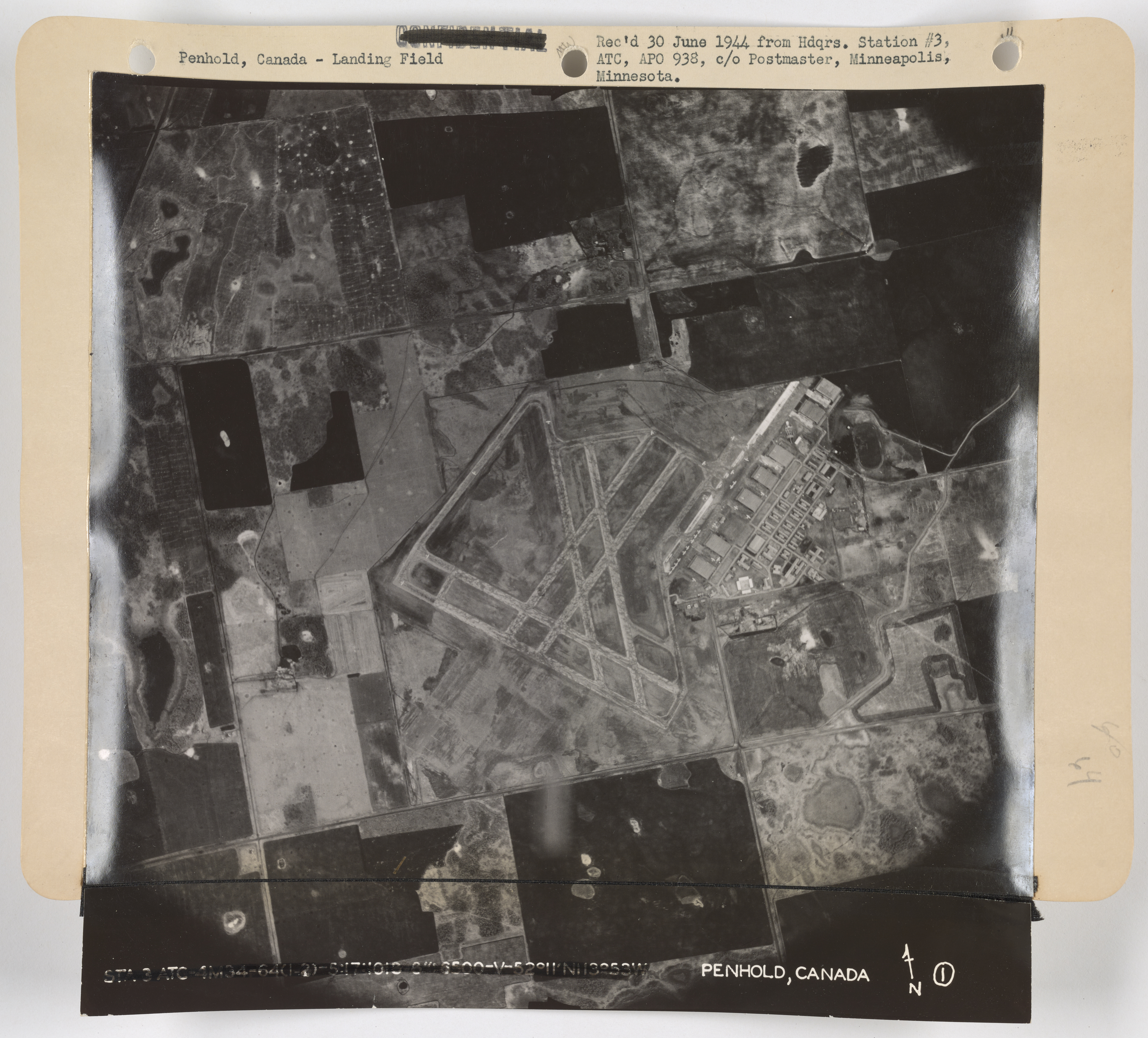

Site information
- Owner: Dept of National Defence (Canada)

Location
- Location within Alberta
- Coordinates: 52.177°N 113.890°W

Site history
- In use: 1941–1944;

Garrison information
- Occupants: No. 36 SFTS (1941–1944)

Airfield information
- Elevation: 2,950 ft (900 m) AMSL
Runways
Direction	Length and surface
2/20	3,000 ft (910 m) Hard Surface
2/20	2,970 ft (910 m) Hard Surface
16/34	2,950 ft (900 m) Hard Surface
16/34	3,270 ft (1,000 m) Hard Surface
11/29	3,180 ft (970 m) Hard Surface
11/29	2,930 ft (890 m) Hard Surface

RCAF Station Penhold was a Second World War British Commonwealth Air Training Plan (BCATP) station located near Penhold, Alberta, Canada.

== History ==
=== World War II ===
In 1939, farmland was purchased and land cleared for the future base. In 1940 the base opened as a Royal Canadian Air Force (RCAF) Manning Depot with one building. Five hangars and 31 other buildings were under construction well into 1941 including barracks, service buildings and administrative buildings. Six hard surfaced runways 900 to 1075 metres long made up the airfield. Two additional hangars were built for a total of seven. In August 1941, the base was handed over to the Royal Air Force and on 28 September 1941, No. 36 Service Flying Training School was transferred from Britain. It was one of several schools established as part of the British Commonwealth Air Training Plan. The school was disbanded on 3 November 1944. and the base was officially handed back to the RCAF who began the process of closing the base. The station was operated and administered by the Royal Canadian Air Force (RCAF).

==== Aerodrome information ====
In approximately 1942 the aerodrome was listed at 52°11′N 113°54′W with a Var. 24.5 degrees E and elevation of 2,850 ft (870 m). Six runways were listed as follows:|}

Runway Name	Length	Width	Surface
2/20	3,000 ft (910 m)	100 ft (30 m)	Hard surfaced
2/20	2,970 ft (910 m)	100 ft (30 m)	Hard surfaced
16/34	2,950 ft (900 m)	100 ft (30 m)	Hard surfaced
16/34	3,270 ft (1,000 m)	100 ft (30 m)	Hard surfaced
11/29	3,180 ft (970 m)	100 ft (30 m)	Hard surfaced
11/29	2,930 ft (890 m)	100 ft (30 m)	Hard surfaced

=== Relief landing field – Innisfail ===
The primary Relief Landing Field (R1) for RCAF Station Penhold was located northwest of the community of Innisfail. For more information please see Innisfail Aerodrome

=== Relief landing field – Blackfalds ===
The Secondary Relief Landing Field (R2) for RCAF Station Penhold was located west of the community of Blackfalds, it was located at 52°23′09″N 113°54′13″W

=== Cold War ===
It re-opened in 1952 as a RCAF flying school training pilots for member countries of the North Atlantic Treaty Organization. The airfield closed in 1965 and in 1966, the City of Red Deer took over its operation, naming it the Red Deer Industrial Airport. The station was also home to a Pinetree Line radar station and the provincial emergency government headquarters bunker for the province of Alberta.

The remainder of the base continued in operation as CFB Penhold, although it was downgraded to a detachment of CFB Edmonton in 1990. In 1994 the base was decommissioned and closed.

=== Post closure ===
Mynarski Park, the residential portion of the base, was renamed Springbrook in 1995 when private developers purchased the lands from the Department of National Defence. The operational area of the base near the airfield was sold to a different developer which referred to the area as Harvard Park. In 1999, airfield operations were taken over by the newly-created Red Deer Regional Airport Authority, a partnership of the City of Red Deer, Red Deer County, and the Red Deer Chamber of Commerce. The Royal Canadian Air Cadets operated the Penhold Air Cadet Summer Training Centre at the former base until the Centre was closed in 2014.

== Present day ==
The aerodrome is now operated as the Red Deer Regional Airport.
