= RCAF Station St. Margarets =

- CFB Chatham, St. Margarets Detachment
- Part of Pinetree Line
- New Brunswick, Canada

Site information
- Code: C-5
- Controlled by: Royal Canadian Air Force

Location
- Location of RCAF Station St. Margarets
- Coordinates: 46.90903°N 65.2092°W

Site history
- Built: 1950
- Built by: Royal Canadian Air Force
- In use: 1953-1988
- Demolished: Yes

Garrison information
- Garrison: 21 AC&W Squadron

RCAF Station St. Margarets is a former Royal Canadian Air Force station and later a Canadian Forces detachment located in the community of St. Margarets, New Brunswick.

It was operational as a Pinetree Line radar station from November 1953 to April 1988 and as a satellite tracking station from 1975 until its closure in 1989. It was involved in Operation Skyshield II in October 1961 which involved tracking "Enemy and Friendly aircraft engaged in a North American wide mock air battle. Personnel from this station and others involved were restricted to base until 16 October 1961 resulting in some personnel postponing personal plans such as weddings.

Today the facility has been renamed to James Park in honour of Air Vice-Marshal Arthur Lorne James. James Park is operated by a local development authority which has sold or rented many of the residential units. Most of the military buildings have been demolished since the facility was decommissioned in 1989.

== History ==
The Royal Canadian Air Force selected the community of St. Margarets for the location of a radar station in the early 1950s to close a key gap in air defence coverage. RCAF Station St. Margarets was constructed on what was then called the Old Yellow Road, today Highway 11, approximately 5 km (3.1 mi) northwest of the county line between Northumberland County and Kent County and approximately 20 km (12 mi) southeast of the air base at RCAF Station Chatham. Construction began in 1951 under general contractor Diamond Construction and it went operational on November 1, 1953, as part of the Pinetree Line network of radar stations when the ground control intercept operation was moved from RCAF Station Chatham.

During the 1950s and 1960s, RCAF Station St. Margarets was staffed by approximately 300 RCAF personnel and supported by approximately 100 civilians. Its location was designed to provide coverage of a large portion of the western Gulf of St. Lawrence as well as northeastern Maine, New Brunswick and Prince Edward Island to complement RCAF operated Pinetree Line stations at RCAF Station Moisie to the north, RCAF Station St. Sylvestre to the west, RCAF Station Beaverbank and RCAF Station Barrington to the south, and RCAF Station Sydney to the east. The United States Air Force also operated four Pinetree Line stations further east at Stephenville, St. Anthony, Gander and St. John's on Newfoundland.

Radio callsigns used by the St. Margarets radar station throughout its operation from 1953 to 1988 included "MOHAWK", "BROMIDE", "CHOPSTICK", "MIDWIFE" and "BILLYBOY".

The St. Margarets station consisted of several radomes housing the early warning and ground control intercept radars, as well as supporting buildings including residences for personnel and a school. The primary lodger unit established at the station was No. 21 Aircraft Warning Squadron; this unit formed at RCAF Station Chatham on November 21, 1952, while the station was under construction and moved to St. Margarets on October 15, 1953. The station was operationally controlled by Sector Commander 2 ADCC, RCAF Station Chatham and was part of the Fredericton Sector of the Pinetree Line.

In August 1957 a new school was opened by the RCAF for children of personnel. It was named James Park School in honour of recently retired Air Vice-Marshal Arthur Lorne James. The Post Office Department had established a post office at RCAF Station St. Margarets in 1954 named "Post Office RCAF St. Margarets." The name of this post office was changed in 1966 to "Post Office James Park" following the death of Air Vice-Marshal Arthur Lorne James in 1964.

Search radars installed at the facility included models AMES-11, FPS-3, FPS-502, and FPS-508. No. 21 Aircraft and Warning Squadron was renamed to No. 21 Radar Squadron on May 8, 1958. That year saw the implementation of a partnership between the USAF and RCAF to form the North American Aerospace Defence Command or NORAD; consequently many Pinetree Line radar stations were upgraded for automation and consolidation of intercept data. RCAF Station St. Margaret's radar equipment underwent an upgrade in the late 1950s and early 1960s with the operational implementation of the Semi-Automatic Ground Environment (SAGE) System on November 1, 1963. Under SAGE, the St. Margarets station collected, discriminated and transmitted its radar coverage data to the designated SAGE Control Centre in the Bangor NORAD sector at Topsham AFS.

Air bases at RCAF Station Chatham and Loring AFB in Maine were the nearest bases for interceptor aircraft that would respond to anything detected by the St. Margarets main radar. The SAGE upgrade in 1963 also saw RCAF Station St. Margarets become the designated Back Up Intercept Control - One (BUIC I) for the Bangor NORAD sector. This evolved to become a BUIC II site in 1966 which lasted until the end of 1968.

== CFB Chatham, St. Margarets Detachment ==
On February 1, 1968, the RCAF merged with the Royal Canadian Navy (RCN) and the Canadian Army to form the Canadian Armed Forces. As part of the unification, many isolated radar stations comprising the Pinetree Line, Mid-Canada Line and DEW Line were renamed to become separate Canadian Forces Stations using the prefix "CFS". However, in the case of RCAF Station St. Margarets, the facility's proximity to the air base at RCAF Station Chatham saw this particular radar station realigned to become a detachment of the base. The air base was renamed CFB Chatham, thus the radar station was renamed to CFB Chatham, St. Margarets Detachment.

Under the BUIC III program, the St. Margarets facility was assigned to become a BUIC NORAD Control Centre (BNCC) in 1969. This saw No. 21 Radar Squadron renamed to No. 2 BNCC Squadron. By 1972, BUIC was winding down and St. Margarets became the only BNCC within the 22nd NORAD Region.

In 1974 the St. Margarets facility was selected as the site for a Satellite Tracking Unit (SITU) as part of Air Defence Command - reorganized into Air Command that year. The SITU formed on July 7, 1975, at St. Margarets and supported NORAD's space defence role to collect, analyze and transmit satellite tracking data to the NORAD Space Object Identification Centre at NORAD headquarters in the Cheyenne Mountain Operations Center (CMOC) at the Cheyenne Mountain Complex, Colorado. The SITU used a Baker Nunn satellite tracking camera system and this was augmented in 1978 by the Space Object Identification Telescope.

Through the early 1980s the St. Margarets facility functioned as the controlling site of the 22nd NORAD Region until the consolidated Regional Operational Control Centre (ROCC) for the realigned Canadian NORAD Region at CFB North Bay in August 1984. At that time St. Margarets reverted to simply a long-range radar site (in addition to the SITU) as its BUIC function was phased out.

In 1985 the Department of National Defence announced that the Pinetree Line would be closed. The final day of operations for the radar equipment at St. Margarets was April 1, 1988. The SITU was relocated from the facility in 1989 and the property was decommissioned and declared surplus.
