= Cape Makkovik Air Station =

General Surveillance Gap Filler Radar station

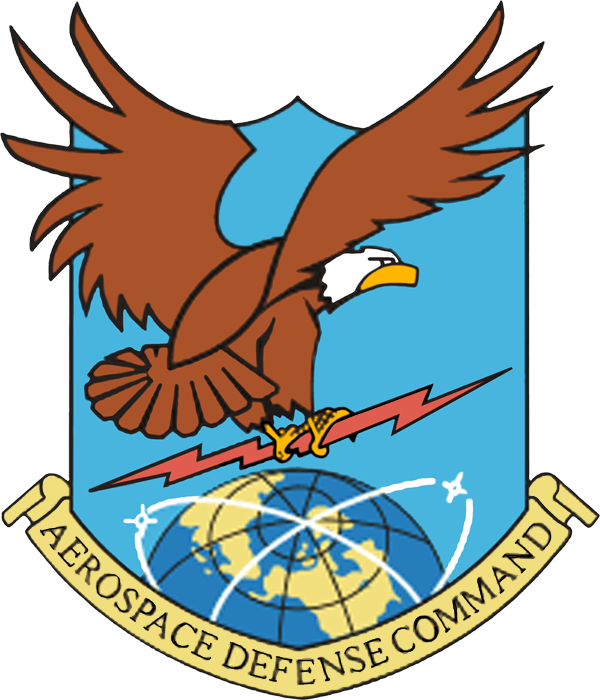
Cape Makkovik Air Station
- Part of Pinetree Line
- Labrador, Canada
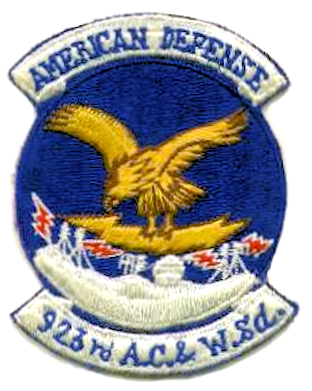

Site information
- Type: Radar Station
- Code: N-28A
- Controlled by: Aerospace Defense Command

Location
- Coordinates: 55°13′30″N 059°08′45″W

Site history
- Built: 1957
- Built by: United States Air Force
- In use: 1957-1961

Location of Cape Makkovik Air Station, Labrador

Cape Makkovik Air Station (ADC ID: N-28A) was a General Surveillance Gap Filler Radar station in the Canadian province of Newfoundland and Labrador, It was located 140 miles (230 km) north-northeast of CFB Goose Bay. It was closed in 1961.

== History ==
The site was established in 1957 as a manned Gap Filler radar station, built by the United States Air Force, under operational control of Hopedale Air Station and part of Pinetree Line of Ground-Control Intercept (GCI) radar sites.

The station was assigned to Aerospace Defense Command in 1957, and was given designation "N-28A" (later "C-28A)." Aerospace Defense Command stationed the 923d Aircraft Control and Warning Squadron at the station in 1957. It operated an AN/FPS-14 manned Gap Filler search radar.

== USAF units and assignments ==
Units:

- Activated as 923d Aircraft Control and Warning Squadron at Grenier AFB, New Hampshire, 13 June 1953

Moved to Hopedale Air Station, 1 October 1953
Inactivated 1961.

Assignments:

- 4732d Air Defense Group (ADC), 1 April 1957
- Goose Air Defense Sector, 1 April 1960
