= Trenton Aerodrome =

- IATA: none; ICAO: CYTN

Summary
- Airport type: Public
- Owner: Sobeys Incorporated
- Operator: Trenton Airport Limited
- Serves: Trenton, Nova Scotia
- Time zone: AST (UTC−04:00)
  - Summer (DST): ADT (UTC−03:00)
- Elevation AMSL: 319 ft / 97 m
- Coordinates: 45°36′43″N 062°37′16″W
- Website: www.town.trenton.ns.ca

Map
- Location in Nova Scotia CYTN (Canada)

Runways
Direction	Length		Surface
Direction	ft	m	Surface
06/24	5,377	1,639	Asphalt
- Source: Canada Flight Supplement

Trenton Aerodrome (ICAO: CYTN) is a registered aerodrome located adjacent to Trenton, Nova Scotia, Canada. Since October 2006, the airport has been owned by Sobeys Incorporated.

== History ==
=== 1929–1939 ===
The airport began in 1929 as a private operation by a group of local pilots. In June 1932 the 320 ft (98 m) grass strip was officially opened with the landing of a de Havilland Gypsy Moth by Canadian aviation pioneer, Jimmy Wade. Later that year Jim Mollison, on his east to west crossing of the Atlantic Ocean landed at the airport, which was later named after him.

=== 1939–1945 ===
==== Aerodrome ====
In approximately 1942 the aerodrome was listed as RCAF Aerodrome - New Glasgow & Trenton, Nova Scotia at 45°37′N 062°37′W with a variation of 24 degrees west and elevation of 300 ft (91 m). The field was listed as "turf field" and had two runways listed as follows:

Runway name	Length	Width	Surface
9/27	3,250 ft (990 m)	300 ft (91 m)	Turf
14/32	3,950 ft (1,200 m)	300 ft (91 m)	Turf

=== 1945–present ===
In 1950, the airport left private ownership and became the property of the town of Trenton. In 2006, municipal officials felt "the town of about 2,700 could no longer afford to maintain the airport and its facilities." After searching for a buyer the only bidder was Sobeys Capital Incorporated, the airport's principal user.

Notable visitors to the airport include several prime ministers and other politicians as well as Babe Ruth, Bill Clinton, Queen Elizabeth and Prince Philip.
