= Hopedale Air Station =

General Surveillance Radar station

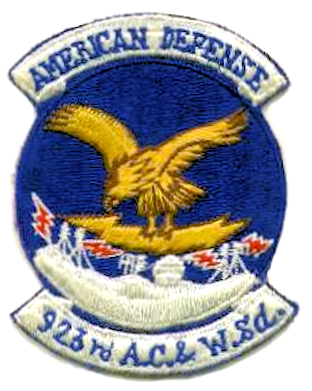
Hopedale Air Station
- Part of Pinetree Line; Mid-Canada Line
- Hopedale, Newfoundland and Labrador, Canada
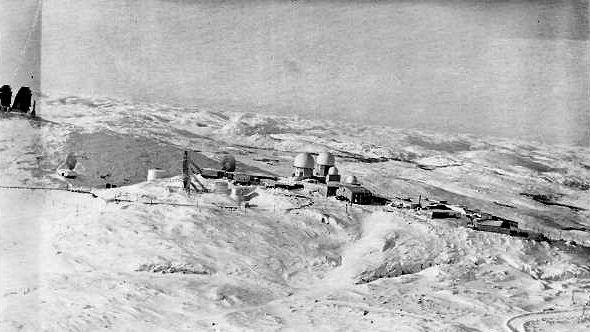
- Station in the mid 1960s

Site information
- Type: Radar Station
- Code: N-28
- Owner: USAF
- Controlled by: Northeast Air Command; Aerospace Defense Command
- Condition: abandoned

Location
- Coordinates: 55°27′59″N 060°13′47″W

Site history
- Built: 1953
- Built by: United States Air Force
- In use: 1953-1968

Location of Hopedale Air Station, Labrador

Hopedale Air Station (ADC ID: N-28) is a General Surveillance Radar station that the USAF closed in 1968. It is located north of the community of Hopedale, Newfoundland and Labrador 147.8 miles (237.9 km) west-northwest of CFB Goose Bay, Newfoundland and Labrador, Canada.

== History ==
The site was established in 1953 as a General Surveillance Radar station, funded by the United States Air Force. It was used initially by the Northeast Air Command as part of the Pinetree Line, which stationed the 923d Aircraft Control and Warning Squadron at the station on 1 October 1953.

The station was reassigned to the USAF Air Defense Command on 1 April 1957, and was given designation "N-28". The station functioned as a Ground-Control Intercept (GCI) and warning station. As a GCI station, the squadron's role was to guide interceptor aircraft toward unidentified intruders picked up on the unit's radar scopes. These interceptors were assigned to the 64th Air Division at Goose AFB, Labrador.

It operated the following radars:

- Search Radars: AN/FPS-3C, AN/FPS-502, AN/FPS-87A, AN/FPS-93A
- Height Radars: AN/TPS-502, AN/FPS-6B, AN/FPS-90

In addition to the main facility, Hopedale operated an AN/FPS-14 manned Gap Filler sites:

- Cape Makkovik Air Station (N-28A): 55°13′30″N 059°08′45″W

N-28A was built in 1957 about 50 miles east-southeast of the main station and was closed in 1961. It was serviced year round by a helicopter landing pad midway between the dock and the main site and by a small dock where supply ships apparently provided logistical support to the station during the summer months.

USAF Military Personnel stationed at Hopedale lived in barracks interconnected and guyed into the bedrock. Canadian non-military personnel lived in the village of Hopedale, about half a mile south-southeast of the site. An airstrip on Ribback Island provided air support to the station. There was no airstrip support for the site in 1964. The squadron was inactivated on 18 June 1968, and the station was closed on 30 June. All US Air Force personnel lived in barracks at the station itself. There were three "tiers" of barracks: Enlisted, NCO and Officer. There were a few Canadian nationals employed at the base. They lived in the village of Hopedale.

In 2009, a serious PCB contamination was identified at the former Hopedale station.

Other than civil communications towers presently in use, the hilltop site has remained largely unused and abandoned since its closure. It is accessible via a maintained gravel road originating from the village of Hopedale, NL. This road branches into two directions: southwest to the former radar station site and north to the former barracks. Large concrete foundations remain intact at both locations.

== USAF units and assignments ==
Units:

- Activated as 923d Aircraft Control and Warning Squadron at Grenier AFB, New Hampshire, 13 June 1953

Moved to Hopedale Air Station, 1 October 1953
Inactivated 18 June 1968.

Assignments:

- 64th Air Division (NEAC), 1 October 1953
- 4732d Air Defense Group (ADC), 1 April 1957
- Goose Air Defense Sector, 1 April 1960
- 37th Air Division, 1 April 1966 – 18 June 1968

== Mid-Canada Line ==
In 1956, a bistatic radar transmitter was constructed at Hopedale as the Sector Control Station (Site 200) for the Mid-Canada Line.

== North Warning System ==
Since 1992, the Canadian Forces have operated a Short Range Radar facility at a nearby site, as part of the North Warning System.

== See also ==
- List of USAF Aerospace Defense Command General Surveillance Radar Stations
