= CFS Sydney =

Former Canadian Forces Station in Nova Scotia

- Part of The Pinetree Line
- Nova Scotia, Canada

Site information
- Code: C-34
- Controlled by: Royal Canadian Air Force
- Condition: Repurposed

Location
- Location of CFS Sydney
- Coordinates: 46.16738°N 60.16469°W

Site history
- Built: 1952
- Built by: Royal Canadian Air Force
- In use: 1953-1990

Garrison information
- Garrison: 211 Radar Squadron

Canadian Forces Station Sydney, also known as CFS Sydney, is a former Canadian Forces Station located in the community of Lingan Road, Nova Scotia.

It was operational as a Pinetree Line radar station from April 1954 to January 1991.

For Information on the World War II, RCAF Aerodrome located near Sydney, Nova Scotia please see Sydney/J.A. Douglas McCurdy Airport

== RCAF Station Sydney ==
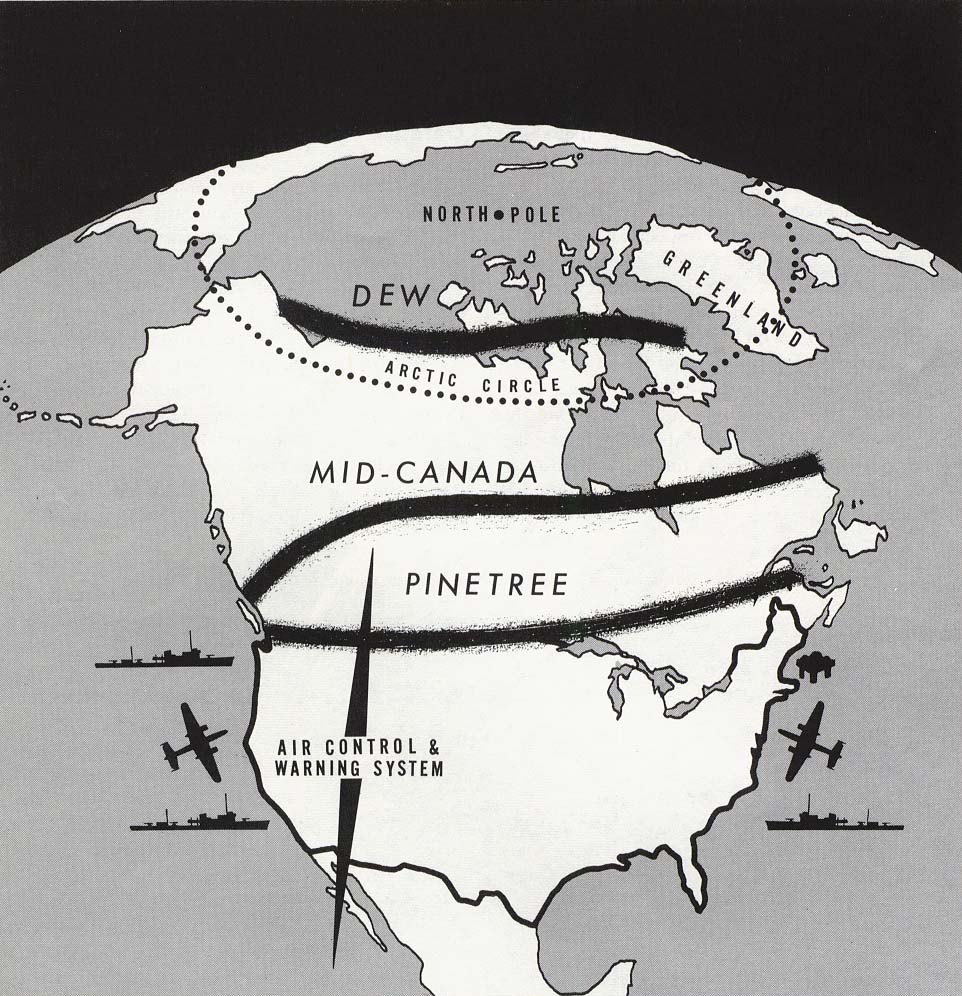
A rough map of the three warning lines. From north to south: Distant Early Warning (DEW) Line, Mid-Canada Line, and Pinetree Line.

The Royal Canadian Air Force constructed RCAF Station Sydney in Lingan Road along the northwest municipal boundary of the City of Sydney, opening in April 1954 as part of the Pinetree Line network of radar stations. The location of the station on a low ridge along the eastern shore of Sydney Harbour provided coverage of a large portion of the Cabot Strait and the south coast of Newfoundland to complement USAF operated Pinetree Line stations at Stephenville, Gander and St. John's to the northeast. Sydney's coverage was backed up by RCAF Station Beaverbank and RCAF Station Barrington to the southwest and RCAF Station St. Margarets to the west.

Using the radio callsign "PEPPER", the Sydney station consisted of a radome housing the early warning and ground control intercept radars, as well as supporting buildings including residences for personnel. The primary lodger unit established at the station was No. 221 Aircraft Warning Squadron; this unit formed at Sydney on August 1, 1953, while the station was under construction. Search radars installed included models FPS-3, FPS-27, and FPS-508.

No. 221 Squadron was operationally controlled by Sector Commander 2 ADCC, RCAF Station Chatham. The RCAF air base at Chatham and the USAF's Ernest Harmon AFB in Stephenville were the nearest bases for interceptor aircraft that would respond to anything detected by the Sydney main radar.

Following the 1958 partnership between the USAF and RCAF to form the North American Aerospace Defence Command or NORAD, many Pinetree Line radar stations were upgraded for automation and consolidation of intercept data. Consequently, RCAF Station Sydney's radar equipment underwent an upgrade in the late 1950s and early 1960s with the operational implementation of the Semi-Automatic Ground Environment (SAGE) System on September 15, 1962. Under SAGE, the Sydney station collected, discriminated and transmitted its radar coverage data to the designated SAGE Control Centre in the Bangor NORAD section at Topsham AFS.

== CFS Sydney ==
On February 1, 1968, the RCAF merged with the Royal Canadian Navy (RCN) and the Canadian Army to form the Canadian Armed Forces. As part of the unification, RCAF Station Sydney was renamed to Canadian Forces Station Sydney, or CFS Sydney.

The end of the Cold War and obsolescence of the Pinetree Line radar stations saw CFS Sydney's radar cease operations on January 17, 1991.

The station was decommissioned by the Canadian Forces in 1992 whereby the Government of Canada transferred the property to the Government of Nova Scotia. It was subsequently transferred to the Municipality of the County of Cape Breton which established a non-profit development company named New Dawn Enterprises Ltd. to market the buildings and residences for civilian use. New Dawn Enterprises Ltd. saw limited success in seeing alternative uses for the facility, partly due to the economic decline of the Industrial Cape Breton region.

In 2004 it was discovered that an above-ground fuel storage tank at the former CFS Sydney site was leaking. A subsequent investigation by the Department of National Defence identified 35 other underground fuel storage tanks on the property, some of which were also leaking. These tanks had not been revealed at the time of the facility's transfer in 1992. DND has committed to cleaning up the site and remediating any resulting soil contamination.

== Canadian Coastal Radar ==
The main radar operations building of CFS Sydney was repurposed for one of three East Coast Canadian Coastal Radar (CCR) sites and still stands today. The one remaining system is operating, an RCAF operated, minimally attended AN/FPS-117, and commits radar information to NORAD. The rest of the site was torn down, and is currently being cleaned. A welding school, retirement home, Curling club, CBRM water storage and civilian homes still stand.
