= ALG Wormhout =

ALG Wormhout was the Advanced Landing Ground home base of 'B' Flight, 665 (AOP) Squadron RCAF, which operated from April to June, 1945 during Second World War. The base was located twelve miles southeast of Dunkirk, France.

For more than six weeks, the five Auster Mark V aircraft of 'B' Flight operated from ALG Wormhout. Initially, the aircraft were tasked with directing Czech Army artillery gunfire onto targets in the Dunkirk area. After the surrender of Dunkirk on May 9, 1945, the Flight was tasked with communication and VIP flight duties in support of First Canadian Army.

Royal Canadian Artillery Captain Horace Trites was the Flight Commander of 'B' Flight, 665 (AOP) Squadron, RCAF; the other four pilots in the Flight included Captain Jean-Louis Lamy, Captain Beverly Dane Baily, Captain Bill Milliken, and Captain F.R.'Ray' Irwin.

Captain Irwin and his observer, Gunner R.D. 'Ray' Knight, are credited with having been the last Canadians to fire a hostile shot in the European theatre of Second World War, on May 7, 1945.
