= Continental Air Defense Integration North =

Continental Air Defense Integration North (CADIN) was a Cold War program to develop military installations in Canada for the air defense of North America using the Semi Automatic Ground Environment already being deployed in the CONUS. CADIN was a revision of the 1955 Operation Pillow for a "Fourth Phase Radar Program" to "extend the combat zone northward" with additional radars in Canada (neither country had approved the program by 1958.) After the 25 July 1958 NORAD plan included a single SAGE sector in Canada, Canada's Minister of National Defense proposed increased Canadian manning on the DEW Line, a right granted by the May 1955 US-Canada agreement. In December 1958 NORAD also approved 52 Canada radars with Frequency Diversity for FY61-63, and the initial 5 January 1959 CADIN cost sharing agreement was for 2 CIM-10 Bomarc squadrons, 7 heavy radars, 45 gap fillers, an Air Defense Direction Center, and SAGE upgrades for 25 existing radars (e.g., Beaver Lodge, Moisie, and Sydney). The USAF and RCAF approved on 13 July 1959 the construction of the Ottawa Super Combat Center to be "fully operational on 1 July 1963" to control BOMARC missile sites to be completed in 1962 at LaMacaza and North Bay. The cost sharing was for $305 million (USAF) and $135 million (RCAF) that included "tying into...32 ground-to-air radio sites."

The schedule for CADIN gap-filler radar stations included those for "P-20F, London, Ontario; C-4-C, Brampton. Ontario; C-5-C, Mt Carleton, New Brunswick; and C-6-D, Les Etroits. Quebec" (in the spring of 1959, ADC requested the Air Defense Systems Integration Division to study accelerating the scheduled 1962 deployment of those 4 sites.) Super Combat Centers and solid-state AN/FSQ-32s were cancelled in 1960 and on March 22, 1960, the United States Secretary of Defense authorized an IBM AN/FSQ-7 Combat Direction Central (BOMARC ground equipment) be provided for CADIN instead of an AN/FSQ-32. The planned North Bay nuclear bunker was started in 1959 and completed in 1963.
