= Melville Air Station =

Radar station in Newfoundland and Labrador, Canada 1953–1988

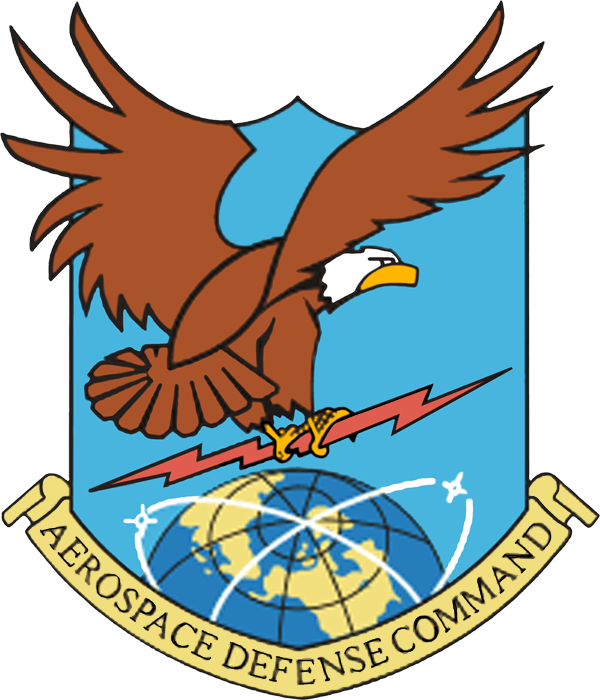
Melville Air Station
- Part of Pinetree Line
- Labrador, Canada
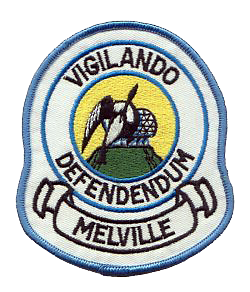

Site information
- Type: Radar Station
- Code: N-24
- Controlled by: Northeast Air Command; Aerospace Defense Command

Location
- Coordinates: 53°17′44.90″N 060°32′22.59″W

Site history
- Built: 1953
- Built by: United States Air Force
- In use: 1953-1988

Location of Melville Air Station, Labrador

Melville Air Station (ADC ID: N-24) was a General Surveillance Radar station. It was located on the summit of Dome Mountain, 5.4 miles (8.7 km) west of CFB Goose Bay, Newfoundland and Labrador. It was closed in 1988.

== History ==
The site was established in 1953 as a General Surveillance Radar station, funded by the United States Air Force. It was used initially by the Northeast Air Command, which stationed the 641st Aircraft Control and Warning Squadron on the station on 1 November 1957. The station functioned as a Ground-Control Intercept (GCI) and warning station. As a GCI station, the squadron's role was to guide interceptor aircraft toward unidentified intruders picked up on the unit's radar scopes.

It was equipped with the following radars:

- Search Radar: AN/FPS-3C, AN/FPS-502, AN/FPS-20A, AN/FPS-87A, AN/FPS-93A, AN/CPS-6B
- Height Radar: AN/TPS-502, AN/FPS-6B, AN/FPS-90

The station was reassigned to the USAF Air Defense Command on 1 April 1957, and was given designation "N-24".

In 1971, the USAF transferred control of the site to the Canadian Forces. It was closed in 1988.

== USAF units and assignments ==
Units:

- 641st Aircraft Control and Warning Squadron, Activated at Grenier Air Force Base, New Hampshire 26 May 1953

Moved to Melville Air Station, 1 November 1957
Discontinued 30 June 1971

Assignments

- 64th Air Division, 1 August 1953
- 4732d Air Defense Group, 1 April 1957
- Goose Air Defense Sector, 1 April 1960
- 37th Air Division, 1 April 1966
- 21st Air Division, 31 March 1970 – 30 June 1971
