= RCAF Station Beaverbank =

RCAF Station Beaver Bank
- Part of the Pinetree Line
- Nova Scotia, Canada
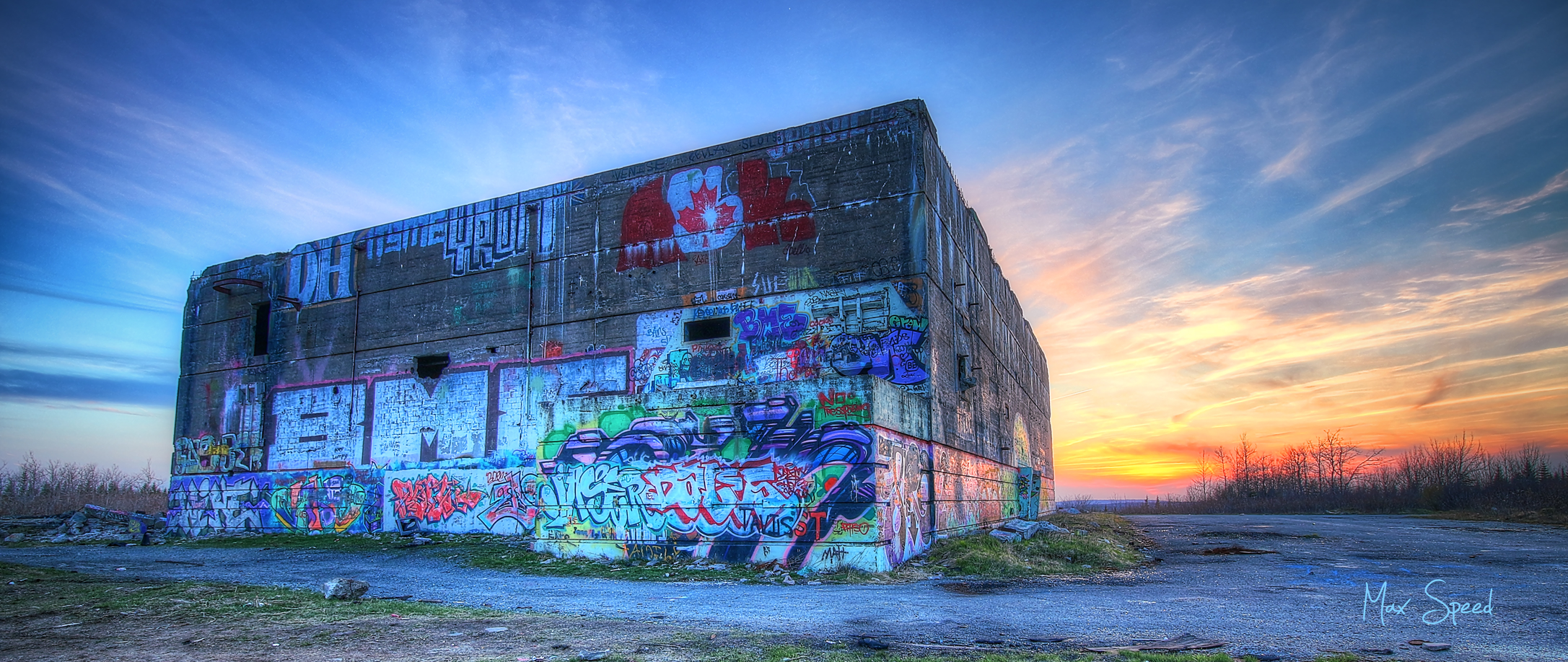

Site information
- Code: C-11
- Controlled by: Royal Canadian Air Force
- Condition: Derelict

Location
- Location of RCAF Station Beaver Bank
- Location within Nova Scotia
- Coordinates: 44.91353°N 63.72572°W

Site history
- Built: 1953
- Built by: Royal Canadian Air Force
- In use: 1954-1964

Garrison information
- Garrison: 22 Aircraft Control and Warning Squadron

RCAF Station Beaver Bank was a long-range Pinetree Line early warning radar station operated by the Royal Canadian Air Force, located in central Nova Scotia near the community of Beaver Bank. The site is now known as Beaver Bank Villa.

== Base history ==
RCAF Station Beaver Bank is located approximately 40 km (25 mi) north of the municipality of Halifax. The station sat on 430 acres (1.7 km^{2}) with about a half a mile (800 m) separation between the domestic and the operations site; both sites being divided by the county line between Halifax County (domestic site) and Hants County (operations site).

The 22 Aircraft Control & Warning Squadron was the operational unit posted to the station, its colours having been created in 1953 and the unit made operational a year later in the fall of 1954. The radar unit itself was manually operated and reported to the Fredericton NORAD Sector at RCAF Station St. Margarets until September 1962 when this was changed to the Bangor NORAD Sector at Topsham AFS.

The 22 AC&W became SAGE-operational on January 1, 1964, however this capability did not last long as the station was closed and the squadron disbanded 4 months later on April 1, 1964, following a NORAD realignment and increasing focus being placed on the DEW Line. After the closure of the base, it had been used briefly as a cement factory.

RCAF Station Beaver Bank occupied a unique location in proximity to Canada's largest Atlantic seaport and its biggest naval base, making it an important early warning radar during the manual environment of the 1950s. Since crewed bomber raids by the Soviet Union in the area were considered quite likely, it was felt that RCAF Station Beaver Bank fulfilled a critical role in the early days of Canada's and North America's air defence. The station was originally financed by the United States Air Force, although operational responsibility rested with the RCAF, until 1962 when the RCAF assumed financial responsibility as well.

== Beaver Bank Villa ==
In the mid-70s the base was converted to a concrete plant. This was only used for a few years before the base was abandoned, then resold. The base headquarters were turned into a nursing home called Ivy Meadows which is run by the Rosecrest family. The retirement home still stands, though the surrounding area is abandoned and most of the other buildings were demolished in 2004.
