= CFS Mont Apica =

Radar station in Quebec, Canada

RCAF Station Mont Apica

Site information
- Type: Radar Station
- Code: C-1
- Controlled by: Royal Canadian Air Force

Location
- Coordinates: 47°58′41″N 071°25′51″W

Site history
- Built: 15 July 1952
- Built by: Royal Canadian Air Force
- In use: 1952-1990

Location of RCAF Station Mont Apica, Quebec

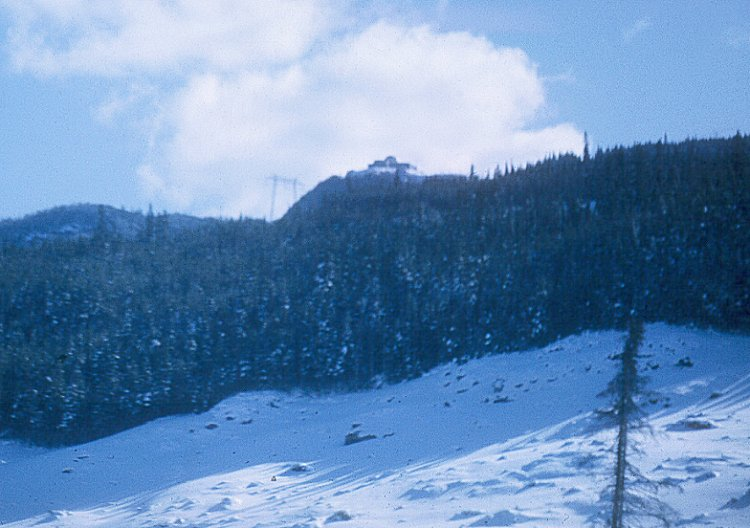
Radar station on top of Mont Apica

Canadian Forces Station Mont Apica (CFS Mont Apica) was a radar station of the Pinetree Line, located in Mont-Apica, Quebec, Canada, during the Cold War. The station opened as RCAF Station Mont Apica in 1952 and had a staff of some 500 persons at its peak.

2452 AC&W squadron, a reserve unit from Quebec City, trained at Mont Apica until the squadron was disbanded in 1960.

Political and technological changes made the station redundant and it closed in 1990. No. 12 Radar Squadron, Mont Apica's lodger unit, was transferred to CFB Bagotville.

There was also a weather radar used by the military and later by the Meteorological Service of Canada. After the station's closure, it was transferred to the Lac Castor site of the Canadian weather radar network.
