= Puntzi Mountain Airport =

- IATA: none; ICAO: CYPU

Summary
- Airport type: Public
- Operator: Ministry of Forests, Lands and Natural Resource Operations Provincial Airtanker Centre
- Location: Puntzi Mountain, British Columbia
- Time zone: PST (UTC−08:00)
  - Summer (DST): PDT (UTC−07:00)
- Elevation AMSL: 2,985 ft / 910 m
- Coordinates: 52°06′46″N 124°08′41″W

Map
- Location in British Columbia

Runways
Direction	Length		Surface
Direction	ft	m	Surface
05/23	6,012	1,832	Asphalt
- Source: Canada Flight Supplement

Puntzi Mountain Airport (ICAO: CYPU) is located 17 nautical miles (31 km; 20 mi) west of Puntzi Mountain, British Columbia, Canada.

== History ==
The airport was established in 1951 to provide access to a radar station of the Pinetree Line. It was the second-longest airstrip in British Columbia at the time. Thirteen Caterpillar D8 bulldozers were on site to keep the runway graded and, in winter, cleared of snow. There were 100 American servicemen and a few Canadian servicemen, some with families, staffed the base at Puntzi, which also hired local Tsilhqotʼin people.

An automatic weather station has been in operation at the airport since March 1993.
