= CFS Falconbridge =

Military radar station in Ontario, Canada

- RCAF Station Falconbridge
- Part of The Pinetree Line
- Sudbury, Ontario, Canada

Site information
- Code: C-9
- Owner: Private
- Controlled by: Royal Canadian Air Force
- Open to the public: No
- Condition: Partially repurposed, partially derelict

Location
- Coordinates: 46.62619°N 80.84378°W

Site history
- Built by: Royal Canadian Air Force
- In use: 1952-1985

Garrison information
- Garrison: 33 Aircraft Control and Warning Squadron

Canadian Forces Station Falconbridge (CFS Falconbridge) was a military radar station in the Canadian province of Ontario, active from 1952 to 1985.

The station was geographically located in Valley East, Ontario, although the nearest settlement — and the source of the station's name — was the community of Falconbridge in Nickel Centre. The site is now within the municipal boundaries of Greater Sudbury.

== History ==
CFS Falconbridge was opened as RCAF Station Falconbridge in 1952 as part of NORAD's Pinetree Line of radar stations. The original operating unit was No. 33 Aircraft Control and Warning Squadron, later renamed No. 33 Radar Squadron when aircraft monitoring functions were transferred to Regional Headquarters in Duluth, Minnesota. In 1967, the base was renamed Canadian Forces Station Falconbridge with the unification of Canada's military into the Canadian Forces.

The station's operational call sign was Tomboy.

In 1975, a detachment of CFB North Bay's Air Weapons Control and Countermeasures School opened in Falconbridge. Instruction was provided in target plotting, weapons control and radar anti-jamming techniques.

A visual and radar UFO incident occurred in the community on November 11, 1975, later reported in a press release by NORAD. The object was tracked on radar from the base and sighted in binoculars, and estimated to be a 100-foot diameter sphere with craters. Seven OPP police officers also witnessed the UFO. Some explanations given for the sightings included Venus, clouds, and/or weather balloons.

CFS Falconbridge was closed when the Pinetree Line was declared redundant in the mid-1980s. The station was sold to Pine Ridge Developments, a private real estate developer, in 1987 for $1.9 million. The residential part of the base is now a commercial rental housing development, and the radar operations building was torn down in 2007. Pine Ridge faced some criticism in 2003 for making only minimal safety improvements to the base's badly deteriorated former barracks and mess hall despite having rented out homes on the site to tenants with children.
