= CFS Lac St. Denis =

Former Canadian Forces Station in Quebec

Site information
- Type: Radar Station
- Code: C-2
- Controlled by: Royal Canadian Air Force

Location
- Coordinates: 45°56′06″N 074°18′30″W

Site history
- Built: 1952
- Built by: Royal Canadian Air Force
- In use: 1952-1986

Location of CFS Lac St. Denis in Quebec

Canadian Forces Station Lac St. Denis (also CFS Lac St. Denis) is a former Canadian Forces Station that was located by Lac St. Denis, 60 miles north of Montreal in the Laurentian Mountains.

== Construction ==
The base, at 1674 feet above sea level, was 315 feet higher in elevation than the town one mile away. Lac St. Denis was midway between Morin Heights and St. Adolphe d'Howard on highway 329.

The radar station (Site C-2, callsigns Largo, Firefly and Crystal) was one of the oldest of the Pinetree Line sites. Construction had begun in 1949. During this time, there was a veil of secrecy imposed by the RCAF as to the real reason for the site. This sparked rumours and speculation among the local inhabitants, including one that the RCAF was building air defence weapons in a huge underground hangar.

== RCAF Station Lac St. Joseph ==
An advance party arrived to open up No. 202 RCAF Radio Station Lac St. Joseph, as it was known in March 1952. It officially opened the following month, and was fully operational by July of the same year. On September 15, 1952, 1 AC&W Squadron transferred its headquarters from RCAF Station St. Hubert to Lac St. Denis. In October 1952, the site became RCAF Station Lac St. Denis while 202 RCAF Radio Station became 11 AC&W Squadron. At the same time, 1 AC&W Squadron was re-designated 1 Air Defence Control Centre and remained as such until its disbandment, as the Montreal NORAD Sector, on 15 September 1962.

The station terminated manual operations on 15 September 1962 when it was SAGE capable, and began to report to the Bangor Sector at Topsham AFS, Maine. In September 1963, 11 AC&W began reporting to the Ottawa Sector at CFB North Bay. At one time a detachment of 1 Radar and Communications School RCAF Station Clinton Ontario were training enlisted personnel as Fighter Control Operators at the station. In September 1965, a new basic trade school to train Air Defence Technicians was formed to meet the forecast trade shortage. By 1973, over 25 courses had been run with almost 500 graduates.

11 AC&W was the operation responsible for the control of all test flights of the CF-104 Starfighters being built at Canadair in Montreal. The aircraft would leave the Cartierville Airport and proceed to the testing area under positive control of Lac St. Denis.

== CFS Lac St. Denis ==
The station, operating as 11 Radar Squadron, changed its name on 10 August 1967 to Canadian Forces Station Lac St. Denis (CFS Lac St. Denis) as a result of unification. In March 1972, CFS Lac St. Denis became a detachment of the North Bay-based Air Weapons Control and Countermeasures School (AWC&CS). Eventually Lac St. Denis acquired the Air Weapons Control and Countermeasures School and they carried on training Air Defence Technicians for two more years. The school was later moved to CFS Falconbridge and then to its current location at North Bay, Ontario.

The Canadian NORAD Region's ROCCs, both Canada East and Canada West, commenced operations in August 1984, with Lac St. Denis attached to Canada East.

== Closure ==
The station carried on with its assigned duties until it ceased operations in December 1985. CFS Lac St. Denis was closed on 1 August 1986.

Since then various business ventures have tried using the site without ever achieving any long-term success. The site is now abandoned, left open and easily accessible. The old concrete shell, graffiti-covered and in desolate state after fires and water infiltration, is often visited by paintball and Airsoft enthusiasts.

== See also ==
- Radar Station, a 1953 short documentary shot at CFS Lac St. Denis
