= LeBourdais =

LeBourdais is a surname. Notable people with the surname include:

- D. M. LeBourdais (1887–1964), Canadian non-fiction writer
- Isabel LeBourdais (1909–2003), Canadian journalist and writer
- Linda LeBourdais (born 1945), Canadian politician in Ontario
- Louis LeBourdais (1888–1947), Canadian politician in British Columbia

== See also ==
- Sébastien Bourdais (born 1979), French racing driver
