= Keith Simpson (pathologist) =

English forensic pathologist

Cedric Keith Simpson (20 July 1907 – 21 July 1985) was an English forensic pathologist. He was Professor of Forensic Medicine in the University of London at Guy's Hospital, Lecturer in Forensic Medicine at the University of Oxford and a founding member and President of the British Association in Forensic Medicine. Simpson became renowned for his post-mortems on high-profile murder cases, including the 1949 Acid Bath Murders committed by John George Haigh and the murder of gangster George Cornell, who was shot dead by Ronnie Kray in 1966.

He pioneered forensic dentistry, and was prominent in alerting physicians and others in 1965 to a previously under-diagnosed form of child abuse that he termed battered baby syndrome (and, from 1967, battered child syndrome). Simpson wrote a standard textbook on forensic science and edited Taylor's Medical Jurisprudence, a basic work of reference of the British medical profession. Forty Years of Murder was Simpson's autobiography and became an international best-seller in the late 1970s. He was London's first forensic pathologist to be recognised by the Home Office, and in 1975 his long public service was recognised with the award of a CBE. Simpson had by then gained the reputation of having performed more post-mortems than any other pathologist in the world.

== Career ==
Keith Simpson was born in 1907 in Brighton, Sussex, where his father was a general practitioner. In August 1924, aged 17, Simpson enrolled at Guy's Hospital Medical School. By the age of 25 he was a teacher in the Pathology Department. In 1934 Simpson was made Supervisor of Medico-legal Post-Mortems and had his first case with Scotland Yard. In 1937 he was appointed Medico-legal advisor to Surrey Constabulary.

In 1947 the student textbook Forensic Medicine, which Simpson wrote during the war, was published. Following the death of Bernard Spilsbury in the same year, Simpson became one of the leading forensic pathologists in Britain, with a string of important cases. In 1950, along with Francis Camps, Donald Teare and Professor Sydney Smith, Simpson formed the Association of Forensic Medicine.

In 1963 he was elected to the Royal College of Pathologists. Two years later, Simpson addressed the annual meeting of the NSPCC and spoke on the topic of 'battered babies'.

In addition to his scientific publications, popular works such as his 1978 autobiography Forty Years of Murder made his name familiar to the public.

He practised medicine from 146 Harley Street and Guy's Hospital.

== Famous cases ==
- 1942 Rachel Dobkin was murdered by her husband, Harry. His blunder was to pour slaked lime on the body, which helped preserve it, rather than quicklime which would have corroded it.
- 1942 Joan Pearl Wolfe, victim of August Sangret in the "Wigwam murder".
- 1943 The Bethnal Green tube station disaster.
- 1946 Margery Gardner, murdered by Neville Heath.
- 1946 Consultant for the Surrey Police on the "Chalk-pit Murder".
- 1948 The death of Ananda Mahidol, King Ananda of Siam, Simpson's first case outside Britain, when a Major-General of the Police of Siam asked his help interpreting what had happened.
- 1948 The "Gorringe case", in which Simpson used forensic odontology (the identification of an individual from their teeth and bite marks) to seal a murder conviction against Robert Gorringe for the murder of his wife Phyllis, one of the first recorded instances of such evidence being used in an English court. The crucial factor was that Phyllis died quickly, before bruising could distort the bite-marks. The death sentence on Gorringe was commuted and he was released on licence in 1957.
- 1949 After searching through fatty sludge, Simpson found gallstones, bones and dentures that identified Olive Durand Deacon as a victim of the "Acid Bath Murderer", John George Haigh.
- 1953 Exhumation of Beryl Evans after John Christie confessed to her murder. Simpson acted for Christie, observing the exhumation and post-mortem, which was performed by Francis Camps.
- 1956 Instructed by the Medical Defence Union in the defence of John Bodkin Adams, acquitted of murdering one of his patients.
- 1961 Michael Gregsten and Valerie Storie, victims of James Hanratty, the "A6 murderer".
- 1964 The Lydney Murder, a body later identified as Peter Thomas found near Lydney, and a significant case in the development of entomology for criminal investigation.
- 1965 The conviction of Laurence Dean for the murder of his son Michael was the first in England for "battered baby syndrome" and greatly raised awareness of the condition in Britain.
- 1966 George Cornell, victim of the Kray twins.
- 1967 Invited by the Canadian government to review the case of Steven Truscott after publication of the book The Trial of Steven Truscott on the case by Isabel LeBourdais.
- 1972 After Bloody Sunday, invited to re-examine the post mortem findings. Simpson agreed that the victims had been picked off by single shots, from distance, some from behind. He also agreed that six might themselves have fired guns; the later Saville Enquiry did not substantiate this.
- 1974 Sandra Rivett, victim of Lord Lucan.
- 1974 Mama Cass.
- 1975 Leslie Newson, driver in the Moorgate tube crash.
- 1982 Roberto Calvi, Vatican banker. The cause of death was asphyxia by hanging from Blackfriars Bridge.

== Awards and affiliations ==
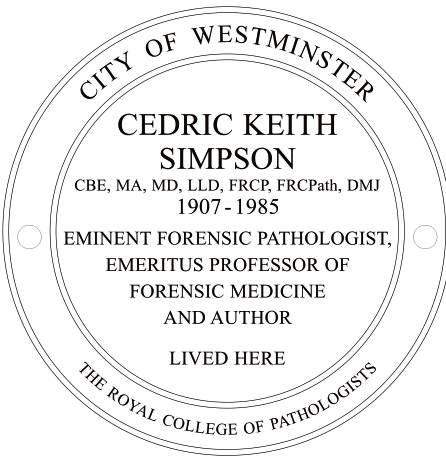
Keith Simpson Westminster Green Plaque

Simpson was a member of many medical organisations, one of the founders of the British Association in Forensic Medicine, a former president of the Medico-Legal Society, and a member of the council of the Royal College of Pathologists and the Medical Protection Society. He was the only London forensic pathologist to be recognised as a Home Office pathologist and was a member of the Home Office Scientific Advisory Committee. A fellow of the Royal College of Physicians and the Royal College of Pathologists, Simpson received honorary degrees from the universities of Oxford, Edinburgh and Ghent. His long public service was recognised with the award of a CBE in 1975. In June 2012, Simpson was honoured with the installation of a Westminster City Council Green Plaque at his former residence at 1 Weymouth Street, Marylebone.

== Family life ==
Cedric Keith Simpson was born in 1907 near Brighton, Sussex, where his father was a GP. He attended Brighton, Hove and Sussex Grammar School and at 17 he enrolled at Guy's Hospital Medical School where he became a top student. In 1932 Keith Simpson married Mary Buchanan, with whom he had three children. They were together until Mary's death from multiple sclerosis in 1955. Simpson married his secretary, Jean Scott-Dunn, in March 1956 and they lived in Marylebone. His second wife died of cancer in 1976. Janet Thurston, widow of fellow coroner Gavin Thurston, became his third wife in 1982.

== Teaching ==
He was a talented teacher, through both the spoken and the printed word. The first edition of his book Simpson's Forensic Medicine was published in 1947, and in 1959 was awarded the Swiney Prize of the Royal Society of Arts as the best work on medical jurisprudence of the preceding ten years.

== Social attitudes ==
His views on homosexuality reflected the times in which he had been brought up. In the 1979 edition of his textbook Forensic Medicine he stated (at p 214): " "Homos" and "queer" have become almost playful epithets, and the psychiatrist has done little but excuse or condone such practices. They are rotting the fabric of the arts as well as the more solid principles of family life, and the law properly regards such unnatural sex practices with a stern eye."

To one of his nurses, at a postmortem of a woman who had died as a result of a botched illegal abortion, he had said that "he saw at least two young girls a week who died as a result of septic abortions", and that he was adamant that abortion should be legalised.

== Death ==
He died 21 July 1985, the day after his 78th birthday.

== Image files ==
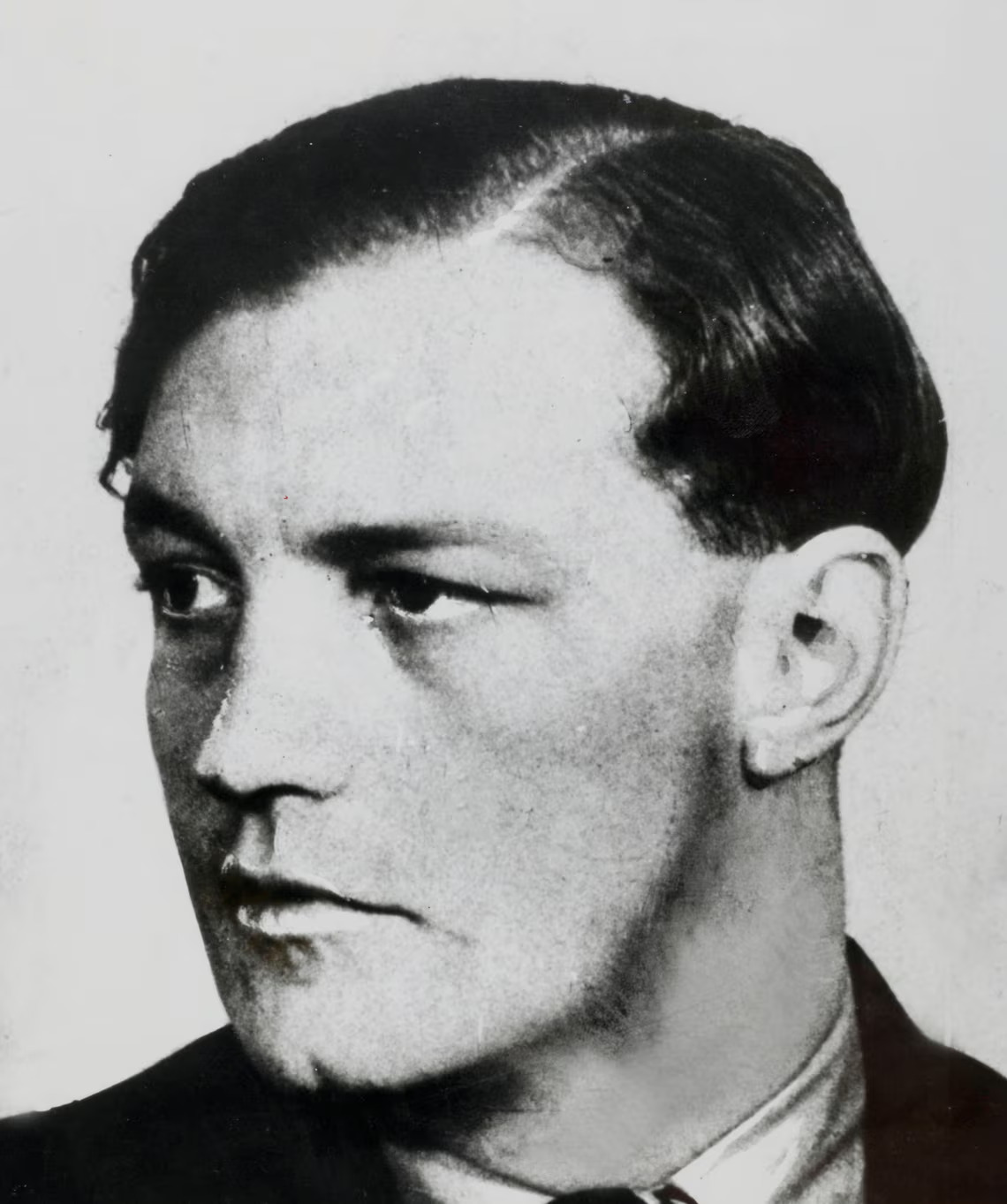
Neville Heath who was convicted of murdering Margery Gardner

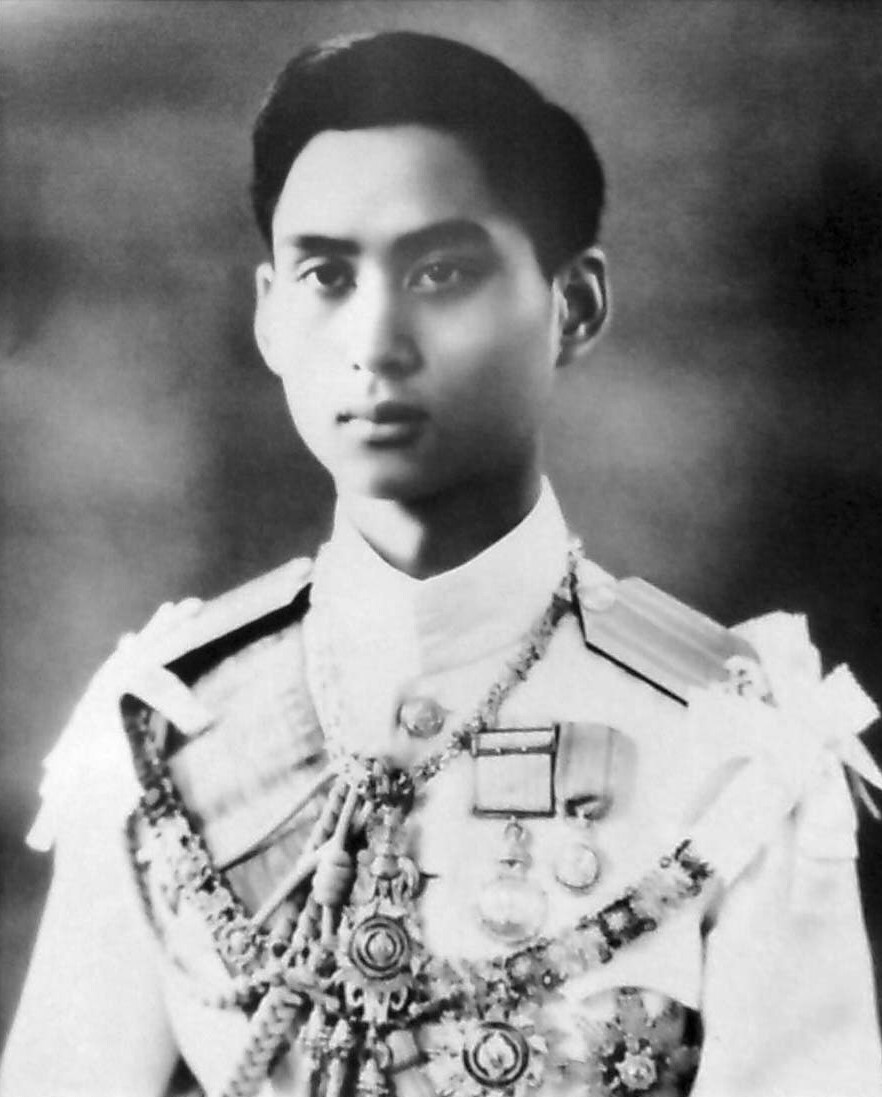
The death of King Ananda was Simpson's first case outside Britain

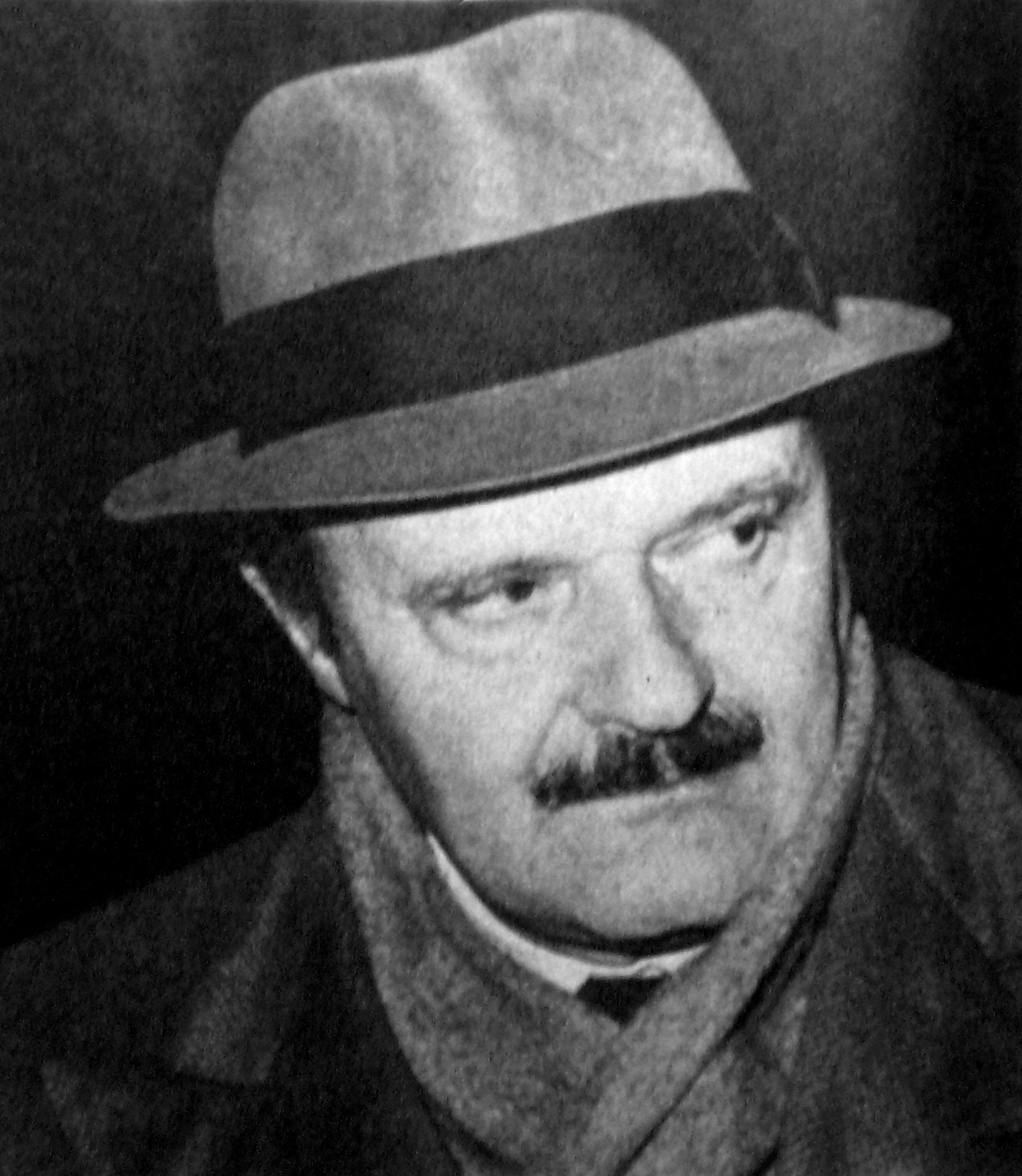
Roberto Calvi "God's Banker" found hanging from Blackfriars Bridge

== Bibliography ==
- Simpson (Professor), Keith (1978), Forty Years of Murder, Grafton Books, London, ISBN 0-586-05038-8
- Shepherd, R. (2003) Simpson’s Forensic Medicine Archived 1 February 2014 at the Wayback Machine, Twelfth Edition, Arnold, 31 July 2003
- C K Simpson CBE, MD, FRCP, FRCPATH, DMJ, Obituary, British Medical Journal, Vol 291, 10 August 1985
- A. Keith Mant, M.D., 'Cedric Keith Simpson An Appreciation' Obituary, The American Journal of Forensic Medicine and Pathology, 7(3) 258–259, 1986, Ravens Press, New York.
- Eckert, William, "The Development of Forensic Medicine in the United Kingdom From the 18th Century", The American Journal of Forensic Medicine and Pathology 13:2 (June 1992) 124-131
- Lane, B. (2004). The encyclopedia of forensic science London: Magpie Books.
- Simpson, K., As Guy Bailey. (1969). The fatal chance: 12 cases from the notebook of a crime pathologist. London: Peter Davies.
- Thorwald, J. (1964). The century of the detective New York: Harcourt, Brace & World.
- Wilson, C., & Wilson, D. (2003). Written in blood: A History of forensic detection. New York: Carroll and Graf Publishers.
- Harry Haynes, MEDICAL CLASSICS: Forty Years of Murder, VIEWS & REVIEWS, BMJ, Published 8 October 2012, BMJ 2012;345:e6737
- Ramsland, Katherine, A sharp eye in the autopsy: profile of Keith Simpson Archived 9 May 2013 at the Wayback Machine The Forensic Examiner, American College of Forensic Examiners, Spring, 2007, Volume: 16 Issue: 1
