= King Apparatus =

Canadian third-wave ska band

- Origin: London/Toronto, Ontario, Canada
- Genres: ska
- Years active: 1987–1994, 2000
- Labels: Raw Energy, Cargo Records, Stomp
- Past members: Chris Murray; Sam Tallo; Paul Ruston; J.C. Orr; Paul McCulloch; Mitch Girio; Mark LeBourdais; Aleks Dmitrovic; Greg Clancy; Bruno Hedman; Brian Christopher; Dave Kennedy; Mike Southern; Craig Lapsley

King Apparatus was a Canadian third wave ska band, active in the early 1990s. Formed in 1987 in London, Ontario, and later based in Toronto, the band's lineup varied over its lifetime, including vocalist Chris Murray, guitarists Sam Tallo, Paul Ruston, J. C. Orr and Paul McCulloch, bassist Mitch Girio, organists Mark LeBourdais and Aleks Dmitrovic, conga player Greg Clancy, saxophonist Bruno Hedman, and drummers Brian Christopher, Dave Kennedy and Mike Southern. Their style was strongly influenced by late 1970s 2-Tone ska, although it introduced a heavier guitar attack than traditional ska.

== Career ==
The band started in London, Ontario, in the mid-1980s, at a time when founding members Murray, Tallo and Girio were students at Fanshawe College or the University of Western Ontario, and later moved to Toronto.

Their debut EP, 1989's Loud Party, was the first-ever release on Raw Energy Records, and was followed by the full-length album King Apparatus in 1990. With distribution in just a handful of downtown Toronto record stores, the self-titled album sold over 5,000 copies, helping Raw Energy to secure a national distribution deal with A&M Records.

The band's best-known single, "Made for TV", was a hit on modern rock radio stations in Canada in 1991, reaching No. 1 on CFNY-FM and on the national campus radio charts, and its video was in heavy rotation on MuchMusic. The video's most unusual feature was that it included a picture-in-picture box of a sign language interpreter signing the lyrics. The album was supported with a national tour.

The band won two CASBY Awards for Best Reggae/Ska Group, in both 1991 and 1992.

Following disappointing sales of their second album Marbles, the band left Raw Energy for Cargo Records, but ultimately broke up before recording another album. The band's stability was also impacted by their heavy touring schedule; by 1994, they had undertaken twelve cross-Canada tours in just five years. Murray immediately joined the Toronto reggae band One, and has continued to pursue a solo career in music. LeBourdais, the grandson of historian D. M. LeBourdais and journalist Isabel LeBourdais, later worked as a high school teacher in Delta, British Columbia. Mitch Girio is still a large part of the Toronto ska scene, including as a solo artist and as lead singer and guitarist for the band The King Kong 4. Sam Tallo played in indie rock band 'The Nines' with Steve Eggars and Paul McCulloch, then moved to Nanaimo, then Victoria, British Columbia. He's remained involved in the local music scene and also helped organize Victoria's first Ska Festival.

The band reissued its albums on Stomp Records in 2000, and performed a number of reunion shows that year. Their show at Toronto's Lee's Palace on March 24, 2000, was webcast by primeticket.net.

== Discography ==
- Loud Party (1989)
- King Apparatus (1990)
- Hospital Waiting Room (1992)
- Marbles (1993)
