= Vanastra, Ontario =

Vanastra
- Dispersed rural community
- Village of Vanastra
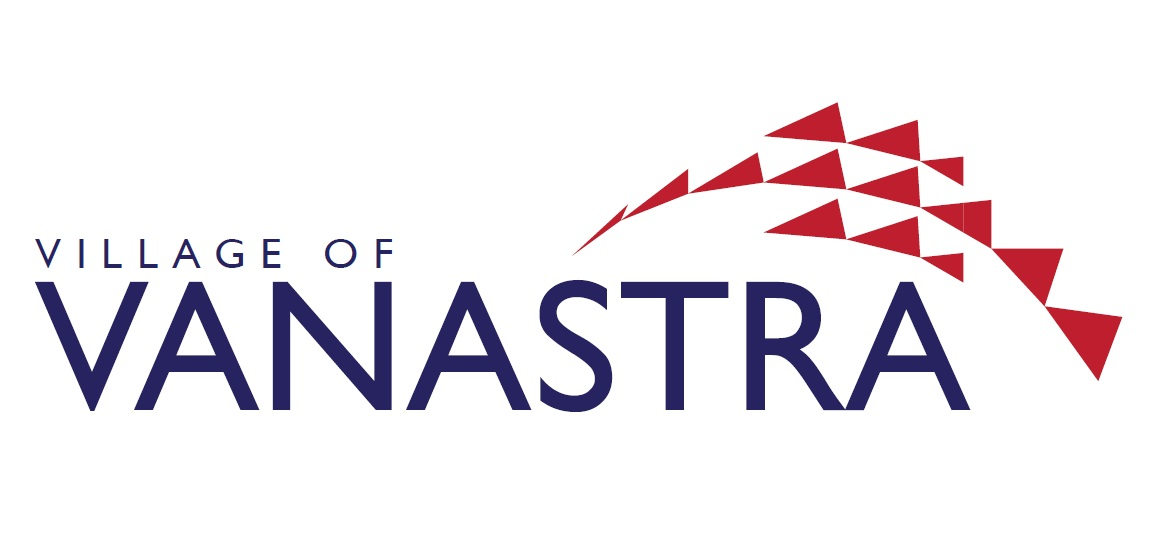
- Coat of arms

- Location in southern Ontario
- Coordinates: 43°35′01″N 81°31′21″W
- Country: Canada
- Province: Ontario
- County: Huron
- Municipality: Huron East
- Base Established: 1941
- Community created: 1971

Government
  - Mayor: Bernie MacLellan
  - Federal riding: Huron—Bruce
  - Prov. riding: Huron—Bruce
- Elevation: 283 m (928 ft)
- Time zone: UTC-5 (Eastern Time Zone)
  - Summer (DST): UTC-4 (Eastern Time Zone)
- Postal Code FSA: N0M
- Area codes: 519, 226, 548
- Website: huroneast.com

Vanastra is a dispersed rural community and unincorporated place in the municipality of Huron East, Huron County in southwestern Ontario, Canada, 3 kilometres (1.9 mi) southeast of the community of Clinton. It is located on the former property of a top secret Royal Canadian Air Force (RCAF) station used to train and supply over 7,000 radar technicians and support staff for American, British and Canadian forces during World War II.

The base was renamed Canadian Forces Base Clinton in 1966 and experienced remarkable growth and development as a peacetime training facility for wireless telegraphy. Expansion of the base included recreational facilities, clubs and local sports teams. Following the closure of the base in 1971 the 250-acre (100 ha) property valued at 40 million dollars, was purchased by a developer for $468,000. It was sold piece by piece to private home owners and businesses over the next several years. The recreation centre, parkland and the curling club were deeded to the Township.

As a result of amalgamation in 2001, Vanastra became one of many communities to make up the Municipality of Huron East. In 2013 the municipality and the residents launched the Vanastra Revival Plan to honour the historical international contribution made by CFB Clinton, and to plan for a community revival.

== Name ==
The name is derived from a combination of the name of local real estate developer John Van Gastel and of the RCAF motto, Latin: Per Ardua Ad Astra, lit. 'through adversity to the stars'. Van Gastel had purchased four decommissioned Canadian Forces bases, including CFB Clinton, CFS Armstrong, CFS Foymount and CFS Ramore. He held a contest to rename the CFB Clinton and find a new name for the town. Mrs. Margaret Rudd, a resident of Clinton, submitted the winning name Vanastra and received a free home.

== History ==
The initial air base was established by the Royal Air Force (RAF) with the purchase of Norman Tyndall’s 100-acre farm located at Lot 46 Concession 1 in Tuckersmith Township (now part of Huron East, Ontario since 2001), in the spring of 1941 under the British Commonwealth Air Training Plan.

The high bluffs overlooking Lake Huron, ten miles away, was thought to be the perfect place to simulate the coastal conditions in Britain. The objective of radar was to intercept German aircraft before they reached the coast of England. British radar training facilities were always under threat of German bombing, so an alternative training site was necessary.

The site went from farmland to start-up of training in only fourteen weeks. Roads and over 40 buildings were built. The school was ready so quickly that the first group of RCAF trainees had not yet completed their University of Toronto course, and so the first students were American Forces personnel. By the end of the war, over 5,000 Canadian airmen and 750 officers, as well as some 2,000 Americans, were trained in radar technology at Clinton. An August 1945 Time magazine article said: “The United States students, most of them university men, thought so highly of the school that it later became the model for U.S training centers … [it is] the most modern electronics training centre on the continent”.

The base was like a village in itself. There were 217 housing units, a fire station, a school, a hospital, a theatre, two churches, and facilities for ice skating, curling, swimming and bowling. When it first opened, the base was known as Royal Air Force (RAF #31 Clinton) Range and Direction Finding (RDF was the British cover name for radar).

In 1943, the Royal Canadian Air Force (RCAF Clinton) took over and the school was renamed #5 Radio School. In June 1944 the BCATP began to scale back and No 5 Radio School was transferred to the RCAF's Home War Operations Training command.

Although threatened with closure following World War II, RCAF Station Clinton was, in fact, saved and authorized as a peacetime RCAF Signals School. In November 1945 it became home to the No. 1 Radar and Communications School (No. 1 R&CS), which it co-hosted with nearby RCAF Station Centralia. With military forces’ integration in 1966, the base experienced remarkable growth and development over the next 24 years including married quarters and barracks supporting recreational facilities, clubs and sports teams.

During the Cold War, RCAF Station Clinton hosted other units, including No. 12 Examination Unit, No. 1 Air Radio Officer School, School of Food Services (1945–67), and the Aerospace Engineering (AERE) Officer School, the School of Instructional Technique (1962–71), and the Guided Missile School (1958-early 1960s).

After the 1 February 1968 merger of the RCAF with the Royal Canadian Navy and Canadian Army to form the Canadian Forces, RCAF Station Clinton's name was changed to Canadian Forces Base Clinton or CFB Clinton. With the merger, the Canadian Forces were rationalized and many of its facilities consolidated to avoid duplication. CFB Clinton was closed by 1971, and its remaining units distributed to other facilities.

Following the closure of the base, the buildings were sold to real estate developer John Van Gastel and now make up the small village.

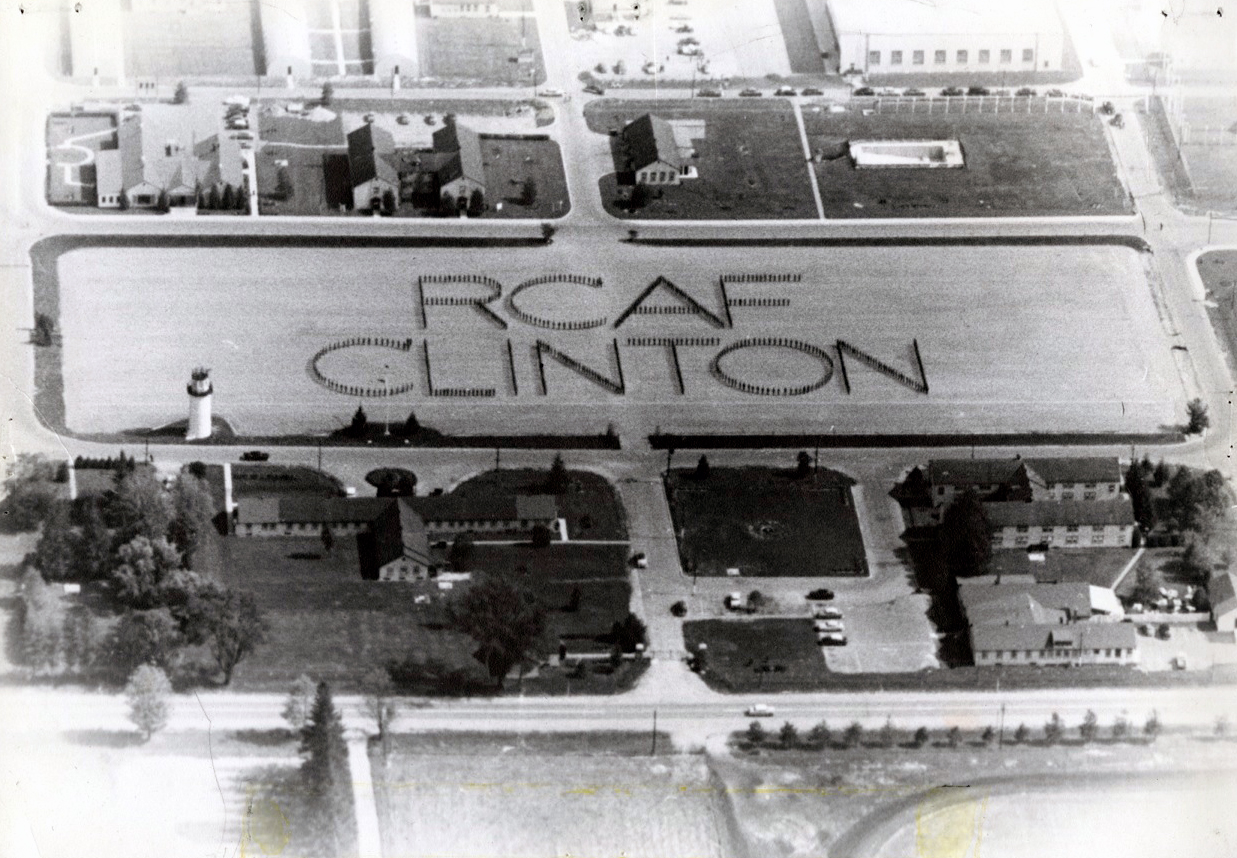
Aerial Photo

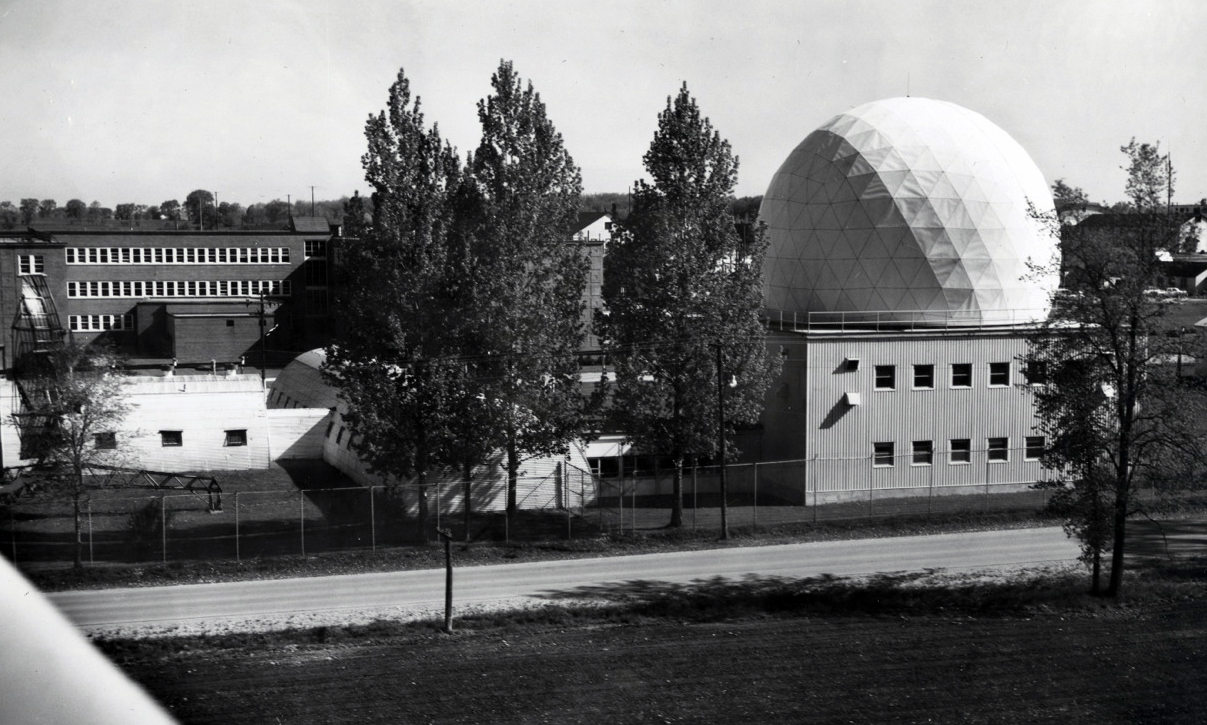
Radar Dome

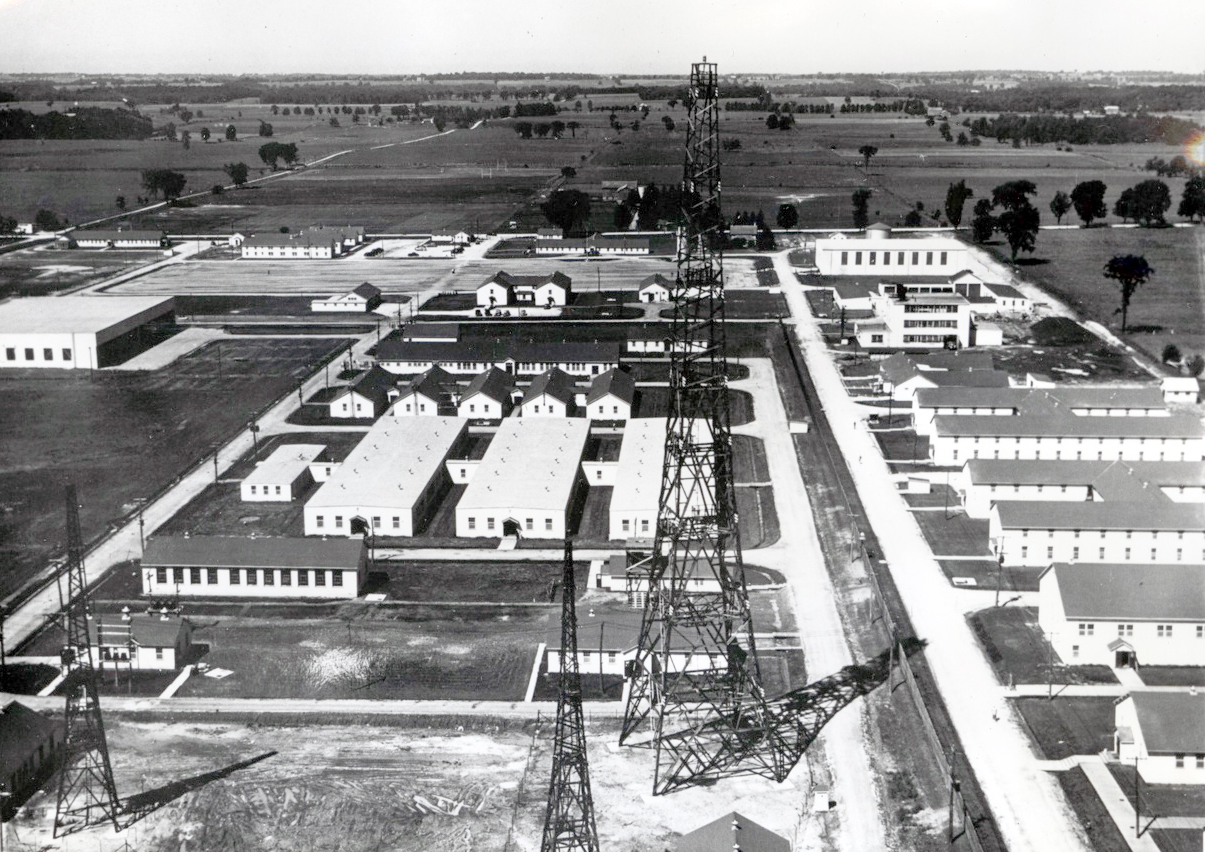
Signal Towers

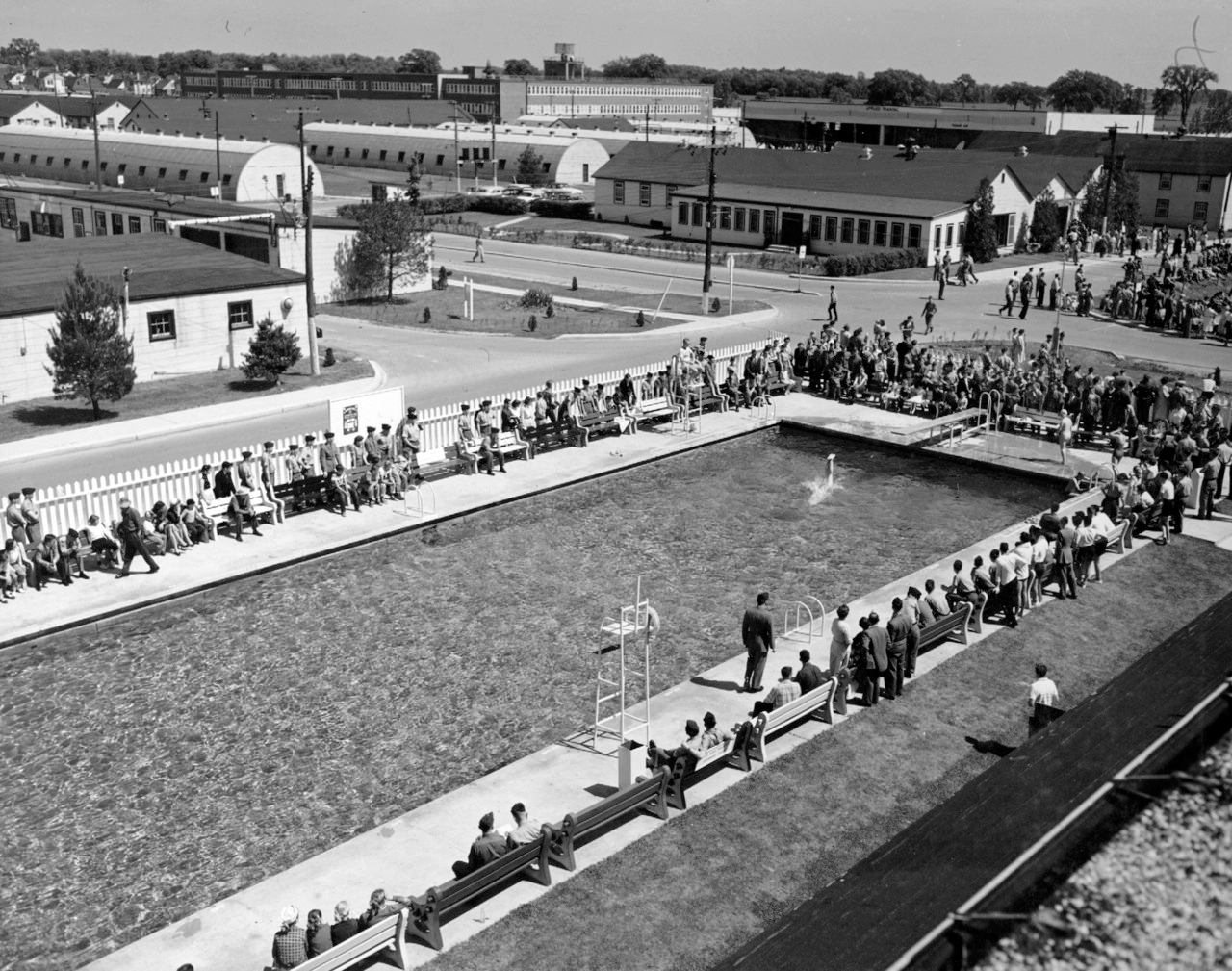
Swimming Pool

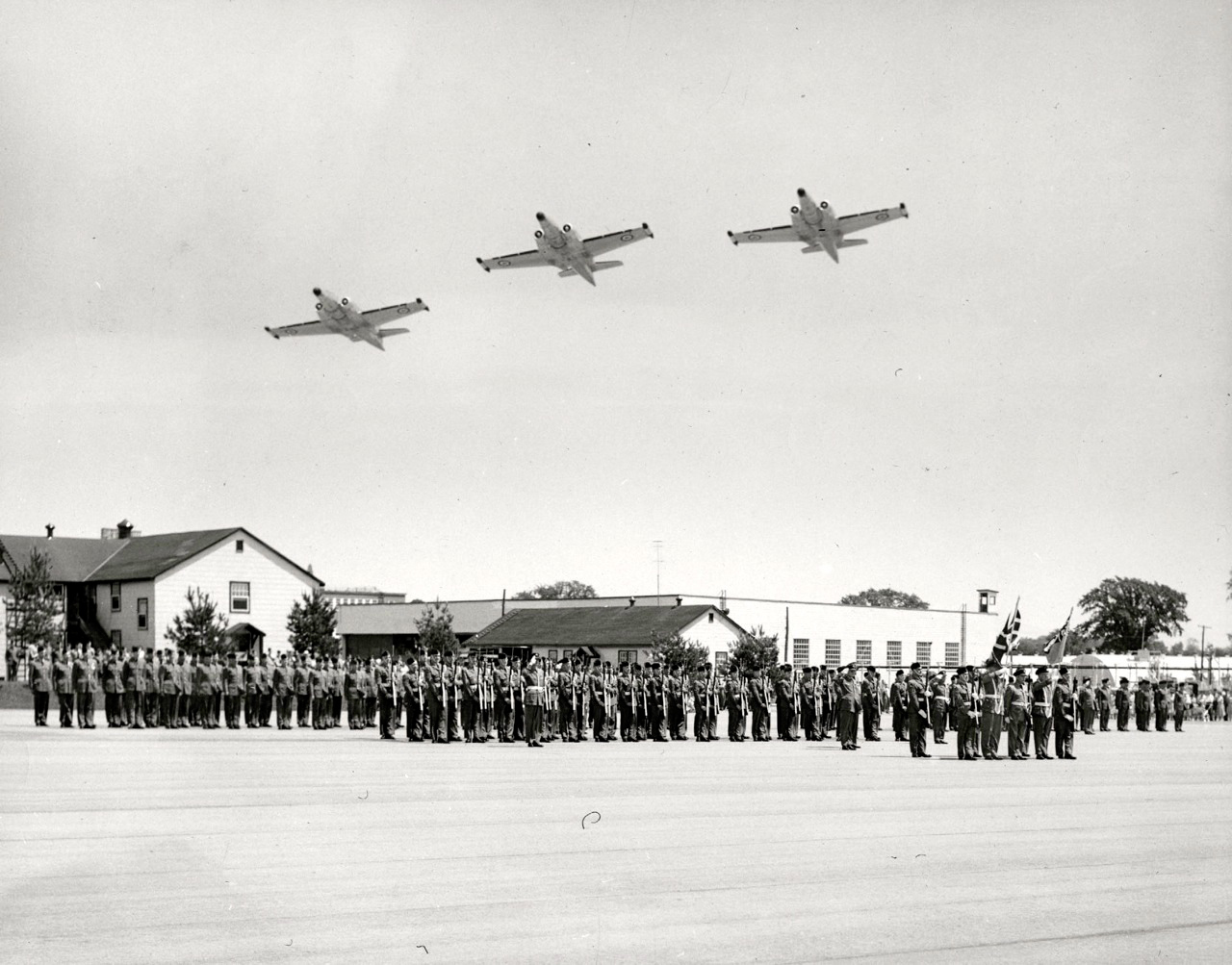
Jet Flyby

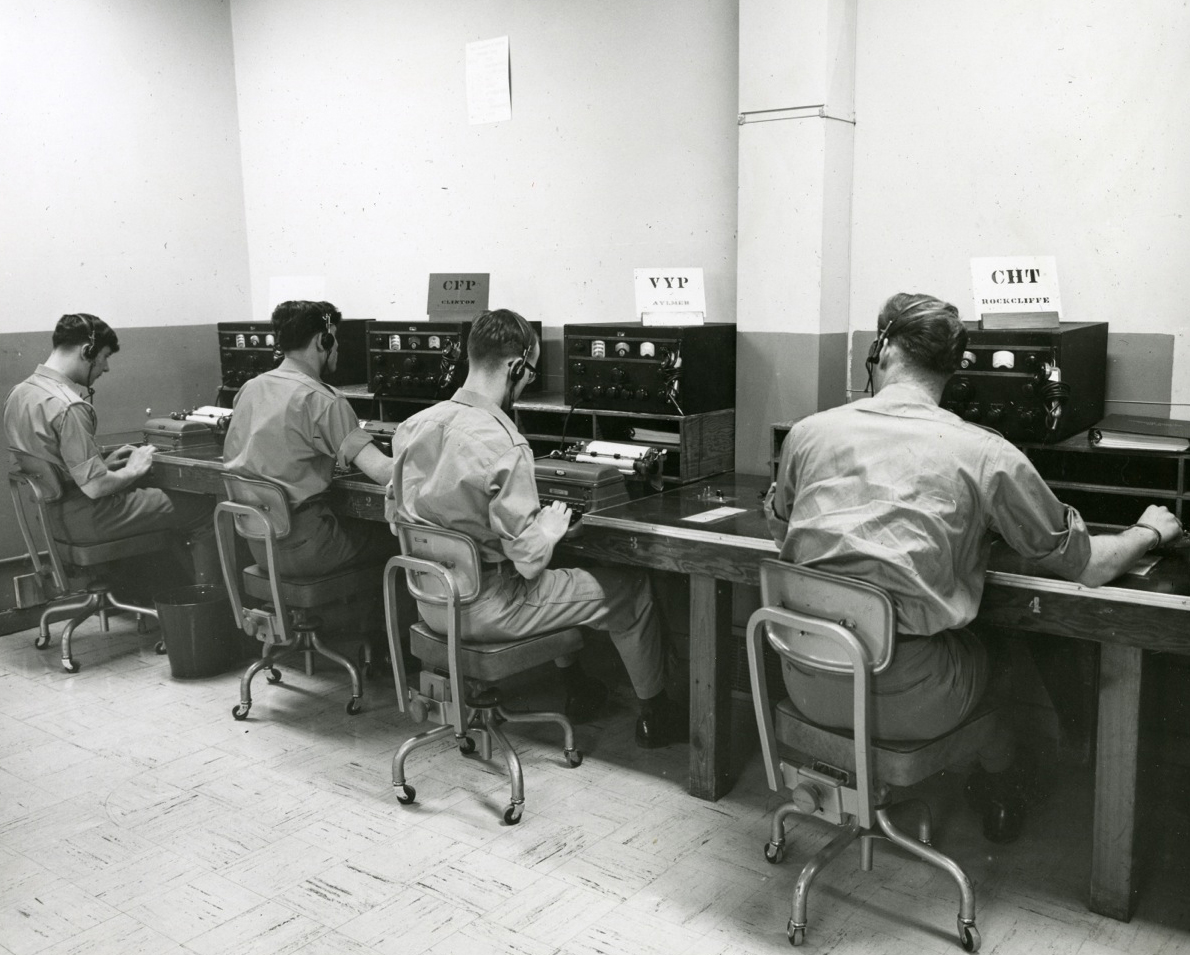
Tech Training

== Transportation ==
Ontario Highway 4 or London Road is the main road that runs through Vanastra between Clinton and Exeter.

There are no airports located within Vanastra; the closest major airport is located in London, Ontario.

There is no local or regional bus servicing Vanastra. A pre-registered door to door transportation services operates within Huron County and Perth County.

== Notoriety ==
In 1959 a local resident, Steven Truscott (aged 14 years at the time) was falsely convicted for the murder of Lynne Harper and sentenced to be executed. After a 48-year struggle to clear his name, Truscott was acquitted by the Ontario Court of Appeal on August 28, 2007.
