= CFB Clinton =

Former Canadian Forces Base in Ontario

Coordinates: 43.583°N 81.523°W

Canadian Forces Base Clinton, CFB Clinton for short, was a Canadian Forces Base located near Clinton, Ontario. It initially opened in July 1941 as RAF Station Clinton under the British Commonwealth Air Training Plan as a training unit for radar operators during a period when radar was a top secret device. UK, Canadian, US and other servicemen were trained at Clinton, with practical flights being carried out at nearby RCAF Station Centralia. Clinton remained the primary radar training site for Canadian Forces personnel through the Cold War era, with continued expansions throughout the 1950s and 60s. As part of a centralization effort, CFB Clinton was closed in 1971, with the site abandoned by 1972. A number of buildings remain on the site, including a large "golf ball" radome.

== History ==
=== RAF radar training school ===
The station was established in July 1941 by the Royal Air Force (RAF) as RAF Station Clinton under the British Commonwealth Air Training Plan.

=== Radar training school ===
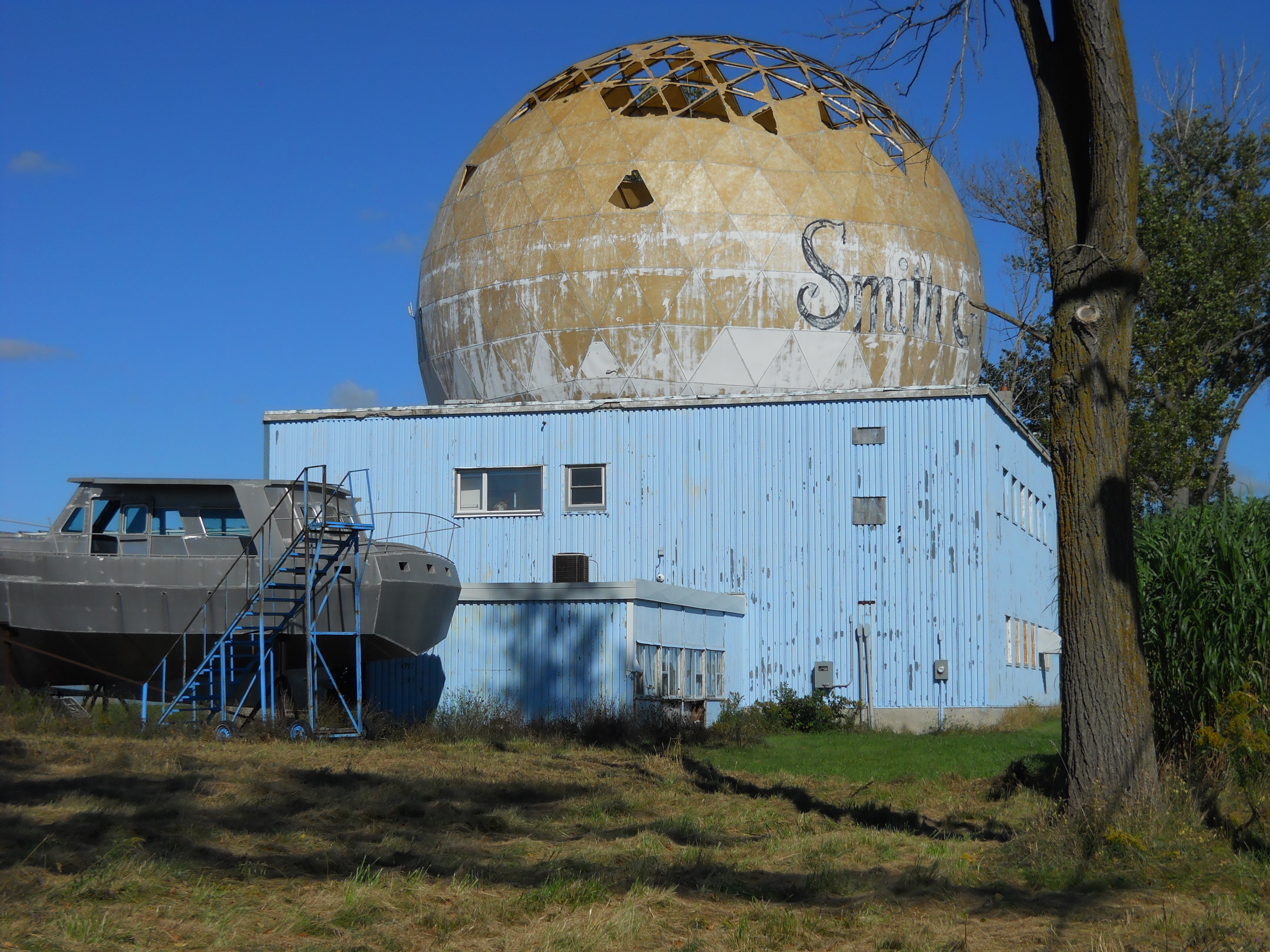
The abandoned radar building on Vanastra Road

From its start, the station hosted the No. 31 Range and Direction Finding (RDF) School (RDF was the British cover name for radar). In July 1943, No. 31 RDF was decommissioned and No. 5 Radio School was created in its place by the Royal Canadian Air Force (RCAF), with the station becoming RCAF Station Clinton. In June 1944 the BCATP began to scale back and No. 5 Radio School was transferred to the RCAF's Home War Operations Training command.

Unlike many RCAF stations across Canada, RCAF Station Clinton was not mothballed at the end of the Second World War and in November 1945 became home to the No. 1 Radar and Communications School (No. 1 R&CS), which it co-hosted with nearby RCAF Station Centralia.

During the Cold War, RCAF Station Clinton hosted other units, including No. 12 Examination Unit, No. 1 Air Radio Officer School, School of Food Services, and the Aerospace Engineering (AERE) Officer School.

The February 1, 1968, merger of the RCAF with the Royal Canadian Navy and Canadian Army to form the Canadian Forces saw RCAF Station Clinton change its name to Canadian Forces Base Clinton or CFB Clinton.

The merger saw the Canadian Forces rationalize and consolidate many of its facilities to avoid duplication and CFB Clinton was closed by 1971 with its remaining units distributed to other facilities.

Following the closure of the base, the buildings were sold to real estate developer John Van Gastel and now make up the small village of Vanastra, Ontario.

Some of the original radar equipment has been relocated to the Secrets of Radar Museum in London, Ontario. The museum is located at this time at the 427 Wing, 2155B Crumlin Road North, London. The importance of the work done at RAF Clinton was that not only the radar was created and improved upon, but the common microwave stems directly from that research.

=== Murder of Lynne Harper ===
On June 9, 1959, 12-year-old Lynne Harper, who lived in the married quarters on the base disappeared after accepting a ride on the bicycle of 14-year-old classmate Steven Truscott. After a search which included hundreds of members of the RCAF from the station, her body was discovered a short distance from the station. Truscott was arrested, denied many of the civilized considerations not yet enshrined in law as 'rights' (such as full disclosure of the evidence against him) and convicted of Capital Murder. He was not convicted of rape, yet this was always presented as a motive. His sentence was to be death by hanging, but this was commuted to life in prison.

This death sentence is often credited for bringing an end to the death penalty in Canada. In addition, Truscott never exhibited any pathological behaviors that would be used by criminal profilers to include him in a pool of suspects. He was eventually exonerated when his conviction was overturned after 45 years.
