= London International Airport =

Airport in Ontario, Canada

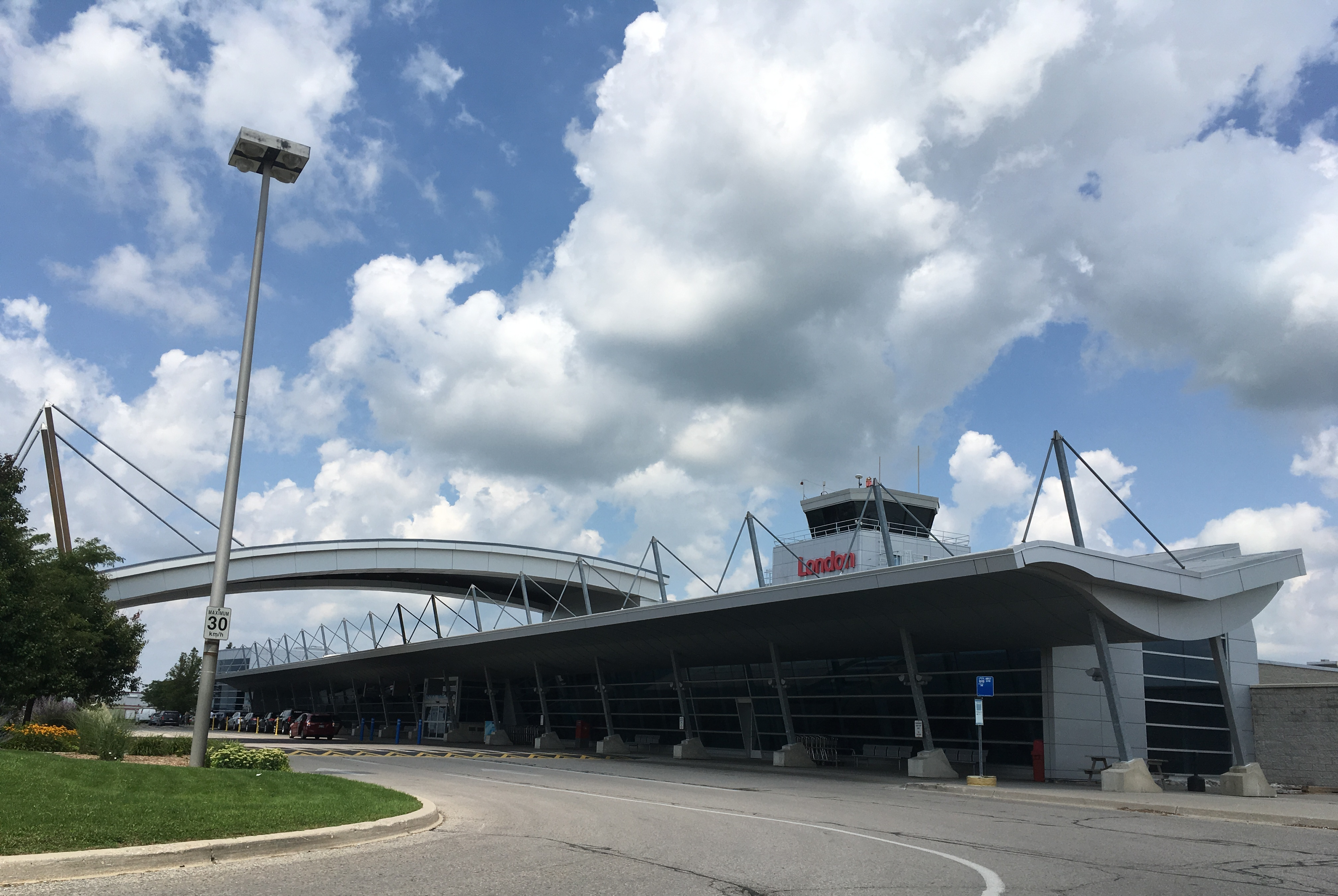
- London International Airport
- IATA: YXU; ICAO: CYXU; WMO: 71623

Summary
- Airport type: Public
- Owner: Transport Canada
- Operator: Greater London International Airport Authority
- Serves: London, Ontario
- Location: London, Ontario
- Opened: 1940
- Focus city for: Porter Airlines
- Time zone: EST (UTC−05:00)
  - Summer (DST): EDT (UTC−04:00)
- Elevation AMSL: 912 ft (278 m)
- Coordinates: 43°01′59″N 81°09′04″W
- Website: https://www.flyyxu.ca

Map
- Location in Ontario CYXU (Canada)

Runways
Direction	Length		Surface
Direction	m	ft	Surface
15/33	2,682	8,800	Asphalt
09/27	1,920	6,300	Asphalt

Statistics (2025)
- Aircraft movements: 112,009
- Total passengers: 297,822
- Sources: Canada Flight Supplement; Environment Canada; Movements from Statistics Canada; Passenger statistics from London International

London International Airport (IATA: YXU, ICAO: CYXU) is an airport in London, Ontario, Canada. It is 5 nautical miles (9.3 km; 5.8 mi) northeast of the city of London, Ontario and is classified as an airport of entry by Transport Canada. In 2023, the airport was listed as the 17th busiest airport in Canada in terms of aircraft movements with 102,122 flights. The airport posted a record 683,000 travelers in 2019 and 332,447 passengers in 2023. It has air service year-round by Air Canada Express and WestJet, and seasonally by Air Transat.

The airport is classified as a port of entry for both cargo and passengers. It is staffed by the Canada Border Services Agency (CBSA) and officers at this airport can handle aircraft with no more than 180 passengers.

== History ==
=== London Airport, 1929–1942 ===
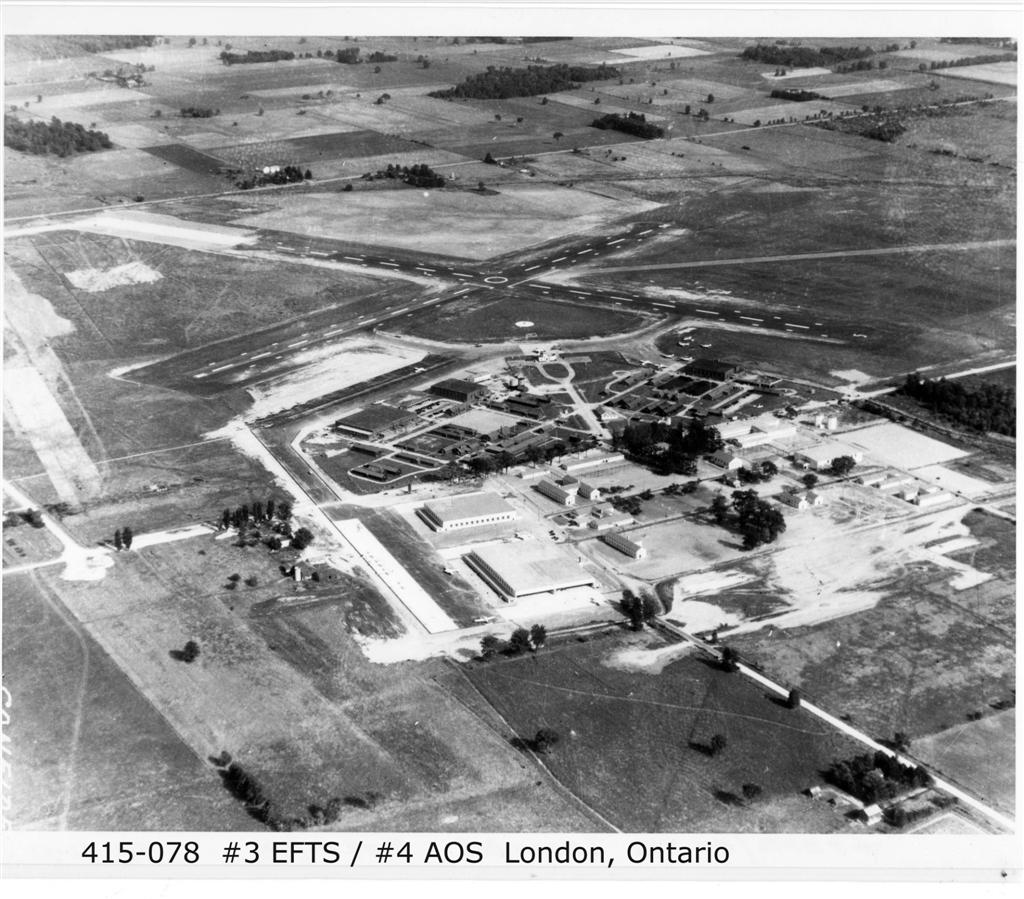
Crumlin Airfield c. 1942

In January 1927 the City of London selected a site for an airfield at Lambeth, Ontario near 42°55′00″N 081°17′00″W; the adjacent road to the east between Southdale and Exeter was known as Airport Road up through 1989. (The town of Westminster was established in 1989, all rural roads were named by the town, and Airport Road was renamed Wonderland Road, with which it was aligned since 1971.) A group of local businessmen acquired the site in 1928 and by 3 May 1929 an airport license was issued to London Airport Ltd. The London Flying Club was formed in 1928 and became a tenant of the new airport. (Note: In 1927 the Government of Canada started a program to stimulate the growth of civil aviation through the creation of flying clubs. Groups that could provide a suitable airfield with facilities and at least 30 members were supplied with two aircraft and awarded $100 for each member who qualified as a pilot. The London Flying Club was established under this program.) The airfield was used for flying instruction, private aviation, and air mail. By 1933 it was too small for some commercial aircraft.

The London Flying Club continued to use the Lambeth airfield until 7 August 1942.

=== London City Airport, 1940–1945 ===
In 1935 the city decided to replace the original London Airport. Site surveys and consultations took place; and on 9 September 1939, at the start of World War II, work began on a new airport located near Crumlin. The city leased the new airport to the Government of Canada, Department of Transport on 24 January 1940 for the duration of the war.

Runways 14-32 and 05-23 were paved and ready for use by July 1940 and the Royal Canadian Air Force established RCAF Station Crumlin on part of the airport. This air station was host to No. 3 Elementary Flying Training School (EFTS) and No. 4 Air Observer School (AOS), both part of the British Commonwealth Air Training Plan.

The airport remained under civilian management and was used for civil and military aviation during the war years. The licence for London City Airport was issued on 6 May 1941. Improvements made during this time include:

- main terminal building (civilian) opened in July 1942
- Trans-Canada Airlines began serve to the airport in July 1942.
- runway 08-26 added in 1943.

British Commonwealth Air Training Plan operations ended on 31 December 1944 with the closure of No. 4 Air Observer School.

The RAF Transport Command, No. 45 Group established the Mosquito Preparation and Despatching Unit at London on 10 January 1945. This detachment had 23 members and test flew De Havilland Mosquitos built in Toronto before they were flown overseas.

After the war the airport remained under the control of the Department of Transport. (Note: Many municipalities in Canada declined to accept responsibility for their airports after the war and so the Government of Canada, Department of Transport became the operator of most of the larger airports in the country.)

==== Aerodrome information ====
In about 1942 the aerodrome was listed at 43°02′N 81°09′W with a Var. 5 degrees W and elevation of 899 feet (274 m). Two runways were listed as follows:

Runway name	Total length	Total width	Paved length	Paved width
5/23	3,400 feet (1,036 m)	500 feet (152 m)	3,150 feet (960 m)	150 feet (46 m)
4/22	3,400 feet (1,036 m)	500 feet (152 m)	3,150 feet (960 m)	150 feet (46 m)

=== Postwar RCAF operations 1945–1961 ===
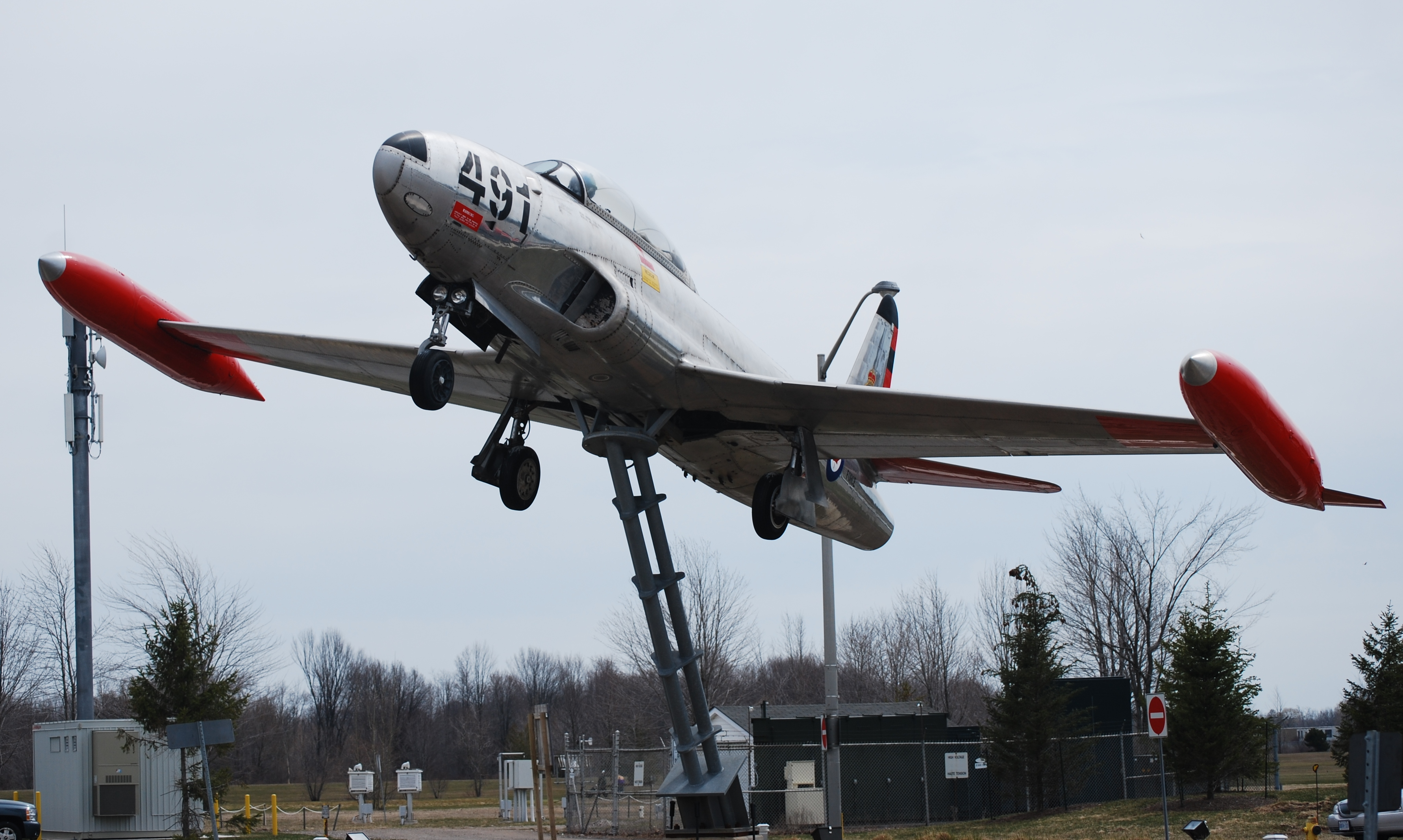
The Canadair CT-133 aircraft mounted in front of the main terminal building

After World War II RCAF reserve or auxiliary squadrons were given the task of defending Canada's major cities. 420 Squadron reformed as City of London 420 (Fighter) Auxiliary Squadron at the airport in September 1948. Initially equipped with Harvard aircraft, the squadron upgraded to Mustangs in 1952 and Canadair CT-133 jets in 1954. The squadron disbanded in 1957. Air Defence Command reformed 2420 Aircraft Control and Warning (Auxiliary) Squadron at London on 1 July 1956. 2420 trained Fighter Control operators and disbanded on 31 May 1961.

RCAF Station London opened in 1950 to support a NATO Induction and Training Centre, later moved to Centralia. The station closed on 30 September 1958.

As a tribute to this period, a Canadair CT-133 aircraft in former Royal Canadian Air Force livery is mounted in front of the main terminal building.

=== Capital improvements since 1950 ===
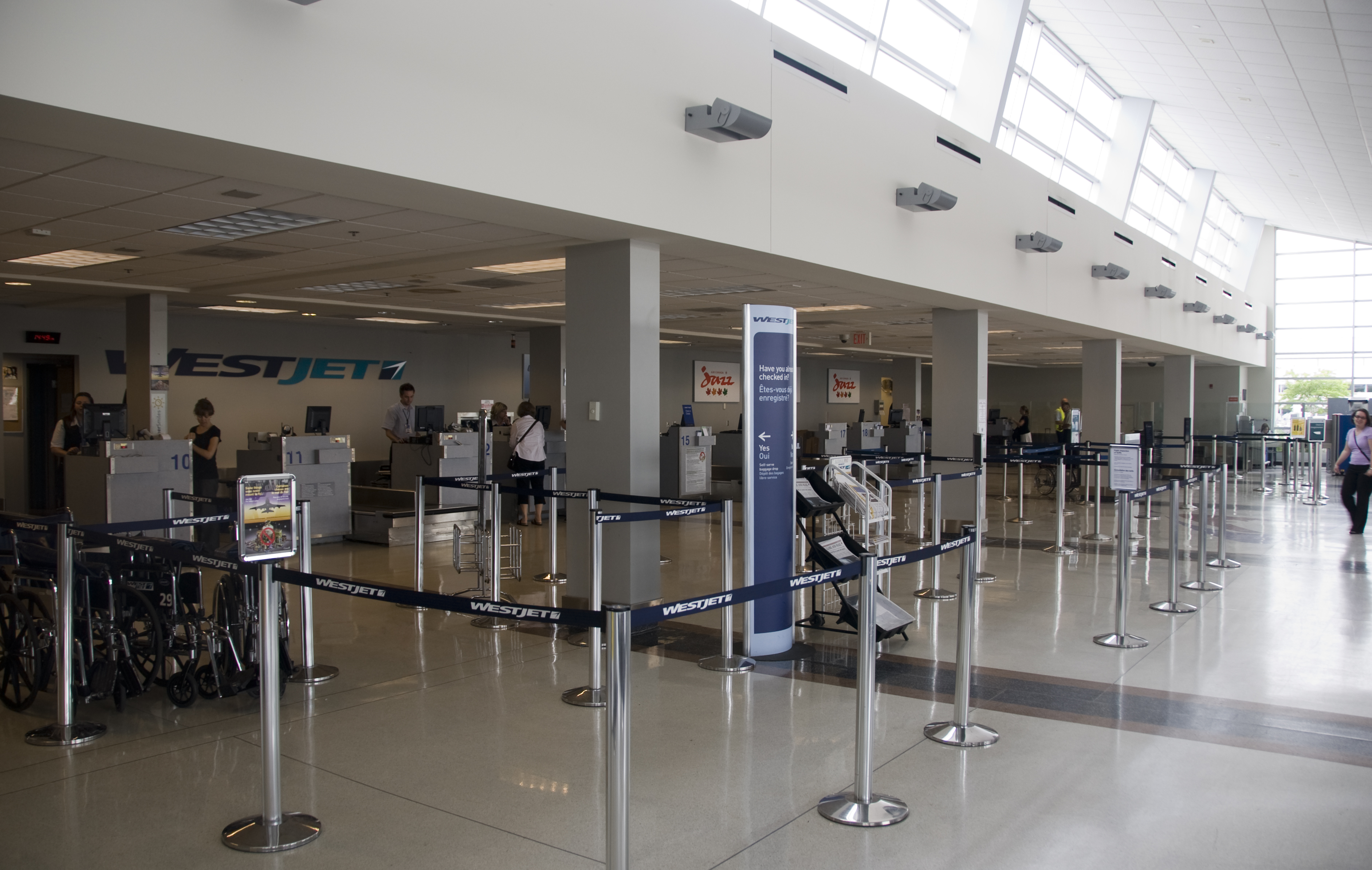
Interior of London International Airport

The airport has been continuously improved since World War II as navigation and air traffic control systems evolved, and as commercial aircraft became larger and larger. These improvements include:

- 1950, installation of the Instrument Landing System (ILS) on runway 14-32
- 1955, runway 14-32 lengthened to 6,000 feet to accommodate the Vickers Viscount
- 1960, Meteorological Branch weather station opened
- 1965, new terminal building opened
- 1968, Air Canada begins DC-9 jet service
- 1974, runway 14-32 lengthened to 8,800 feet to accommodate DC-8, Boeing 707 and 747, and L-1011 aircraft
- 1988, runway 05-23 decommissioned
- 1990, new radar system installed
- 1998, control of the airport was transferred from Transport Canada to the Greater London International Airport Authority
- 2003, main terminal building completely renovated and expanded
- 2019, taxiway G is completely rebuilt

== Airlines and destinations ==
=== Passenger ===
Airlines	Destinations
Air Canada Express	Toronto–Pearson
Air Transat	Seasonal: Cancún, Puerto Plata (begins December 15, 2026), Punta Cana
Porter Airlines	Edmonton (begins May 6, 2027), Halifax (begins April 12, 2027), Montréal–MET (begins April 12, 2027), Ottawa (begins April 12, 2027), Vancouver (begins April 12, 2027); Seasonal: Cancún (begins December 17, 2026), Fort Lauderdale, Montego Bay (begins December 18, 2026), Orlando
WestJet	Calgary; Seasonal: Cancún, Montego Bay, Punta Cana, Winnipeg

== Other tenants ==
- CHC Helicopter - Ornge (Ontario Air Ambulance)
- Jet Aircraft Museum - currently operates three Canadair CT-133 Silver Stars, otherwise known as the T-bird
- Executive Aviation - World Fuel Services-affiliated fixed-base operator
- Trek Aviation - aircraft maintenance and consulting services
- Flite Line Services London - Shell-affiliated fixed-base operator
- Diamond Aircraft - light aircraft manufacturer
- Discovery Air - niche flight services
- Diamond Flight Centre - flight training school
- AFS Aerial Photography - aerial photography services
- 427 (London) Wing - Air Force Association of Canada
- International Test Pilots School
- London Air Cargo

London International Airport Fire Crash and Rescue Station provides fire and rescue operations at the airport with three crash tenders based on Blair Boulevard.

== Ground transportation ==
Shuttle service is available for passengers wishing to connect to flights at Toronto Pearson International Airport in Toronto.

London Transit Commission provides bus service between the airport and Fanshawe College.

== Airshow London ==
The airport is home to the annual Airshow London, the largest military airshow in Canada. It showcases ground and air display of military aircraft from the air forces of Canada, the United States, and the United Kingdom.

== See also ==
- List of airports in the London, Ontario area
