= D. M. LeBourdais =

Canadian non-fiction writer and political activist

D.M. LeBourdais
- Born: 1887; Clinton, British Columbia, Canada
- Died: November 8, 1964 (aged 77); Toronto, Ontario, Canada
- Occupation: Writer
- Spouse: Isabel Erichsen-Brown (m. 1942–1964)
- Writing career
- Period: 20th century
- Genres: History, non-fiction
- Subject: Economics

Donat Marc LeBourdais (1887 – November 8, 1964) was a Canadian non-fiction writer and political activist. He wrote eight books during his lifetime, including six on Canada's economic history, a financial investment guide and a biography of explorer Vilhjalmur Stefansson.

Born in Clinton, British Columbia and raised in Barkerville, he worked for the Yukon Telegraph Service before moving to Ottawa in 1919. He founded the shortlived journal Canadian Nation, before joining a press syndicate to report on Stefansson's expedition to Wrangel Island. He moved to Toronto in 1926, and began to write for periodicals including the Canadian Geographical Journal, Maclean's, Empire Review, Saturday Night and The Beaver. During World War II, he was also employed as an administrator with the Wartime Prices and Trade Board.

As an activist he was the founding executive secretary of the National Railway League, an organization formed to defend public ownership of the Canadian National Railway, and served on the boards of the National Committee on Mental Hygiene and the Mental Patients Welfare Association. He ran for election to the House of Commons of Canada in the 1935 federal election as a Co-operative Commonwealth Federation candidate in the electoral district of High Park, but lost to Alexander James Anderson.

He married journalist Isabel LeBourdais in 1942. Isabel was noted for her 1966 book The Trial of Steven Truscott. They raised four children. Their grandchildren include Mark LeBourdais, a musician who was associated with the band King Apparatus in the 1990s.

== Works ==
- Northward on the New Frontier (1931)
- Canada's Century (1951)
- Why Be a Sucker? Invest in Canada (1952)
- Nation of the North: Canada Since Confederation (1953)
- Sudbury Basin: The Story of Nickel (1953)
- Metals and Men: The Story of Canadian Mining (1957)
- Canada and the Atomic Revolution (1959)
- Stefansson: Ambassador of the North (1963)
