= Recommendation for Mercy =

- Directed by: Murray Markowitz
- Screenplay by: Fabian Jennings, Murray Markowitz, Joe Wiesenfeld
- Starring: Andrew Skidd; Robb Judd; Mike Upmalis
- Production company: Paradise Pictures
- Release date: 1975
- Running time: 92 minutes
- Country: Canada
- Language: English
- Budget: C$250,000
- Box office: $640,000 (Canada)

Recommendation for Mercy (released in the United States as Teenage Psycho Killer) is a 1975 Canadian film fictionalizing the murder trial of Steven Truscott.

Directed by Murray Markowitz, it starred Andrew Skidd, Robb Judd, and Mike Upmalis.
