= RCAF Detachment Grand Bend =

Former Canadian military airfield

RCAF Grand Bend
- Near Grand Bend, Ontario in Canada
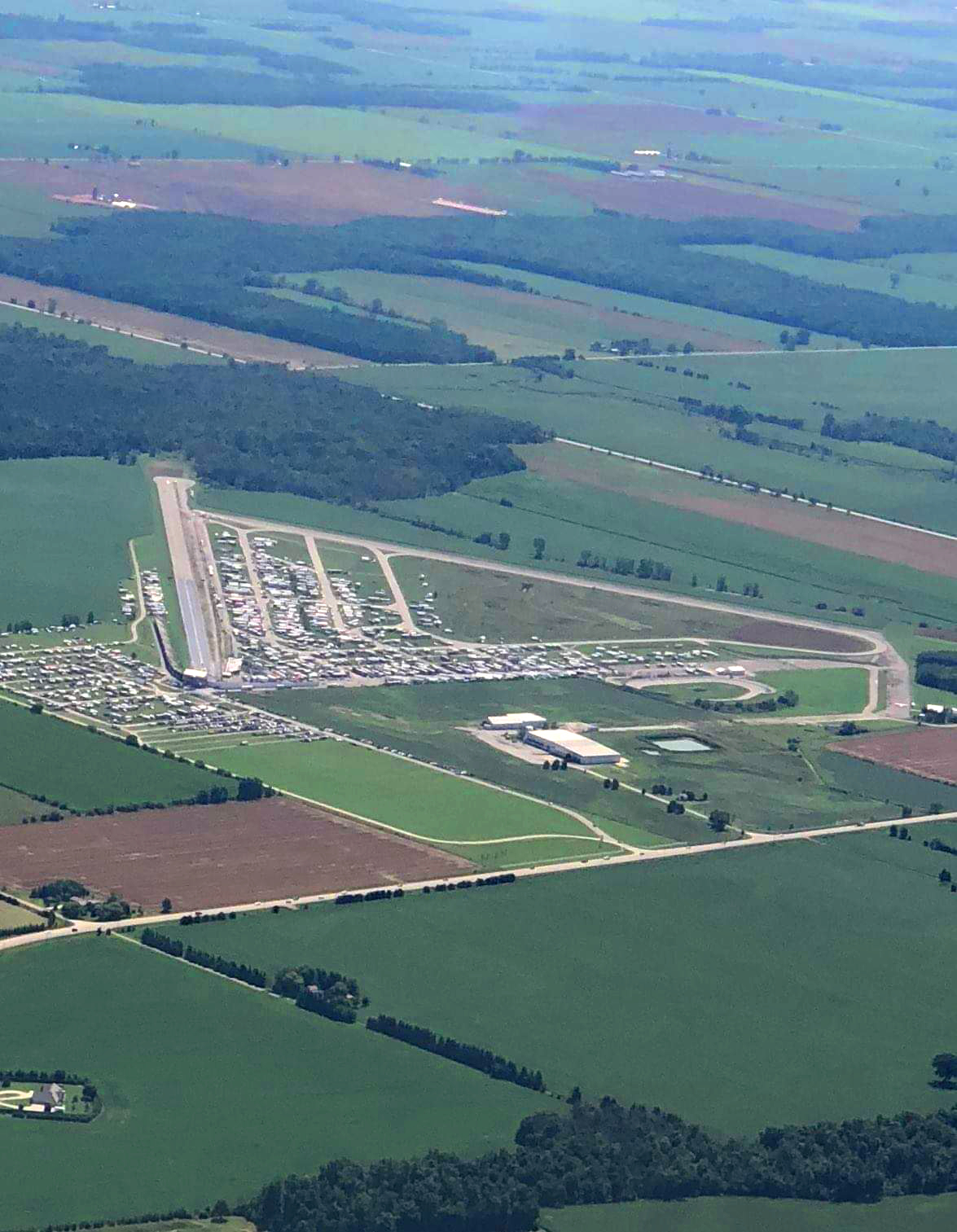
- The airfield site in 2018

Site information
- Operator: Formerly Royal Canadian Air Force
- Controlled by: No. 1 Training Command

Location
- Location within Ontario

Site history
- Fate: Sold, automotive racetrack and private airport

Garrison information
- Garrison: R1, No. 9 Service Flying Training School (1942)

Airfield information
- Identifiers: IATA: none, ICAO: none, LID: CPL4
- Elevation: 650 ft (200 m) AMSL
Runways
Direction	Length and surface
01/19	2,600 ft (790 m) Hard Surface
07/25	2,600 ft (790 m) Hard Surface
13/31	3,100 ft (940 m) Hard Surface

RCAF Detachment Grand Bend, located near Grand Bend, Ontario, was built in 1942 as part of the British Commonwealth Air Training Plan. It was the primary relief aerodrome ("R1") for student pilots training with No. 9 Service Flying Training School at RCAF Station Centralia. Grand Bend was home to No. 1 Flying Control School from 1951 to 1957. The station was used by Centralia until 1961 when it began use with Canadian Army. It was given back to the RCAF in 1962 and was used by RCAF Station Centralia until the aerodrome closed in 1963. Subsequent owners of the property were Eagleson Construction, John Twynsta Holdings Ltd, POG Ltd (Pickling Onion Growers)and the Grand Bend Motorplex.

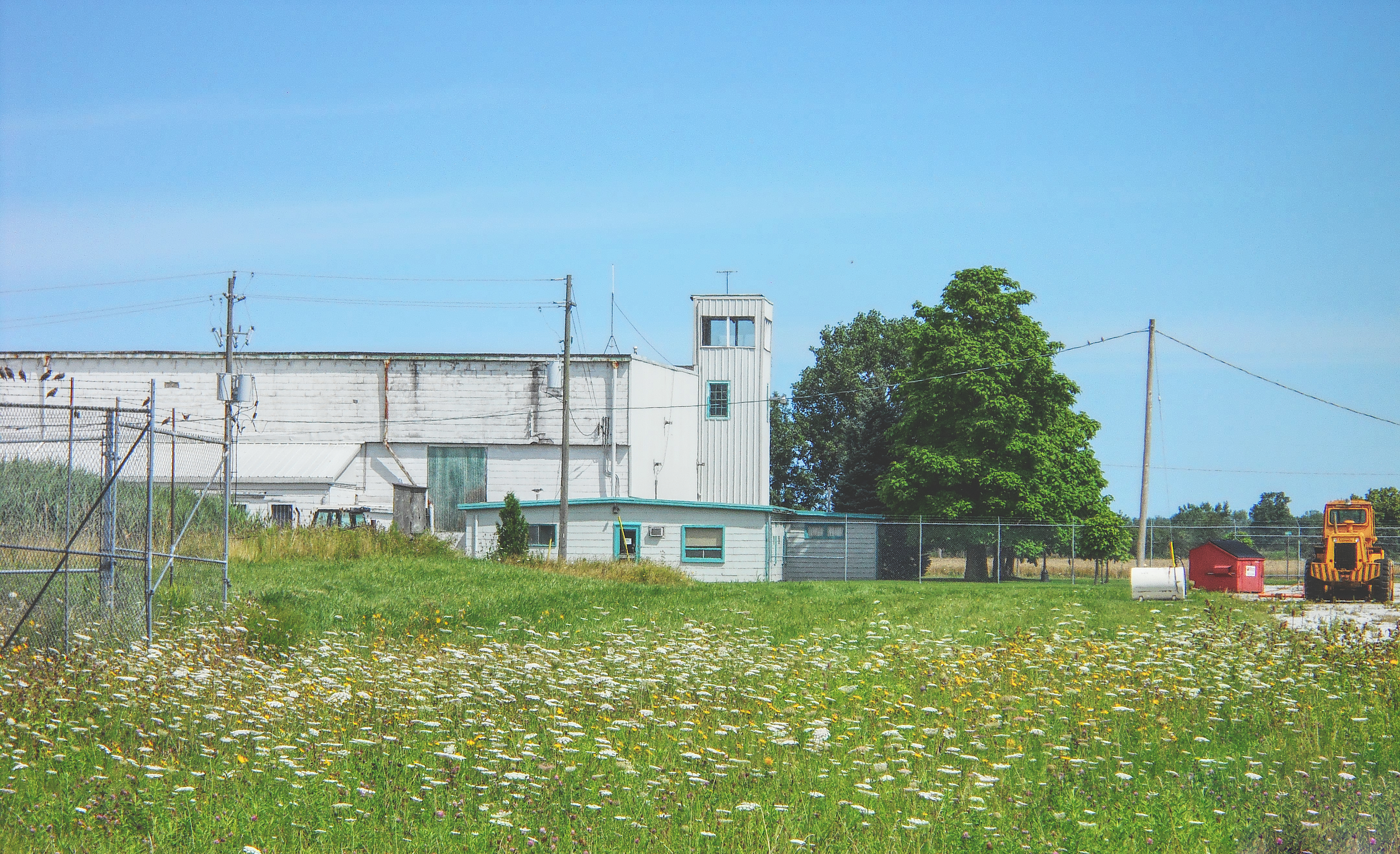
The RCAF hangar seen from the taxiway, control tower on top

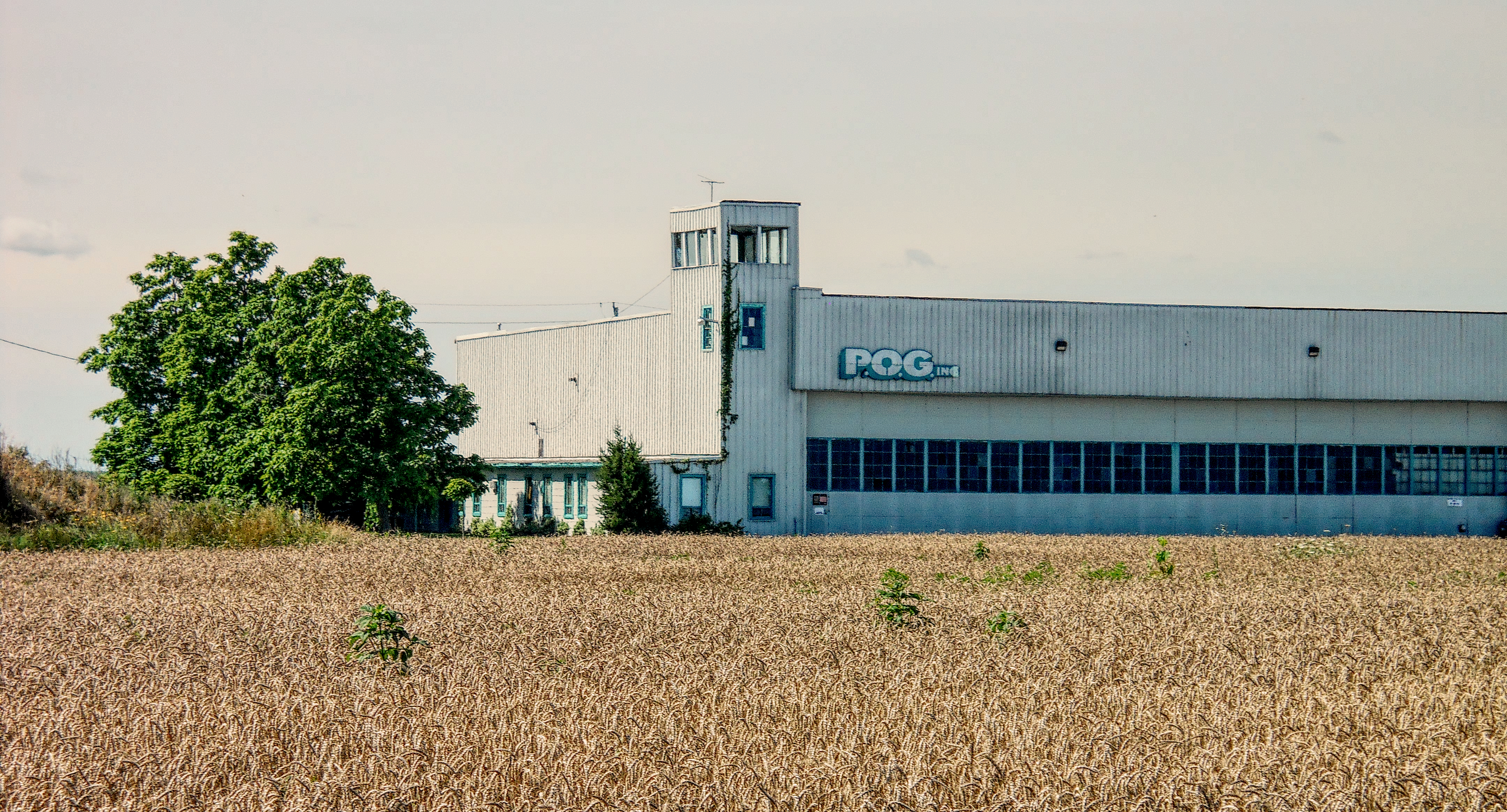
The RCAF hangar seen from the north

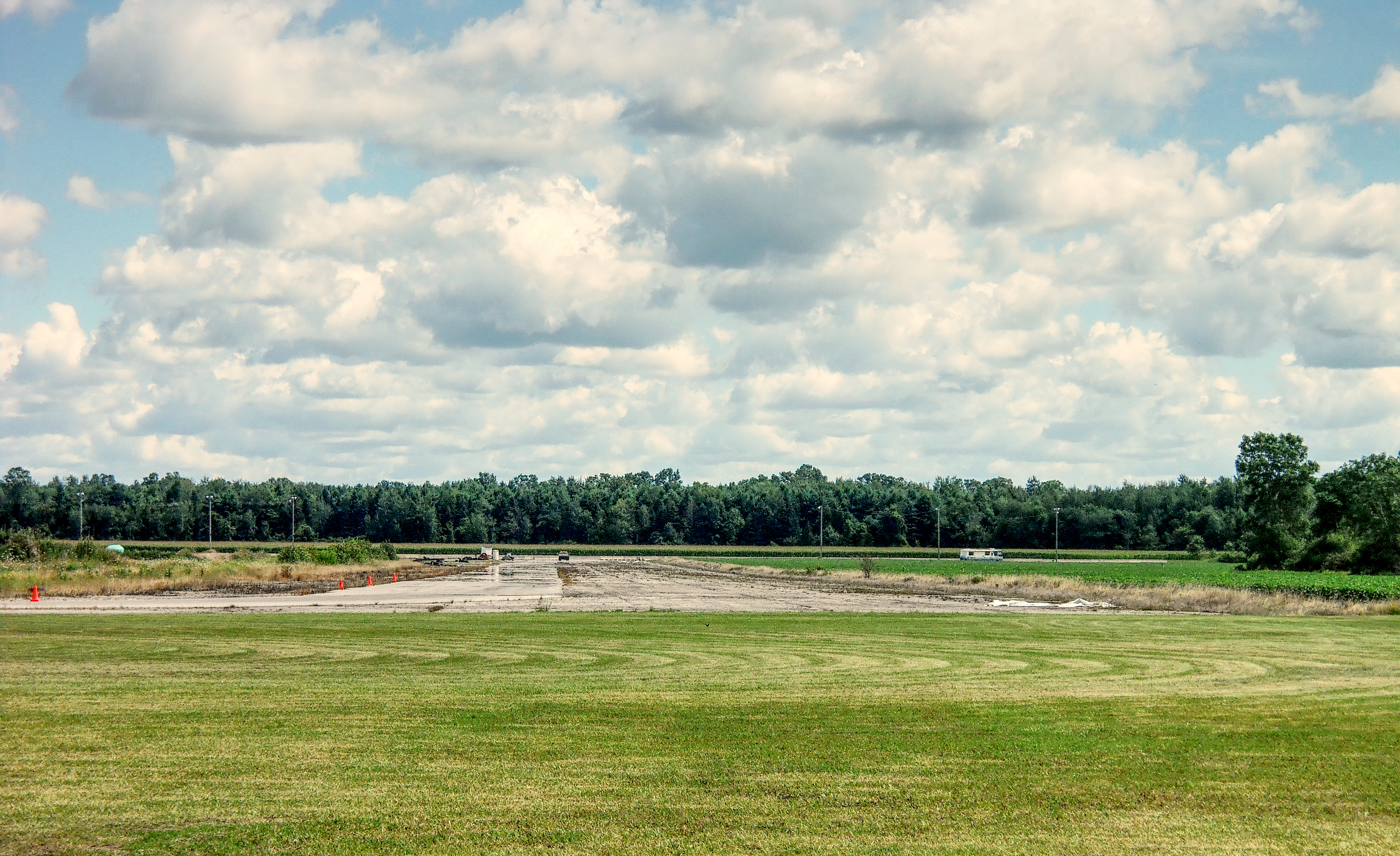
Runway 07, with race track surface on left side

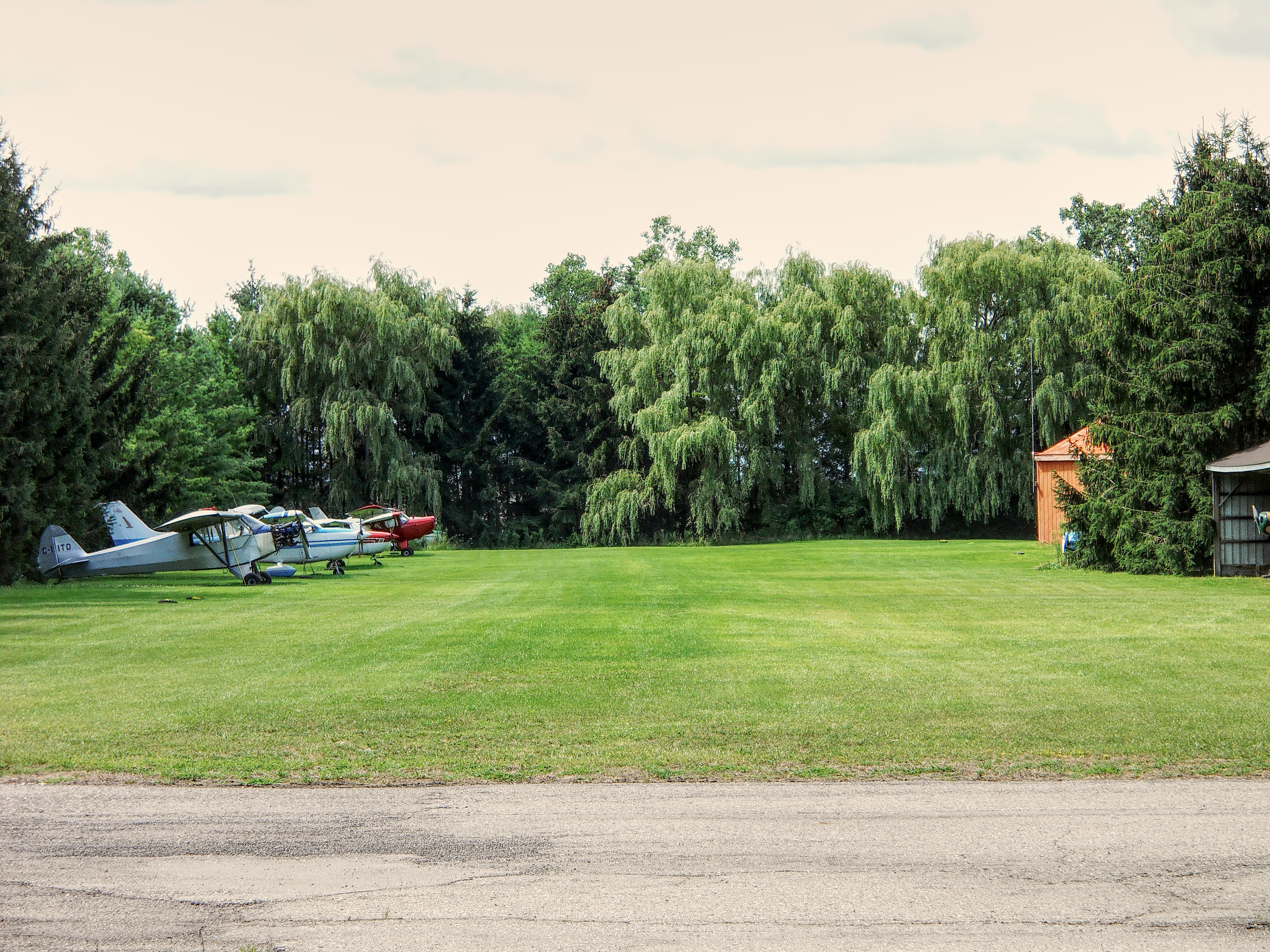
Private aircraft area near runway 07

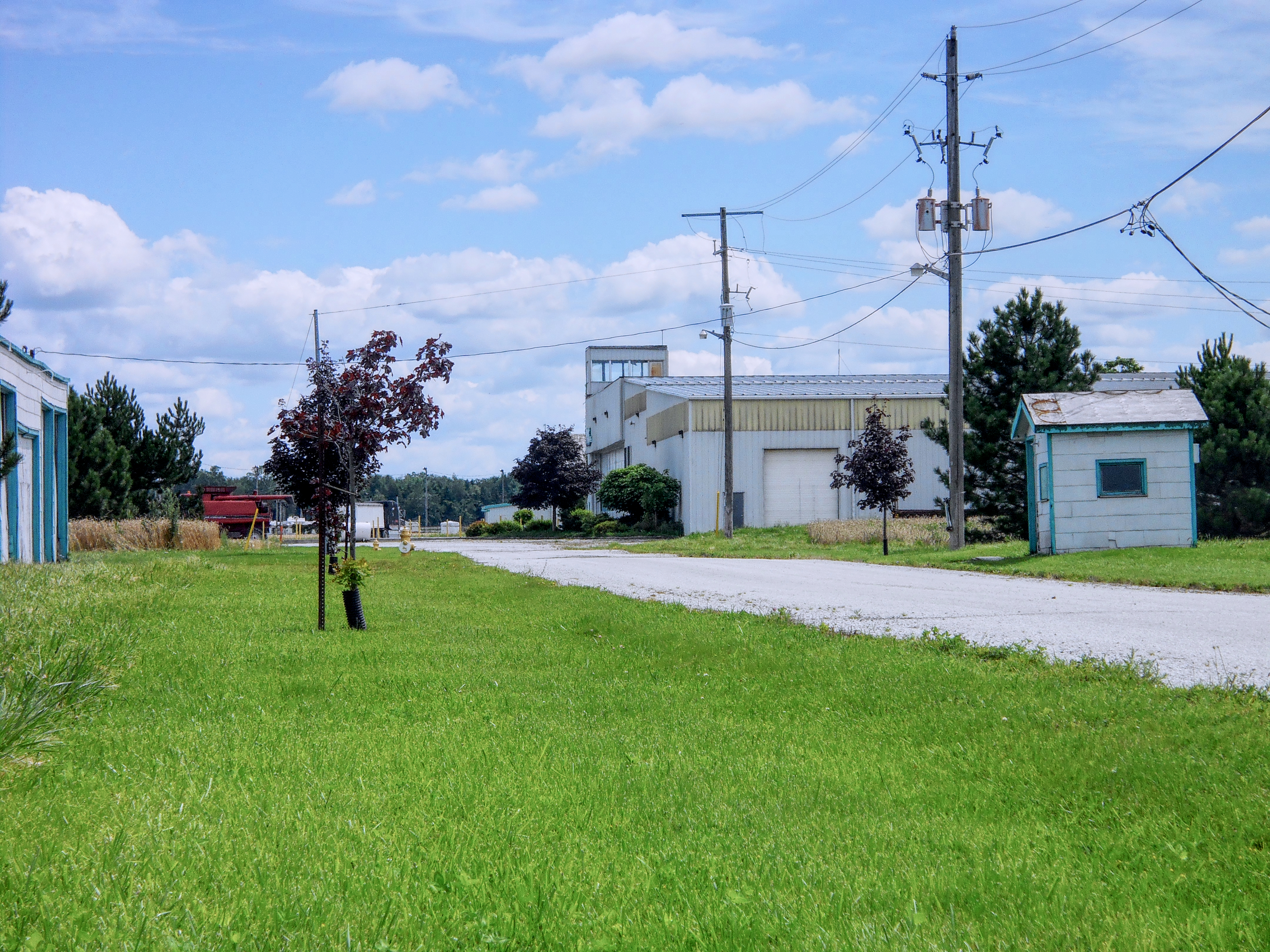
The RCAF main entrance

== Aerodrome information ==
In approximately 1942 the aerodrome was listed as RCAF Aerodrome - Grand Bend, Ontario at 43°17′N 81°43′W with a variation of 5 degrees west and elevation of 650 ft (200 m). The aerodrome was listed with three runways as follows:

Runway Name	Length	Width	Surface
9/25	2,600 ft (790 m)	150 ft (46 m)	Hard Surfaced
1/19	2,600 ft (790 m)	150 ft (46 m)	Hard Surfaced
13/31	3,100 ft (940 m)	150 ft (46 m)	Hard Surfaced

The Grand Bend Motorplex uses the original runway 13/31 as a drag racing track. Runway 01/19 is now an access to the dragstrip and also the Grand Bend Speedway oval and Grand Bend Motocross dirt bike tracks. The remaining runway 07/25 of the airfield is shared by the Grand Bend Raceway, the Grand Bend Sport Parachuting Center and some local private aircraft. The only RCAF building that remains is the hangar, with the control tower perched on top. The property was subsequently owned by Bell Aerospace, Exeter plastics and P.O.G. The aerodrome is now operated as the Grand Bend Airport.
