= Steven Truscott =

Canadian man wrongly convicted of murder (born 1945)

- Born: January 18, 1945 (age 81); Vancouver, British Columbia, Canada
- Status: Paroled (1969): Conviction overturned (2007)
- Conviction: Murder (overturned)
- Penalty: Death; commuted to life imprisonment

Steven Murray Truscott (born January 18, 1945) is a Canadian man who, at fourteen years old, was convicted and sentenced to death in September 1959 for the rape and murder of classmate Lynne Harper. Truscott was the last person known to see her alive. He was scheduled to be hanged; however, the federal cabinet reprieved him and he was sentenced to life in prison and released on parole in 1969. Five decades later, in 2007, his conviction was overturned on the basis that key forensic evidence was weaker than had been portrayed at trial, and key evidence in favour of Truscott was concealed from his defence team. Truscott has been described as the youngest person in Canada to be sentenced to death, although Anthony Wayne Yensen was 14 years and seven months old when he was sentenced to death on January 21, 1961, two months younger than Truscott was when he was sentenced. Yensen won a new trial in May 1961 and freed at a retrial the following month after judge said the case should not have been handled in adult court.

== Lynne Harper ==
Cheryl Lynne Harper was born to Leslie and Shirley Harper on August 31, 1946, in New Brunswick. She had one older brother, Barry Harper, who lived in Ohio, and a younger brother, Jeffrey. Her father was a school teacher before he joined the military in 1940. They relocated to the RCAF base at Clinton in July, 1957. Lynne spent time going to Sunday school, Bible class, and Girl Guides.

On June 9, 1959, Lynne—then 12 years of age—disappeared near RCAF Station Clinton, an air force base south of Clinton, Ontario in what is now Vanastra (roughly 80 kilometers north of London). Two days later, on the afternoon of June 11, searchers discovered her body in a nearby farm woodlot. Harper had been raped and had been strangled with her own blouse.

Steven Truscott and Harper had been classmates in a combined grades 7/8 class at the Air Vice Marshal Hugh Campbell School located on the north side of the Air Force base. In the early evening of Tuesday, June 9, 1959, Truscott had given Harper a ride on the crossbar of his bicycle and proceeded from the vicinity of the school northwards along the County Road. The timing and duration of their encounter, and what happened while they were together, have been contentious issues since 1959.

In court, the Crown contended that Truscott and Harper left the County Road before reaching the bridge over the Bayfield River and, in a wooded area beside the County Road (known as Lawson's Bush), Truscott raped and murdered Lynne. Truscott has maintained since 1959 that he took Harper to the intersection of the County Road and Highway 8, where he left her unharmed. Truscott maintains that when he arrived at the bridge, he looked back toward the intersection where he had dropped Harper off and observed that a vehicle had stopped and that she was in the process of entering it. On June 10, 1959 at 9:30 a.m. Steven was interviewed by (Constable) Hobbs in a cruiser at his school. He told Hobbs that while standing on the bridge, he saw Lynne get into a "late model Chevrolet" and there "was a lot of chrome on the car and it could have been a Bellair [sic] version." At 11:20 that evening, Lynne's father reported her missing. Truscott would later in his life after serving a multitude of years in prison (after his sentence was changed from the death penalty to life in prison) attempt to disprove his involvement in the rape and murder of Lynne. Truscott has now been cleared and was provided $6.5 million dollars in reparations.

== Arrest and trial ==
On June 12, shortly after 7:00 p.m., Truscott was taken into custody. At about 2:30 a.m. on June 13, he was charged with murder under the provisions of the Juvenile Delinquents Act. On June 30, Truscott was ordered to be tried as an adult; an appeal on that order was dismissed.

On September 16, Truscott's trial began in the then Supreme Court of Ontario in Goderich before Mr. Justice Ferguson and a jury. Steven Truscott was represented by Frank Donnelly; Glen Hays appeared for the Crown. All the evidence presented in court against the accused was circumstantial, and centred on placing Harper's death within a narrow time frame which implicated Truscott. Key to this narrow window was the autopsy doctor's testimony that the decomposition of Lynne's body and the state of partially digested food in her stomach indicated she had died near the precise time she was acknowledged to have been with Truscott. On September 30, the jury returned a verdict of guilty, with a recommendation for mercy. Justice Ferguson then sentenced Truscott to death by hanging.

On January 21, 1960, Truscott's appeal, put forth by John G. J. O'Driscoll to the Court of Appeal for Ontario was dismissed. Immediately afterwards, the Government of Canada commuted Truscott's sentence to life imprisonment. An application for leave to appeal to the Supreme Court of Canada was denied on February 24. On that date, Truscott did not have an automatic right to appeal to this court.

== Incarceration and parole ==
From his arrest until the commutation of his death sentence, Truscott was imprisoned at the Huron County Gaol in Goderich.

After the commutation of his sentence he was transferred to the Kingston Penitentiary for assessment and he was incarcerated at the Ontario Training School for Boys in Guelph from February 1960 to January 1963. On January 14, 1963, he was transferred to Collins Bay Penitentiary.

Truscott was transferred on May 7, 1967 to the Farm Annex of Collins Bay Penitentiary. On October 21, 1969, Truscott was released on parole and lived in Kingston with his parole officer and then in Vancouver for a brief period before settling in Guelph under an assumed name. He married and raised three children.

On November 12, 1974, Truscott was relieved of the terms and conditions of his parole by the National Parole Board.

== At the Supreme Court: the 1960s ==
Truscott's case was the focus of considerable public attention. In early 1966, Isabel LeBourdais argued in The Trial of Steven Truscott that Truscott had been convicted of a crime he did not commit, rekindling public debate and interest in the case. On April 26, 1966, the Government of Canada referred the Truscott case to the Supreme Court of Canada. Five days of evidence were heard by the Supreme Court of Canada in October 1966, followed by submissions in January 1967. That evidence included the testimony of Truscott, who had not testified at the 1959 trial. British pathologist Professor Keith Simpson was invited by the Canadian government to review the forensic evidence.

On May 4, 1967, the Supreme Court (Hall J. dissenting) held that, if Truscott's appeal had been heard by the court, it would have been dismissed.

New forensic evidence was presented on his behalf, and Truscott testified before the Supreme Court of Canada, telling his story for the first time. Truscott and 25 other witnesses testified before the Court. After a two-week hearing before the Supreme Court, Canada’s top judges ruled 8-1 against Truscott getting a new trial, and he was returned to prison to serve the remainder of his sentence. The Supreme Court stated that “There were many incredibilities inherent in the evidence given by Truscott before us and we do not believe his testimony.”

The joint opinion of Canada’s Supreme Court Justices was: “The verdict of the jury, read in the light of the charge of the trial judge, makes it clear that they were satisfied beyond a reasonable doubt that the facts, which they found to be established by the evidence which they accepted, were not only consistent with the guilt of Truscott but were inconsistent with any rational conclusion other than that Steven Truscott was the guilty person.”

== At the Ontario Court of Appeal: 2001–2007 ==
Truscott maintained a low profile until 2000, when an interview on CBC Television's investigative news program The Fifth Estate revived interest in his case. Together with a subsequent book by journalist Julian Sher, they suggested that evidence in favour of Truscott's innocence had been ignored in the original trial. The documentary suggested that Harper's real killer may have been Alexander Kalichuk, a Royal Canadian Air Force Sergeant who had a history of sexual offences and who had died in 1975.

On November 28, 2001, James Lockyer led the Association in Defence of the Wrongly Convicted to file an appeal to have the case reopened. On January 24, 2002, retired Quebec Justice Fred Kaufman was appointed by the federal government to review the case. On October 28, 2004, Justice Minister Irwin Cotler directed a Reference pursuant to section 696.3(a)(ii) of the Criminal Code to the Court of Appeal for Ontario to review whether new evidence would have changed the 1959 verdict.

On April 6, 2006, the body of Lynne Harper was exhumed by order of the Attorney General of Ontario, in order to test for DNA evidence. There was hope that this would bring some closure to the case, but no usable DNA was recovered from the remains.

Blow flies, maggots and insect activity on Harper's body were capable of raising a "reasonable doubt" whether she died before 8 p.m. – and could suggest she died as late as the next day, although the court said there was no realistic possibility that entomology could have assisted in solving the murder in 1959. However, samples of insects and maggots were collected from the body at the time, and the science has since evolved. By knowing when insects deposit their eggs or larvae on a corpse, experts can estimate time of death. The evidence did not rule out that Lynne died at the time stated by the Crown.

Truscott's conviction was brought to the Court of Appeal for Ontario on June 19, 2006. The five-judge panel, headed by Ontario Chief Justice Roy McMurtry and including Justice Michael Moldaver, heard three weeks of testimony and fresh evidence. On January 31, 2007, the Court of Appeal for Ontario began hearing arguments from Truscott's defence in the appeal of Truscott's conviction. Arguments were heard by the court over a period of ten days, concluding February 10. In addition to the notoriety of the case itself, the hearing is also notable for being the first time that cameras were allowed into a hearing of the Court of Appeal for Ontario.

The Court of Appeal heard evidence, including earlier versions of draft autopsy reports, that contradicted the supposed narrow window for Harper's time of death. Pathologist Dr. John Penistan had in fact provided three different estimates for this time period, the first two of which would have excluded Truscott as a suspect. Only after the police had narrowed on Truscott as the prime suspect did Penistan provide "forensic proof" that Harper had died exactly around the time that implicated Truscott. His original estimates and draft autopsy reports were concealed from the defence and the court.

In addition, an elderly couple had told investigators soon after the murder that they had spotted a young girl hitchhiking at the time and place where Truscott stated he had left Harper. Bob Lawson, the farmer who owned the property including Lawson's Bush, testified during the appeal that he and a neighbor saw a strange car parked near his fence, apparently with a man and a girl inside, the night the 12-year-old disappeared, and had reported it to the RCAF guardhouse.

During the review Justice Moldaver asked retired OPP officer Harry "Hank" Sayeau (who assisted Inspector Harold Graham) why the police never considered a sexual psychopath might be responsible for Harper's rape and murder before they narrowed their focus on a fourteen-year-old: "Did the thought ever cross your mind that, for someone to strangle her then sexually assault her, you might want to be looking for someone who is more of a pervert, more of a sexual psychopath?" "I don't recall that", said the eighty-four-year-old Harry Sayeau.

On August 28, 2007, the Court of Appeal acquitted Truscott of the charges. Truscott's defence team had originally asked for a declaration of factual innocence, which would mean that Truscott would be declared innocent, and not merely unable to be found guilty beyond a reasonable doubt. Although they issued the acquittal, the court said it was not in a position to declare Truscott innocent of the crime. "The appellant has not demonstrated his factual innocence," the court wrote. "At this time, and on the totality of the record, we are in no position to make a declaration of innocence." Within the Court's 2006 judgement, as they reviewed the evidence against Truscott, the Court wrote that "In these circumstances, we cannot say that an acquittal is the only reasonable verdict."

Attorney General of Ontario Michael Bryant apologized to Truscott on behalf of the provincial government, stating they were "truly sorry" for the miscarriage of justice.

Many, including Harper's family, have never thought that Truscott was innocent of the murder, and in July 2008 Harper's brother described Truscott's compensation package as "a real travesty" and indicated he would not inform their father for fear the news would upset him.

== Cultural aspects ==
The 1975 film, directed by Murray Markowitz, called Recommendation for Mercy, was based fully on the Truscott case, though different names were introduced into the plot. Andrew Skidd starred.

The plot of Ann-Marie MacDonald's 2003 novel The Way the Crow Flies is based on a fictionalized version of the Truscott case, and the surrounding community's reaction to the incident. MacDonald herself was raised in the same region, during the same time period as the Truscott case.

In protest of the harsh sentence, notable Canadian writer Pierre Berton wrote a poem, Requiem for a Fourteen-Year-Old.

Canadian rock band Blue Rodeo recorded a song, "Truscott", which referenced the case, on their 2000 album The Days in Between.

The TV show The Fifth Estate released in March 29 2000. Season 25 episode 3 “His word against History. It was filmed in Vanastra and used residents of the town as extras. It featured interviews with Truscott himself set against dramatized depictions of the events.

Laurier LaPierre, co-host of a CBC news show, This Hour Has Seven Days, was fired after shedding a tear in response to an interview with Truscott's mother, Doris. LaPierre's reaction – quickly wiping away tears under one eye and speaking in a shaky voice – infuriated CBC president Alphonse Ouimet. The president, already a critic of Seven Days, took it as proof that LaPierre was "unprofessional". The popular show was cancelled, and the other co-host, Patrick Watson, was also fired over the incident.

The case was dramatized in a 1993 episode of the CBC drama anthology series Scales of Justice, with Zachary Ansley playing Truscott in reenactments of both Truscott's original trial and his first Supreme Court appeal.

A play called Innocence Lost, written by Beverley Cooper and based on Truscott's conviction, was featured at the Blyth Festival Theatre in Blyth, Ontario during the summer 2008 season. It was a finalist for the Governor General's Award for English-language drama in 2008. The play was remounted again in the company's 2009 season and was again playing in 2013 in various Ontario localities including Toronto, Ottawa and at London Community Players in London. Its Western Canadian premiere was at Langara College's Studio 58 in 2014.

The 2020 film Marlene tells the story of the Steven Truscott (Greg Bryk) case and how his wife Marlene Truscott (Kristin Booth) worked tirelessly to clear her husband's name by exposing lies, cover-ups, and police mishandling of the case.

In 2024, it was revealed that, prior to her death, Canadian author and Nobel Laureate Alice Munro had suspected her husband Gerald Fremlin may have been involved in Lynne Harper's murder.

== See also ==
- Overturned convictions in Canada
- List of miscarriage of justice cases
