= NATO Air Training Plan =

The NATO Air Training Plan was an aircrew training program which ran from 1950–1958, authorized by NATO, and implemented by the Royal Canadian Air Force (RCAF). The program trained pilots and navigators from NATO signatory countries with the purpose of improving NATO airpower in response to the perceived military threat in Europe from Soviet bloc countries.

Like the British Commonwealth Air Training Plan (BCATP) of the Second World War, Canada was chosen because of its remoteness from the potential battle areas in Europe. Also, like the BCATP, the NATO Air Training Plan trained aircrew from many countries other than Canada and the United Kingdom, and used air stations throughout Canada, with many located on the prairies well away from congested urban areas and where the land was open and flat. Many of the old BCATP stations were expanded and used for the NATO training program. Trainees came from such countries as the UK, Denmark, Norway, the Netherlands, France, Portugal, Turkey, West Germany, Belgium, Greece, and Italy.

Training began at RCAF Station London, Ontario, at the NATO Training & Induction School ( relocated to RCAF Station Centralia in 1954) where students were familiarized with RCAF aircraft and flying terminology, and were taught flight procedures, meteorology, basic navigation and basic English. Student navigators went to an Air Navigation School (ANS) such as RCAF Station Winnipeg or RCAF Station Summerside. For pilots, the next step was Flying Training School (FTS) using Harvard aircraft. Training continued on Canadair CT-133 Silver Star jet trainers, Beechcraft Expeditors, or Mitchells at an Advanced Flying School (AFS). Training changed in 1956 when a Primary Flying Training school was opened at RCAF Station Centralia. At Centralia, student pilots first trained on de Havilland Chipmunks and then on Harvards. After primary training, pilots were selected to train on multi-engine aircraft or single-engine aircraft. For multi-engine aircraft, trainees went to an Advanced Flying School where they would train on Expeditors or Mitchells. For single-engine aircraft, trainees would go to one of several other Advanced Flying Schools using T-33 jet trainers such as RCAF Station Gimli. RCAF graduate pilots would be posted to an Operational Training Unit (OTU) where they would learn to fly operational aircraft. Foreign pilot graduates would be sent home.

By 1957, many of the countries involved had their own training facilities so the program began to wind down. Limited bilateral training continued, however, for countries unable to train their own aircrew. Two of these countries were Denmark and Norway.

Canada currently operates a similar program called NATO Flying Training in Canada (NFTC).
