= The Trial of Steven Truscott =

Book by Isabel LeBourdais

The Trial of Steven Truscott is a book written by Isabel LeBourdais, published in 1966, on the trial and conviction of Steven Truscott for the murder of Lynne Harper in 1959. The book "attacked the rapid police investigation and trial, calling into question a justice system that many people then considered infallible." More information is available by reading the book Until You Are Dead.

Professor Keith Simpson was invited by the Canadian government to review the forensic evidence in these light of these allegations. He was highly critical of the way in which the book had discussed the forensic data.

== Footnotes ==
- Simpson, Keith (1978). Forty Years of Murder: An Autobiography. London: Harrap. ISBN 0-245-53198-X.
