= RCAF Station Centralia =

- Centralia, Ontario in Canada
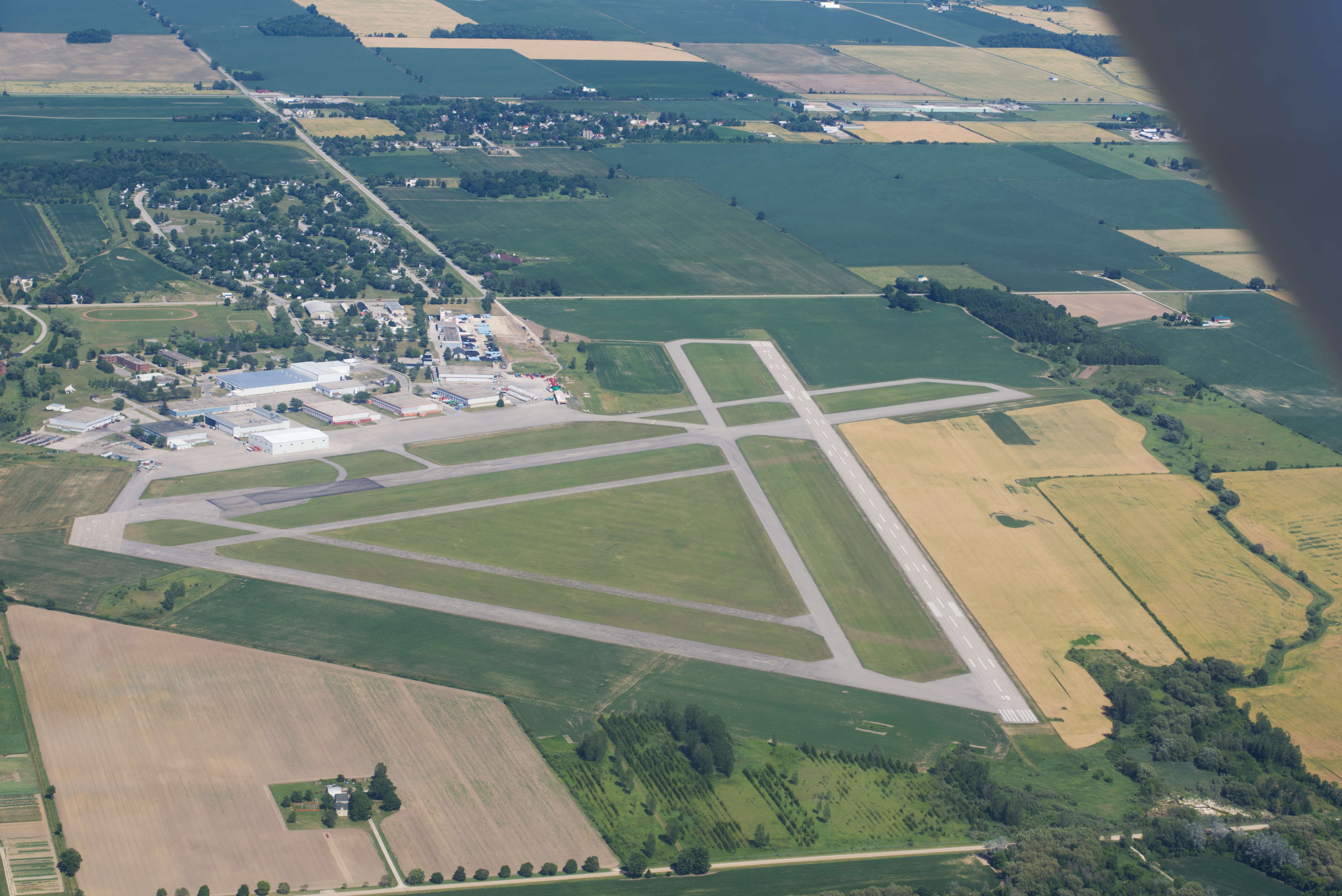
- The former RCAF station in 2020

Site information
- Owner: Department of National Defence
- Operator: RCAF

Location

Airfield information
- Elevation: 810 ft (250 m) AMSL
Runways
Direction	Length and surface
4/22	2,700 ft (820 m) Hard
10/28	2,700 ft (820 m) Hard
16/34	2,700 ft (820 m) Hard

RCAF Station Centralia was a Royal Canadian Air Force training base located just outside the village of Centralia near Exeter, Ontario, Canada. It became one of the largest training stations in Canada. It was turned over to civilian use after 1967, and currently operates as the Centralia/James T. Field Memorial Aerodrome.

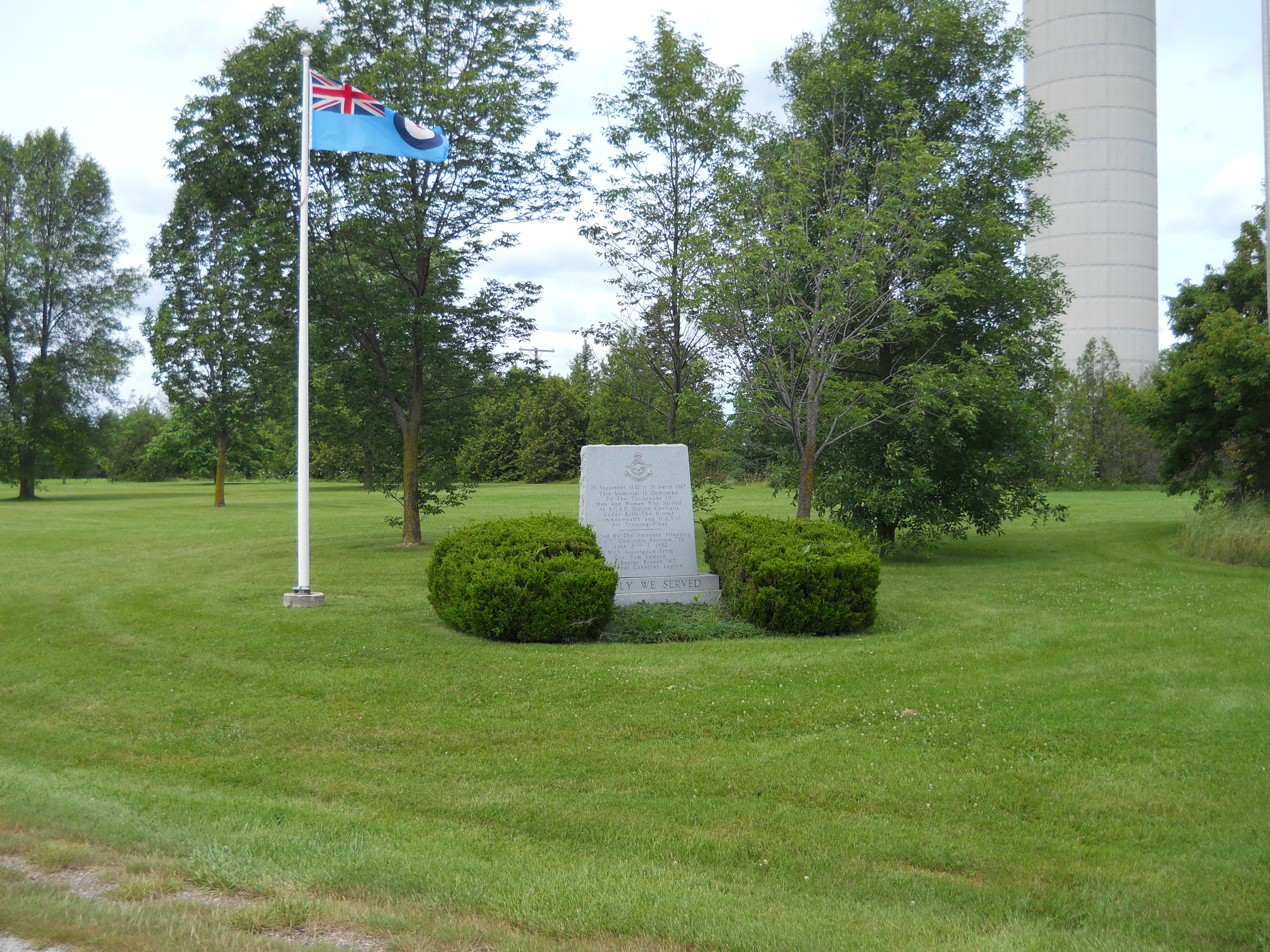
The Monument on Airport Line

== History ==
=== World War II ===
Flying schools were established across Canada as part of the British Commonwealth Air Training Plan during World War II. Centralia was the location for No. 9 Service Flying Training School (SFTS). Service Flying Training Schools provided advanced training to pilots who had graduated from Elementary Flying Training Schools (EFTSs). Trainee pilots flew the Avro Anson and North American Harvard. No. 9 SFTS had moved to Centralia from RCAF Station Summerside, Prince Edward Island, in July 1942. Relief landing fields for Centralia were located at Grand Bend and St. Joseph.

No. 9 SFTS ceased operation in June 1945 and was replaced by No. 1 Aircrew Conditioning Unit (ACU). ACUs trained service personnel for operations in the war's Pacific theatre. When No. 1 ACU was closed after the war, the RCAF formed No. 1 Flying Training School (No. 1 FTS) which used Ansons and Harvards. The first and last flying course was in January 1946. The course lasted for three weeks before it was cancelled.

=== Aerodrome information ===
In approximately 1942 the aerodrome was listed as RCAF Aerodrome - Centralia, Ontario at 43°18′N 81°31′W with a variation of 5 degrees west and elevation of 810 ft (250 m). The aerodrome was listed as "Under construction" with three runways as follows:

Runway Name	Length	Width	Surface
4/22	2,700 ft (820 m)	150 ft (46 m)	Hard Surfaced
10/28	2,700 ft (820 m)	150 ft (46 m)	Hard Surfaced
16/34	2,700 ft (820 m)	150 ft (46 m)	Hard Surfaced

=== Postwar ===
Because of increasing tensions between the Soviet Bloc and the West, defence expenditures were increased and the Canadian forces were strengthened. Centralia, along with a number of other stations, underwent major rehabilitation to better accommodate aircrew training.

Centralia was reactivated in January 1947 to provide accommodation and training facilities for No. 1 Radar and Communications School (No. 1 R&CS) that was based in nearby RCAF Station Clinton. No. 1 Instrument Flying School (IFS) was relocated to Centralia from RCAF Station Trenton in the spring of 1947. This school gave students an opportunity to obtain their instrument rating qualifications. The Expeditor was the aircraft used for this training. In 1956, No. 1 IFS moved to RCAF Station Saskatoon, Saskatchewan.

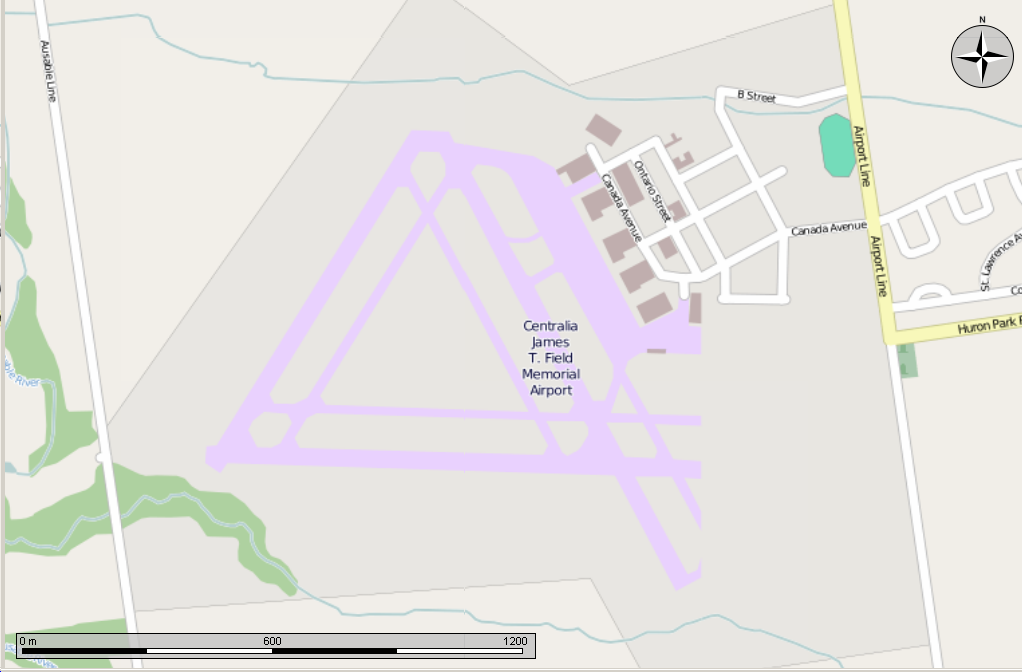
Map of the airfield, now known as the Centralia James T. Field Memorial Airport

RCAF Station Centralia became the aerodrome's official designation in September 1947 and No. 1 Flying Training School was reactivated. Students participating in this school flew Harvards. No. 1 FTS was one of Canada's contributions to the training of foreign airmen for a new multinational force. The last FTS course was completed in March 1957 and No. 1 Flying Training School was deactivated and merged with the Advanced Flying School at Saskatoon. The Harvards used for FTS training were transferred to western flying training schools.

In April 1948, the RCAF's School of Flying Control was formed at Centralia. The school trained Flying Control Officers and Aircraft Control Assistants for deployment in control towers and operations rooms in RCAF stations. In May, a flying detachment for the No. 1 Air Radio Officers School based at RCAF Station Clinton was established.

Centralia was actively involved with the NATO Air Training Plan. The NATO Training & Induction School, originally located at RCAF Station London, re-located to RCAF Station Centralia in 1954. The school's purpose was to inform personnel about various aspects of working with NATO. In October 1954, the Pre-Flight School was formed at Centralia. This school provided ground instruction to students before they began flight training. In 1956 Centralia began hosting the Primary Flying Training School using the Chipmunk. Graduate pilots were sent to western Canada for more advanced training on Harvards.

No.2 Personnel Selection Unit (PSU), which was responsible for tri-service officer selection for ROTP and air crew, moved to Centralia from RCAF Station London in 1958.

=== Closure ===
In the late 1960s, the Canadian military was reorganized and eventually unified. The reorganization resulted in many military bases being closed, including Centralia, which closed on 31 March 1967. Functions provided by Centralia were moved to various other stations.

Today the airport still operates as Centralia/James T. Field Memorial Aerodrome. Some of the former RCAF buildings remain.
