= Isabel LeBourdais =

Canadian journalist and author

Isabel LeBourdais born Isabel Russel Erichsen-Brown (15 April 1909 – 2003) was a Canadian journalist and writer. She is best known as the author of the 1966 book The Trial of Steven Truscott, the first major work to argue that Steven Truscott had been wrongfully convicted of murder. LeBourdais's book was instrumental in pushing the federal government to ask the Supreme Court to review the trial in 1966. Eventually, in August 2007, after many years of legal proceedings, the Ontario Court of Appeal overturned the conviction stating it was a "miscarriage of justice" that "must be quashed."

Educated at Havergal College and the University of Toronto, she left university in 1928 to marry Lt. Stephen Holmes Dale, whom she divorced four years later. She subsequently became a social activist, and joined the Co-operative Commonwealth Federation. She married writer and CCF politician D. M. LeBourdais in 1942. She continued working as a journalist and activist until publishing the Truscott book. Thereafter, she became a public relations officer for the Registered Nurses Association of Ontario.

She was the sister of novelist Gwethalyn Graham.
