= Pole Vault (communications system) =

First operational troposcatter system

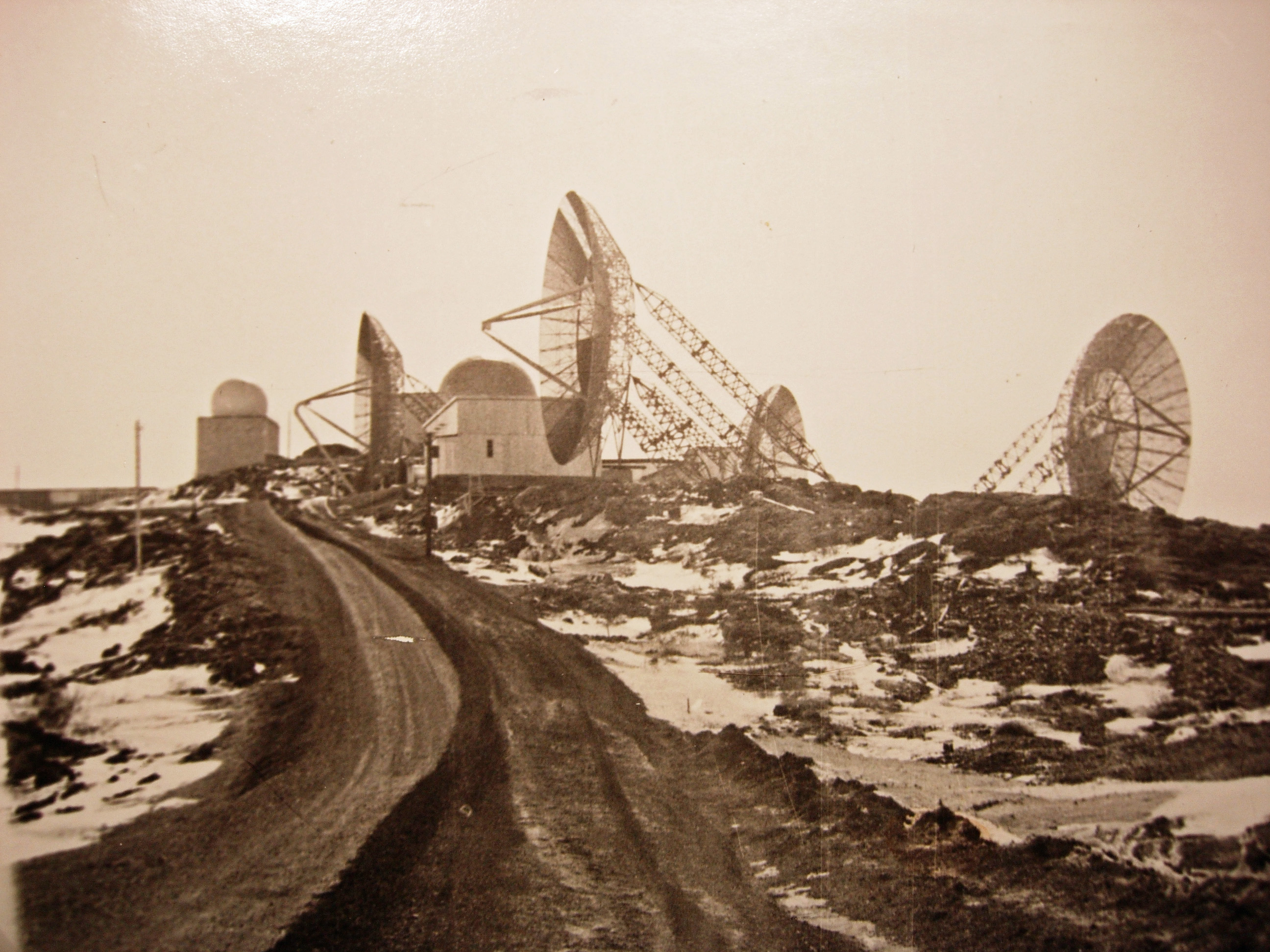
- St. Anthony was a typical mid-line Pole Vault system with transmit and receive antennas facing the next stations to the north and south.
- Active: 1955–1975
- Country: Canada
- Branch: Royal Canadian Air Force; United States Air Force
- Type: Tropospheric scatter
- Role: Military communications
- Part of: North American Aerospace Defense Command
- Garrison/HQ: Pepperrell Air Force Base

Pole Vault was the first operational tropospheric scatter communications system. It linked radar sites and military airfields in Greenland and eastern Canada by telephone to send aircraft tracking and warning information across North America. The line stretched from Thule Air Force Base in northern Greenland, to Baffin Island and then along the eastern coast of Labrador and Newfoundland to St. John's for connection into existing commercial telecommunications networks.

The system was first proposed in 1952 to send information along the isolated Pinetree Line stations on the Labrador coast. This led to an initial proposal to use a microwave relay system, a relatively new technology at the time. The network would require 50 relays, many of them in the wilderness. Bell Canada won the contract to build the system after the USAF was convinced they could handle the job.

Before construction began, Bell learned of experiments with long-range troposcatter systems being carried out in the US by Bell Labs and MIT Lincoln Laboratory. These were limited by power, not the line of sight, greatly extending the range between stations. They borrowed one system for testing in Labrador and by late 1954 had successfully demonstrated links of several hundred kilometres. This allowed them to reduce the network to only 10 stations, all at the existing radar sites.

The first message was sent on the network on February 14, 1955, but due to the extension to Thule and upgrades to carry more lines at the behest of the USAF it was not finally handed over until December 31, 1956. The system was used operationally until 1975 when it was replaced by newer systems including ionospheric skip systems, underwater cables and, eventually, satellite communications.

== History ==
=== Pinetree problems ===
The Pinetree Line began as early studies in 1946 for a radar network for the northern continental United States (CONUS). It was soon extended northward into Canada as the Royal Canadian Air Force (RCAF) expressed interest in joining the network. Moving the line northward presented the problem of sending tracking data between the stations and especially back to various headquarters. For stations in the west, which were generally located close to existing population centers, leased lines were a suitable solution. Such was not the case for the eastern areas on the Line, where northern areas were little developed.

To solve a local problem near the Ontario and Quebec border, starting in 1950 the RCAF began construction of a microwave relay system known as ADCOM. This was a version of the Wireless Set Number 10 system developed by the British during World War II for tactical communications and links from France back to England. The Canadian Signals Research and Development Establishment (CSRDE) developed a dual-frequency version of this system and was pressing for it to be used on a number of Pinetree-related projects. Project management issues and creeping featuritis led to the initial price estimate of the system, about $5 million, going up several times and eventually reaching $22 million (equivalent to $254,400,000 in 2025) by the time it was fully operational.

The Pinetree Line's eastern barrier was a line of stations running from St. Johns and Stephenville on Newfoundland and then northward along the Labrador coast before ending on Baffin Island at Crystal II airbase at Frobisher Bay, a total distance of 1,400 mi (2,250 km). The majority of this portion of the Line is among almost uninhabited areas and there was little or no existing telephony available. These sites had instead been equipped with conventional high frequency radio links, but these soon proved inadequate.

In May 1952, the Department of Defence Production (DDP) suggested building a microwave network for these stations too. The DDP proposed solution was similar to the one used by ADCOM. Given the problems with ADCOM, the U.S. contingent of the Pinetree Project Office (PPO) proved sceptical although they reluctantly agreed to the project.

=== Initial concept ===
In May 1952, Alex Lester was loaned from Bell Canada to the Electronics Division of the DDP to coordinate the military's communications developments with Bell. He soon learned of the problems with the Pinetree Line's communications, and approached Thomas Wardrope Eadie, then Vice President of Operations at Bell, with the idea that Bell would offer to take on construction management of the line.

This led to further project studies that considered forming a new crown corporation to handle development, telling the U.S. to do it, or contracting Bell. The government was averse to creating new crown corporations, and was very concerned that handing it to the U.S. would result in a loss of opportunity for Canadian workers, and so Bell was in. They also reconsidered various technologies, including underwater lines, but concerns over the storm-tossed waters and 40 foot (12 m) tides in Frobisher Bay suggested this would not be reliable and the microwave relay appeared to be the only solution.

Thus the concept settled on an initial system of twenty relays covering the 700 miles (1,100 km) from CFB Gander to CFB Goose Bay, and then a second stage with another thirty towers that would expand it northward to Frobisher Bay and southward to St. John's and westward to Stephenville. The network would be based on the commercial 2.4 GHz TD2 system being deployed by AT&T in the U.S., and soon in Canada as well. This system would use frequency division multiplexing to carry 36 voice channels across a series of selected frequencies. On November 4, 1952, Bell gave the DDP their initial proposal.

The next day they learned that the PPO was already well along the process of accepting the ADCOM-like system being proposed by the CSRDE. This used two separate frequencies, one at 2.0 GHz and another at 400 MHz, to allow switching between the two to avoid interference. The matter was then sent back to the U.S. for review. After months of silence, on April 2, 1953, the DDP sent a letter to Bell, Canadian Pacific Railway and Canadian National Railway, at that time the only three firms with national telecommunications experience, stating they would be taking bids on the system based on the CSRDE concept.

In an April 30 letter, Bell agreed to bid on the project, but only if the risks of using the CSRDE system were acknowledged. This was accepted, and on July 23 the contract with the DDP was signed. The phase one development for the sites between Goose Bay and Gander had a handover date of September 30, 1955. The radio systems were provided by third parties; Canadian General Electric produced the 2.0 GHz system while Canadian Westinghouse supplied the 400 MHz system, and Canadian Marconi supplied various other pieces of equipment. A test link was operational between Bell's corporate office in downtown Montreal and Ormstown, southwest of the city about 50 kilometres (31 mi) away. Further testing was needed, but progress was being made.

=== Troposcatter takes over ===
Previous to World War II, prevailing radio physics theory predicted a relationship between frequency and diffraction that suggested radio signals would follow the curvature of the Earth, but that the strength of the effect fell off rapidly and especially at higher frequencies. However, during the war, there were numerous incidents in which high-frequency radar signals were detecting targets at ranges far beyond the theoretical calculations. In the immediate post-war era, the limitation on television construction was lifted and millions of sets were sold. This led to further examples of very long-range reception, which was a significant problem when widely separated stations given the same frequency allocations would interfere with each other at ranges that the equations stated would not be a problem. As a result, new stations were put on hold in what is known as the "television freeze" in 1948.

At the same time, AT&T was beginning experiments with the early TD2 network. They too saw examples of interference between far-separated towers. In 1950, Kenneth Bullington (Note: The name is given as "Kenneth Bulling" in the original article, but the November 1958 edition of Bell Laboratory Record records the Stuart Ballantine Medal being awarded to "Bullington", hyphenated between Bulling and ton, which likely led to the later confusion.) of Bell Labs published a report on the topic that demonstrated over-the-horizon transmission was possible at high frequencies using the previously unknown phenomenon of scattering off the troposphere. Scattering off the ionosphere was a well-known phenomenon used since the earliest days of radio, but only worked at lower frequencies and the similar effect with the troposphere had remained undetected until high-power UHF signals began being used.

The possibility of using this concept for long-distance communications was obvious, and Bell Labs soon started an experiment series with the researchers at the Lincoln Laboratory, a radar research centre affiliated with MIT. They began experimental tests in early 1952. In their August 1952 proposal, Bell agreed to liaise with their counterparts in the U.S., and learned of the experiments. This was extremely appealing; relay links were typically on the order of 30 miles (48 km), the local horizon, but this new system could operate over distances at least five times as great.

Bell proposed that the pressing need to link Goose Bay and Gander be carried out with the original relay system as soon as possible, but that the rest of the links in the chain be delayed until the results of the experimental system could be examined. In the fall of 1952, Bell Labs agreed to send their system to Bell Canada for cold weather testing in Labrador for a series of experiments that would last about a year. Meanwhile, similar tests were taking place in the southern U.S. to determine which frequencies worked best, and this determined that the original 2 GHz range was not as effective as lower frequencies between 500 and 1000 MHz. Bell's tests in Labrador were extremely favourable and both Bell Canada and Bell Labs agreed that the system was ready for development.

Bell proposed a new network with stations co-located at the Pinetree stations, about 150 miles (240 km) apart. If this proved too challenging in practice, additional stations could be built at the midpoints. The original network of 50 stations for the entire network was reduced to 10, all at sites with existing logistics support. The initial concept was for the southern sections to have 36 voice channels as far north as Hopedale, 24 circuits to Resolution Island and then 12 on the final short hop to Frobisher Bay. The estimated cost of the original relay system was $41 million, but widely expected to run over this. The new system was expected to be much less expensive.

=== Construction ===
The U.S. had been skeptical of the CSRDE system all along, and when Bell presented their results in the fall of 1953 the USAF proposed replacing the entire system including the link from Goose Bay to Gander. General Blake of the USAF began working with the PPO and had approval for the new concept in January 1954. At the time, Thule Air Force Base was connected to the continental USA via an underwater cable. This proved highly unreliable as it was repeatedly cut by fishing trawlers. The USAF requested that the line be extended to Thule via a relay at Cape Dyer. A final plan was signed on January 7, 1954, with the target completion date of the initial network in February 1955. The original contract was modified, adding the scatter network to the original microwave relay system.

The first pieces of equipment to be contracted were the 36 60 foot (18 m) parabolic antennas, signed on February 10 for initial delivery starting in July. These needed to be able to withstand a 120 knots (220 km/h; 140 mph) wind or 100 knots (190 km/h; 120 mph) when covered in ice. Contracts for the electronics soon followed, along with contracts for physical construction. The 10 kilowatt UHF transmitters, compared to 5 watt klystrons used in point-to-point relays, was sourced from Radio Engineering Laboratories in New York. For the later links between Cape Dyer and Thule even larger transmitters were used, 50 kW.

Work continued on the microwave system as well, but ultimately only the first two stations starting from Goose Bay were built before the project was cancelled in favour of the scatter system. This was formalized in September 1956 when a final contract amendment changed the wording so that Bell was now responsible only for design of the relay, not its construction.

The formal construction contract with Olmstead Air Force Base, the contracting authority, was signed on March 23, 1954. Construction began in mid-April and the first station at Goose Bay was completed in 6 weeks. Based on this success, the USAF also gave Bell the contract for building the local telephone switches at a number of other stations, including Thule and Pepperrell Air Force Base in St. Johns. This was followed by an April 28 bid on stations at Harmon Field (Stephensville) and Sondrestrom and Narssarssuaq on Greenland.

The first test connection was made along the initial six stations on February 14, 1955. The line was declared fully operational end-to-end on December 31, 1956. The total cost came to $24,590,000 (equivalent to $282,355,105 in 2025), significantly less than the original relay system. It was the first operational troposcatter system in the world.

=== Upgrades ===
By the time the system was operational, planning for two new radar lines was well advanced. Running across the middle of Canada was the Mid-Canada Line (MCL), whose eastern end was co-located with the Pinetree site at Hopedale, and far to the north was the DEW Line that ended at Cape Dyer.

The MCL had the advantage that it was built on towers and had to be line-of-sight with each other, meaning the existing microwave relay technology could be used to link the stations together. As most of the stations were unmanned, the amount of data was very limited, basically forwarding the radar signal to one of the eight sector control centers where they were monitored. This did leave the problem of carrying the information from the sector controls to the command and control centers further south, which was handled by sending the information to James Bay where a new troposcatter system sent it south where it continued on using the ADCOM system. The eastern end linked through Pole Vault.

The DEW line required much greater communications capacity, which led to a new troposcatter system being installed, the White Alice Communications System. This stretched across Alaska and the northern coast of Canada with additional links southward using both troposcatter and ionospheric relay for even longer connections. This also connected to the Pole Vault system at Cape Dyer, and an additional link from Thule to Hall Beach and then ionosphere skip to the MCL at RCAF Station Bird in Manitoba.

The installation of the Ballistic Missile Early Warning System (BMEWS) required links not only in the U.S. and Canada, but also across the Atlantic to Iceland and the UK where it also linked to existing radars. For this task a new system was installed, the North Atlantic Radio System (NARS). Bell was contracted to help build stations in this network, at Sondrestrom and Narssarssuaq on Greenland, linking to Cape Dyer. This system went operational in 1961. NARS also served as the trans-Atlantic portion of the Allied Command Europe Highband (ACE High) network which extended links across Europe. As the number of links increased, Pole Vault had to be upgraded to handle up to 70 circuits. (Note: Given the use of standard modules based on units of 6, this is likely 72 channels.)

=== Shutdown ===
Advances in communications were continual from the 1950s and a number of new technologies emerged that began to compete with Pole Vault. Notable among these were greatly improved submarine cables, which led to the installation of a high-capacity system from Thule to Cape Dyer, and then on to Newfoundland. The addition of satellite communications for high-value links further eroded the value of the system. It was eventually shut down in 1975. Other sections of the system remained in use, notably the endpoint at Cape Dyer which was still used for NARS and ACE High traffic for some time.

== Description ==
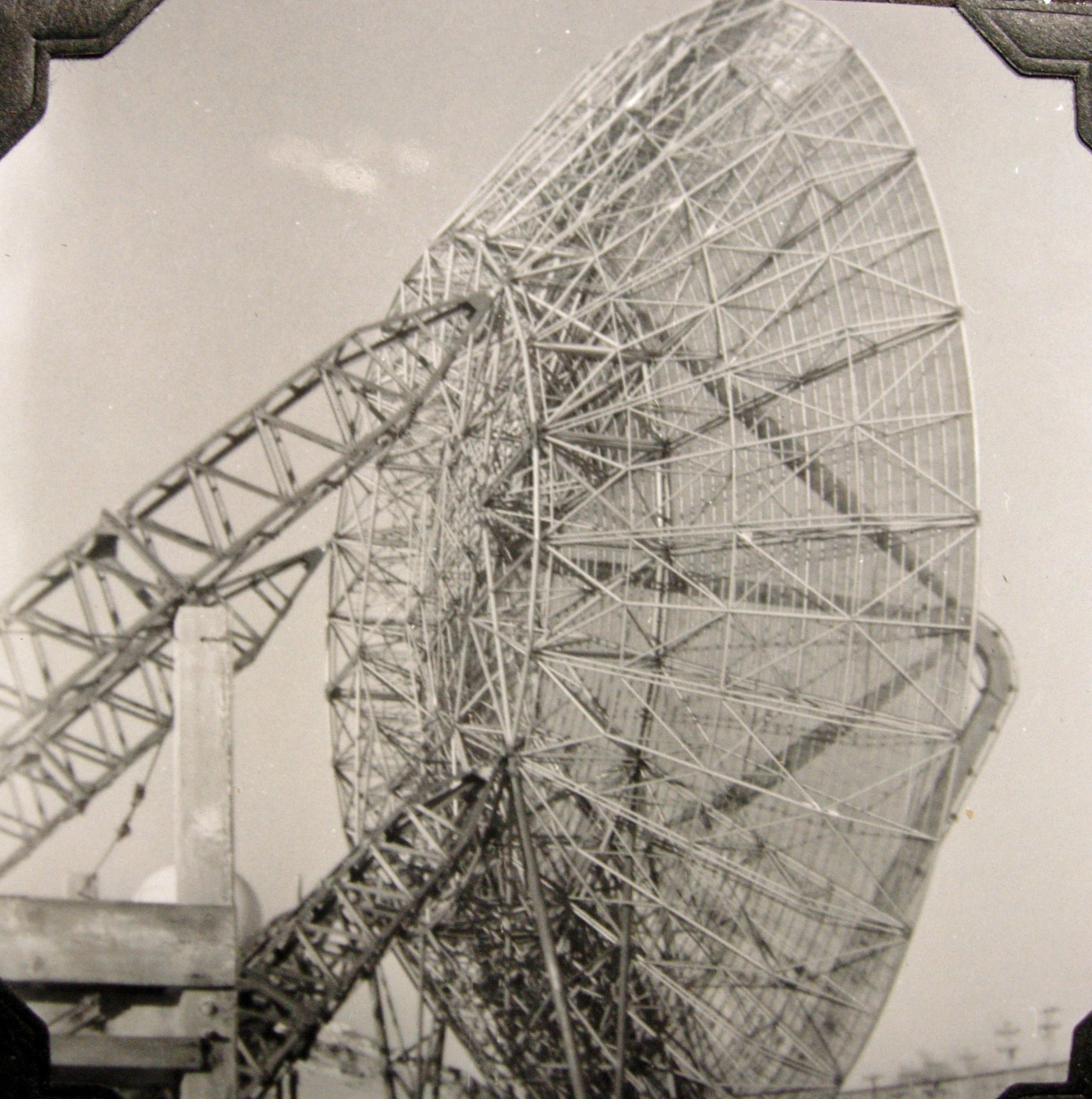
Closeup of one of the 60-foot antennas, showing their mesh construction. On the right (just visible) is the waveguide and feed horn and their tripod support arms.

According to map prepared by the 1876 Radio Relay Squadron, the final layout of the system included nine primary stations. From the north end of the line, these were Frobisher Bay, Resolution Island, CFS Saglek, Hopedale Air Station, CFB Goose Bay, Saint Anthony Air Station, CFB Gander, Pepperrell Air Force Base in St. Johns and Ernest Harmon Air Force Base on the west coast of Newfoundland at Stephenville.

A typical station consisted of two of the 60 foot (18 m) diameter wire-mesh parabolic antennas, one for reception and the other for broadcast. Stations in the middle of the line would have two such setups, one pointed north and the other south. The station at Gander had a third for the link to Harmon. The stations at Harmon, Pepperrell and Frobisher (initially) had only one set, as they were at the ends of the lines. The longest link in this main chain was from Resolution to Saglek, at 228 miles (367 km).

Additionally, there were a number of gap filler radar stations connected to these main sites with shorter-range links using smaller 30 foot (9.1 m) antennas. These were at Cape Makkovik Air Station connecting to Hopedale, Cut Throat Island Air Station and Spotted Island Air Station connected to Cartwright, Fox Harbour Air Station and La Scie Air Station connected to St. Anthony, and Elliston Ridge Air Station and Red Cliff Air Station connected to Pepperrell.

It is unclear whether the links from Frobisher to Thule were considered part of the official Pole Vault system. They do not appear on the 1876 Squadron map of the system in 1959, although they do appear on a map of the "Tropospheric Scatter System" in the same document. A squadron detachment listing from the same document has Detachment 1 in St. Johns and 10 in Frobisher, and 11 through 17 as the gap fillers, with no listings for Cape Dyer or Thule.
