= Pole Vault (disambiguation) =

Pole Vault or Pole vault can refer to:-

- Pole vault, the athletic discipline jumping over high obstacles using a long pole for leverage.
- Pole Vault a code-name for the troposcatter communications network used by the Pinetree Line air defence radars in the northern states of North America.
