= AN/TRC-80 =

Cold War-era US Army communication system

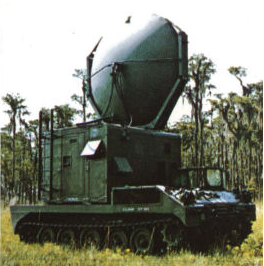
AN/TRC-80 Radio Terminal Set with inflated dish mounted on M474 carrier

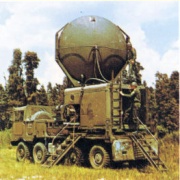
AN/TRC-80 Radio Terminal Set with inflated dish mounted on M656 tractor

The AN/TRC-80 radio terminal set was a United States Army communications system that provided line-of-sight or tropospheric scatter voice and teletypewriter communications between Pershing missile firing units and higher headquarters. Commonly known as the "Track 80", it was built by Collins Radio and first delivered in 1960.

It provided five voice channels and one FSK teletypewriter channel. The voice channels were not secure, but teletypewriter channel could be secured by using the KW-7 electronic teletypewriter security equipment. The frequency range was 4.4–5.0 GHz with a power output of 1 kW.

It used the AS-1270/TRC-80 8-foot parabolic antenna, an inflatable dish antenna that was stored in a recessed space in the roof of the shelter. The 4,800-pound (2,200 kg) TRC-80 shelter was carried on an M474 tracked vehicle with Pershing 1; with Pershing 1a it was carried on the Ford M656 tractor by the U.S. Army and on a 5-ton Magirus-Deutz tractor by the German Air Force.

With the introduction of Pershing II, the TRC-80 was replaced by the AN/TRC-184 radio terminal set and the AN/MSC-6 satellite communication terminal.

In accordance with the Joint Electronics Type Designation System (JETDS), the "AN/TRC-80" designation represents the 80th design of an Army-Navy electronic device for ground transportable two-way communication radio system. The JETDS system also now is used to name all Department of Defense electronic systems.

== See also ==
- List of the United States military vehicles M-numbers
- List of military electronics of the United States
