= Cartwright Air Station =

Former Canadian General Surveillance Radar station

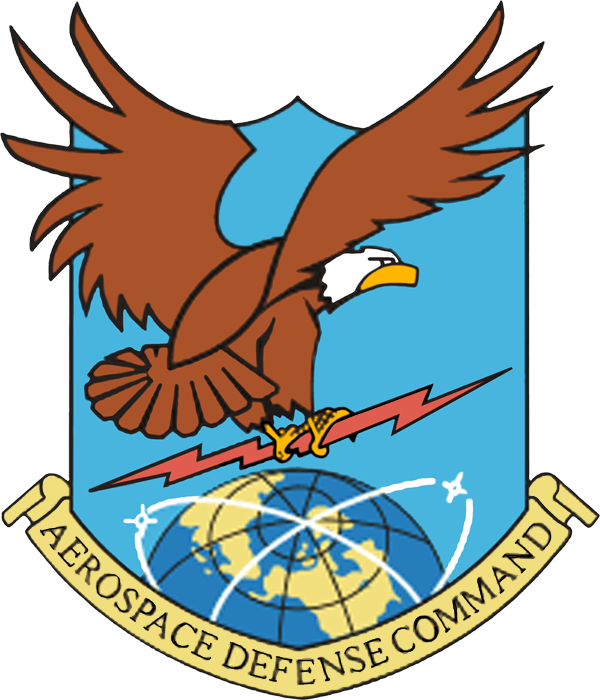
Cartwright Air Station
- Part of Pinetree Line
- Labrador, Canada
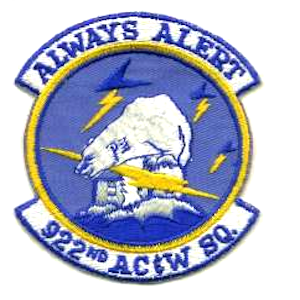
- Emblem of the 922d Aircraft Control and Warning Squadron

Site information
- Type: Radar Station
- Controlled by: Northeast Air Command; Aerospace Defense Command

Location
- Coordinates: 53°43′28″N 056°57′51″W

Site history
- Built: 1953
- Built by: United States Air Force
- In use: 1953-1968

Cartwright Air Station (ADC ID: N-27) is a closed General Surveillance Radar station. It is located 233.7 km (145.2 mi) east-northeast of CFB Goose Bay, Newfoundland and Labrador. It was closed in 1968.

== History ==
The site was established in 1953 as a General Surveillance Radar station, funded by the United States Air Force (USAF). It was used initially by the Northeast Air Command, which stationed the 922d Aircraft Control and Warning Squadron on the station on 1 October 1953. The station functioned as a Ground-Control Intercept (GCI) and warning station. As a GCI station, the squadron's role was to guide interceptor aircraft toward unidentified intruders picked up on the unit's radar scopes.

It was equipped with the following radars:

- Search Radar: AN/FPS-3C, AN/FPS-502, AN/FPS-20A, AN/FPS-87A, AN/FPS-93A
- Height Radar: AN/TPS-502, AN/FPS-6B, AN/FPS-90

The station was reassigned to the USAF Air Defense Command on 1 April 1957, and was given designation "N-27". In 1963, the site was connected to the Manual Data Center at Goose AFB.

In addition to the main facility, Cartwright operated several AN/FPS-14 manned Gap Filler sites:

- Cut Throat Island Air Station (N-27A): 54°29′47″N 057°08′00″W
- Spotted Island Air Station (N-27B): 53°31′05″N 055°44′56″W
- Fox Harbour Air Station (N-27C): 52°22′12″N 055°39′52″W

On 18 June 1968, the USAF transferred control of the site to the Canadian Armed Forces. It was inactivated, closed and the remains of the station are abandoned.

== USAF units and assignments ==
=== Units ===
- 922d Aircraft Control and Warning Squadron, activated at Grenier AFB, New Hampshire, 26 May 1953

Moved to Cartwright Air Station, 1 October 1953
Discontinued,18 June 1968

=== Assignments ===
- 4707th Air Defense Wing (ADC), 26 May 1953
- Northeast Air Command, 1 October 1953
- 4732d Air Defense Group (ADC), 1 April 1957
- Goose Air Defense Sector, 1 April 1960
- 37th Air Division, 1 April 1966 – 18 June 1968

== North Warning System ==
A long range AN/FPS-117 surveillance radar site, Cartwright Long Range Radar Site, was built 21.7 km (13.5 mi) south of Cartwright Air Station in November 1998 as part of the North Warning System to cover any Long Range Radar surveillance gaps. The new site (LAB-6) consists of a radar towers, communications facility, and storage and tunnel connected buildings for personnel.

== See also ==
- United States general surveillance radar stations
