= Saint Anthony Air Station =

Closed Canadian radar station

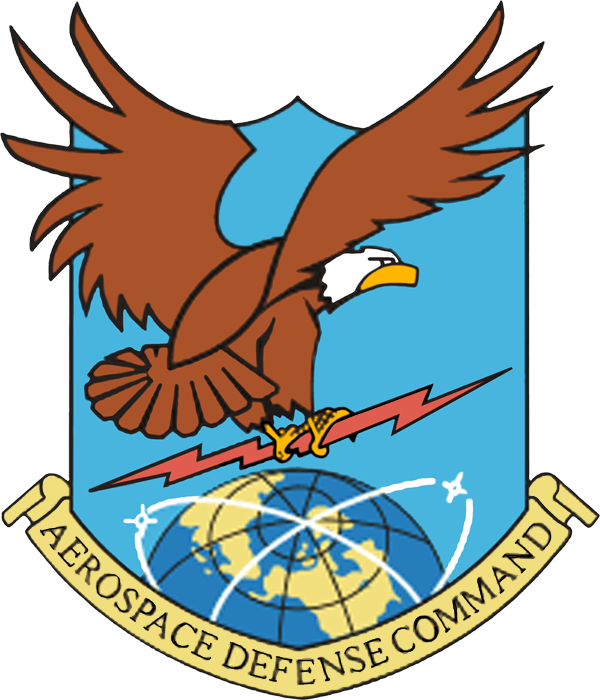
Saint Anthony Air Station
- Part of Pinetree Line
- Newfoundland, Canada
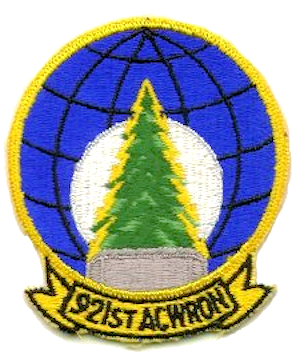
- Emblem of the 921st Aircraft Control and Warning Squadron

Site information
- Type: Radar Station
- Code: N-26
- Controlled by: Northeast Air Command; Aerospace Defense Command

Location
- Coordinates: 51°20′57″N 055°36′39″W

Site history
- Built: 1953
- Built by: United States Air Force
- In use: 1953-1968

Location of Saint Anthony AS

Saint Anthony Air Station (ADC ID: N-26) is a closed General Surveillance Radar station. It is located 292.5 miles (470.7 km) north-northwest of St. John's, Newfoundland and Labrador, Canada. It was closed in 1968.

== History ==
The site was established in 1953 as a General Surveillance Radar station, funded by the United States Air Force, one of the many that would make up the Pinetree Line of Ground-Control Intercept (GCI) radar sites.

It was used initially by the Northeast Air Command 921st Aircraft Control and Warning Squadron, which was activated. It was equipped with the following radars:

- Search Radars: AN/FPS-3C, AN/FPS-502, AN/FPS-20A, AN/FPS-93A
- Height Radars: AN/TPS-502, AN/FPS-6B

As a GCI base, the 921st's role was to guide interceptor aircraft toward unidentified intruders picked up on the unit's radar scopes. These interceptors were assigned to the 64th Air Division at Goose AFB, Labrador.

The station was reassigned to the USAF Air Defense Command on 1 April 1957, and was given designation "N-26". In 1963, the site was connected to the Semi Automatic Ground Environment (SAGE) Direction Center (DC-31) at Goose AFB.

In addition to the main facility, Saint Anthony operated an AN/FPS-14 manned Gap Filler site:

- La Scie Air Station (N-26B): 49°58′50″N 055°31′48″W (Det 2 921st AC&W)

N-26B was built in 1957 about 150 km southeast of the main station and was closed in 1961. The town of La Scie, located about 5 km to the southwest provided living facilities to Detachment 2.

The 921st AC&WS squadron was inactivated on 18 June 1968, and Saint Anthony AS was closed on 30 June. Today the site remains intact. It apparently has been unused and abandoned since its closure, some have been reduced to concrete foundations only.

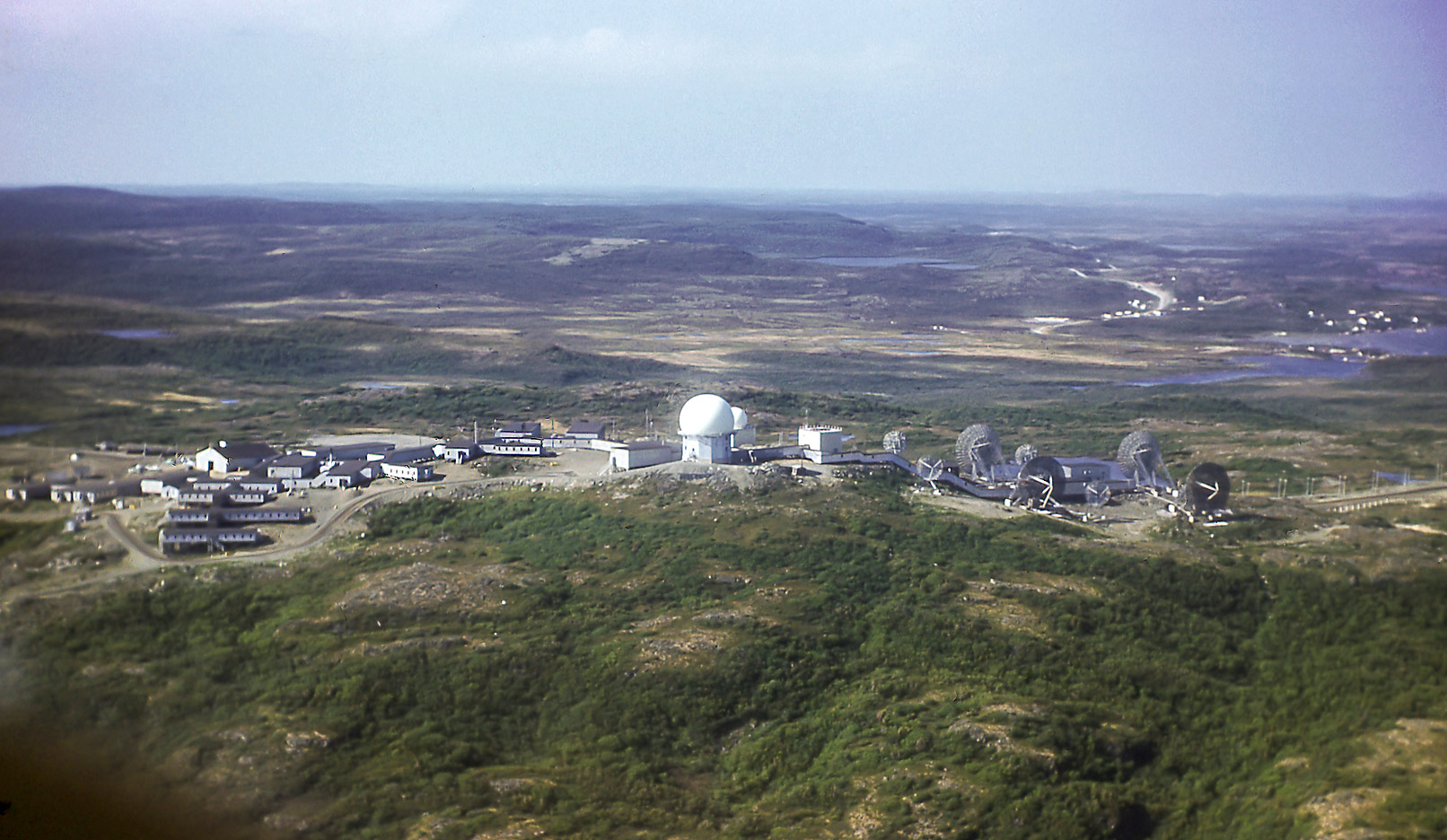
Saint Anthony Air Station, Newfoundland in July 1961

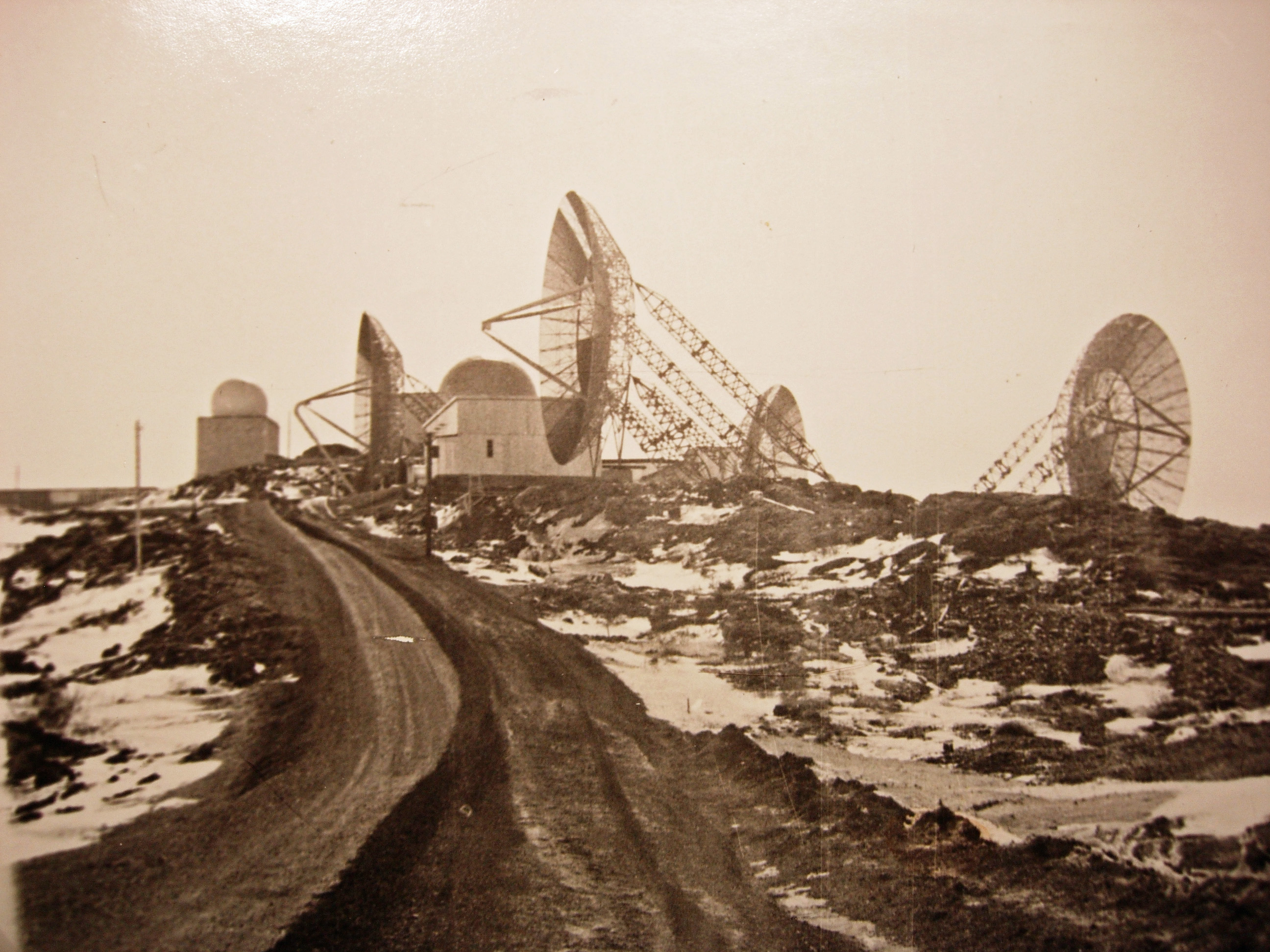
The Pole Vault communications system at Saint Anthony

== USAF units and assignments ==
Units:

- 921st Aircraft Control and Warning Squadron, Activated at Grenier AFB, New Hampshire, 26 May 1953

Transferred to Saint Anthony Air Station, Northeast Air Command, 1 October 1953
Reassigned to Air Defense Command, 1 April 1957
Discontinued 18 June 1968

Assignments:

- 64th Air Division (NEAC), 1 October 1953
- 4731st Air Defense Group, 1 April 1957
- Goose Air Defense Sector, 6 June 1960
- 37th Air Division, 1 April 1966 – 18 June 1968

== See also ==
- List of USAF Aerospace Defense Command General Surveillance Radar Stations
