= TD-2 =

Microwave relay system

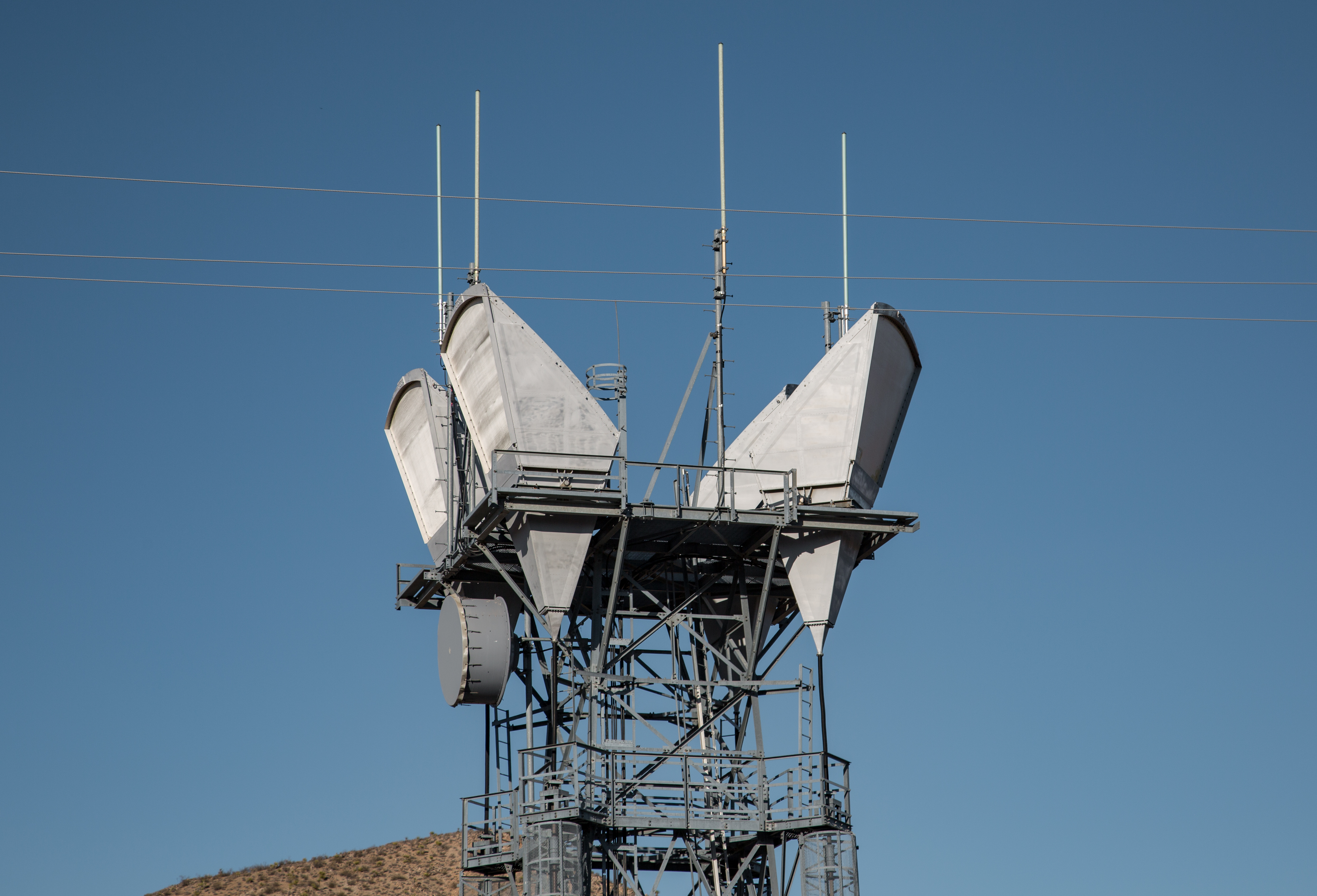
One of the former TD-2 relays in the Mojave National Preserve, California. The tower appears to be in use for other purposes; the vertical antennas at the top and the round dark grey dish are not part of the original system.

TD-2 was a microwave relay system developed by Bell Labs and used by AT&T to build a cross-country network of repeaters for telephone and television transmission. The same system was also used to build the Canadian Trans-Canada Skyway system by Bell Canada, and later, many other companies in many countries to build similar networks for both civilian and military communications.

The system began with the experimental TDX, completed in November 1947, carrying television and telephone between Boston and New York City. TD-2 was a minor improvement on TDX, moving to the 3.7 to 4.2 GHz band set aside in 1947 for common carrier use. The system had six channels, and using frequency-division multiplexing, each channel could carry up to 480 telephone calls or one television signal. The first TD-2 link between New York and Chicago opened on 1 September 1950, followed by a Los Angeles-San Francisco link on 1 September. The two coasts were linked in 1951.

Equipment improvements in 1953 increased capacity to 600 calls per channel. Looking to further improve throughput, Bell Labs introduced the TH system, which operated in a higher band, around 6 GHz. It also added polarization to the signals allowing two channels per band, vertical and horizontal. This allowed it to carry 1,200 calls per channel, but required the use of horn antennas to retain polarization. After considerable research, Bell developed an antenna that worked for both TD-2 and TH, but these improvements also helped TD-2 and increased its capacity to 900 calls, delaying a widespread rollout of TH which was added only to the busiest links.

By the late 1960s, almost all of the population of North America was linked using TD-2 and TH. Television signals moved to satellite distribution in the 1970s and 80s, and the network was mostly used for telephone from that time. During the late 1980s and especially 1990s, the installation of fiber optic lines replaced the microwave networks. Some of the towers are in use today for other purposes, but the majority of the sites are abandoned.

== History ==
=== High-frequency experiments ===
Radio telephone systems had been experimented with as early as 1915, the year after AT&T bought Lee de Forest's patents on the audion vacuum tube. Experiments were carried out between Arlington, Virginia, Hawaii and Paris. After being interrupted by World War I, such experiments began again and led to the creation of a permanent link between New York City and London in 1927. This system operated at 60 kHz, using the behavior of lower-frequency radio waves to follow the curvature of the Earth to provide over-the-horizon performance.

Around the same time, the first experiments with megahertz frequency radios were showing the ability to use ionospheric scatter to provide long-distance radio propagation at these higher frequencies. A new link between New York and London started in 1928, and was quickly followed by other users around the world. The main problem with this system is that the scattering meant the ultimate range of the signals could not be predicted, which made it difficult to ensure that any two stations could use the same frequencies and be safe from interference. Research continued on moving to ever-higher frequencies in an effort to avoid interference as well as expand bandwidth.

A single-line link between Boston and Cape Cod was set up in 1934 at 60 MHz, moving to what was then relatively unused spectrum. A more advanced system was set up across the entrance of Chesapeake Bay in 1941, operating at 150 MHz. This system had enough bandwidth to allow 12 telephone calls to be sent on the single connection using the same multiplexing system used on long-distance calling wires.

It was already clear that moving to the gigahertz range would offer far more bandwidth and allow hundreds of calls on a single link. Bell went so far as to show illustrations of what such a system might look like, the illustration using long horn antennas. The opening of World War II ended these experiments.

=== First microwave systems ===
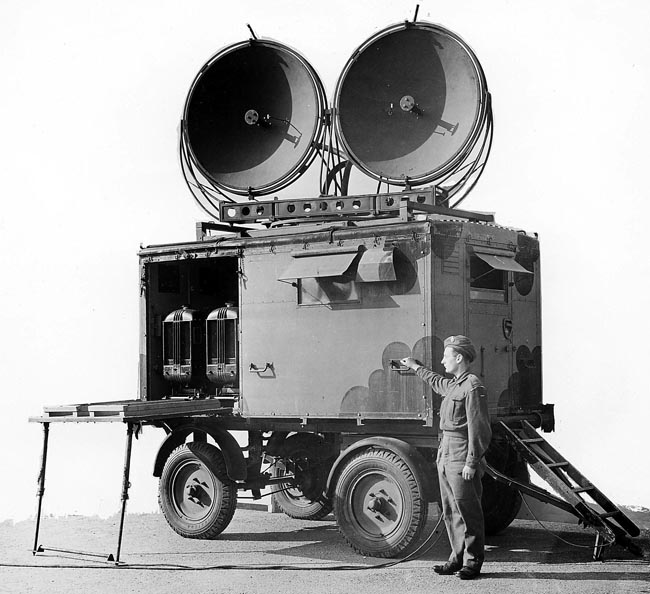
The British Army's WS No. 10 sparked off post-war interest in microwave communications.

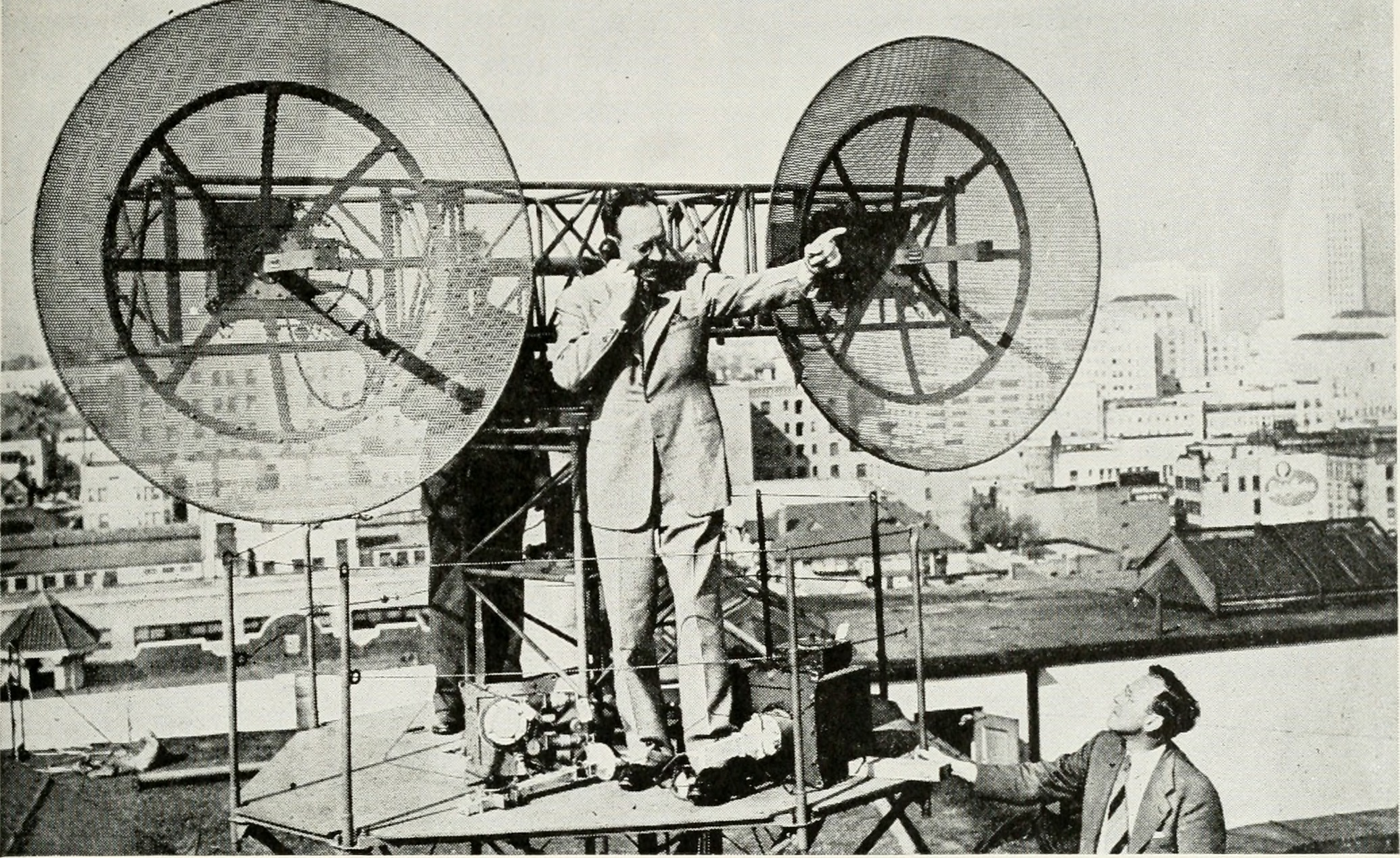
In 1946, Bell linked Catalina Island with Los Angeles using a small microwave relay system. The parabolic reflectors are taken from the SCR-584 radar.

The development of the cavity magnetron and improvements in the power of klystrons along with the associated waveguides, crystal detectors, and microwave switches as part of radar development provided all of the equipment needed to move radiotelephony into the microwave region. In the UK, these technologies were used to produce the world's first microwave relay telephone system: Wireless Set No. 10 (WS.10), which multiplexed eight telephone calls into a single microwave link that could be used to the limit of the line of sight. This was used during the Second World War's Normandy landings: in the field to communicate with forward units, and on either side of the English Channel to provide a link back to headquarters in the UK.

Bell did carry on some continued work with telephony during the war, experimenting with systems working at 3, 4.6 and 9.5 GHz over a 40 miles (64 km) line between New York and Neshanic, New Jersey. A shorter link was also tested at 0.7 and 24 GHz. In April 1944, the company announced their plans to use this technology to build an intercity telephony system. In December, a new special project group was set up as the war was clearly winding down and a return to civilian work was approaching. This led to a microwave relay group being set up in the Research Department under the direction of Gordon Thayer.

On 13 March 1944, AT&T announced they would be installing 7,000 miles (11,000 km) of coaxial cable to carry telephone and television signals, and then extended that in 1950 to 12,000 miles (19,000 km). However, engineering studies demonstrated that a microwave relay would cost less to install for the same network, although there were some questions about the ongoing operational costs. Given concerns about the company's ability to raise capital, the microwave system was seen as a more attractive choice. Continued experiments through this period demonstrated that interference from rain was significant above 10 GHz, while operation below 1 GHz was difficult as the required antenna sizes were too large to be practical.

One problem for the project was that AT&T was not the only one with big post-war plans for radio spectrum; during the war television production was cancelled and those companies were expecting a huge post-war buying spree. During early testing, UHF signals would sometimes be detected at very long ranges that theory suggested was impossible. This led to the discovery of tropospheric scatter, which would become another important long-range telephony system in the future. It also led to the "television freeze" of 1948, as the FCC attempted to understand the problem and come up with solutions. As this would almost invariably mean a reallocation of frequencies, AT&T was also frozen in their relay efforts while they waited to learn which frequencies they might get to use.

=== TDX ===
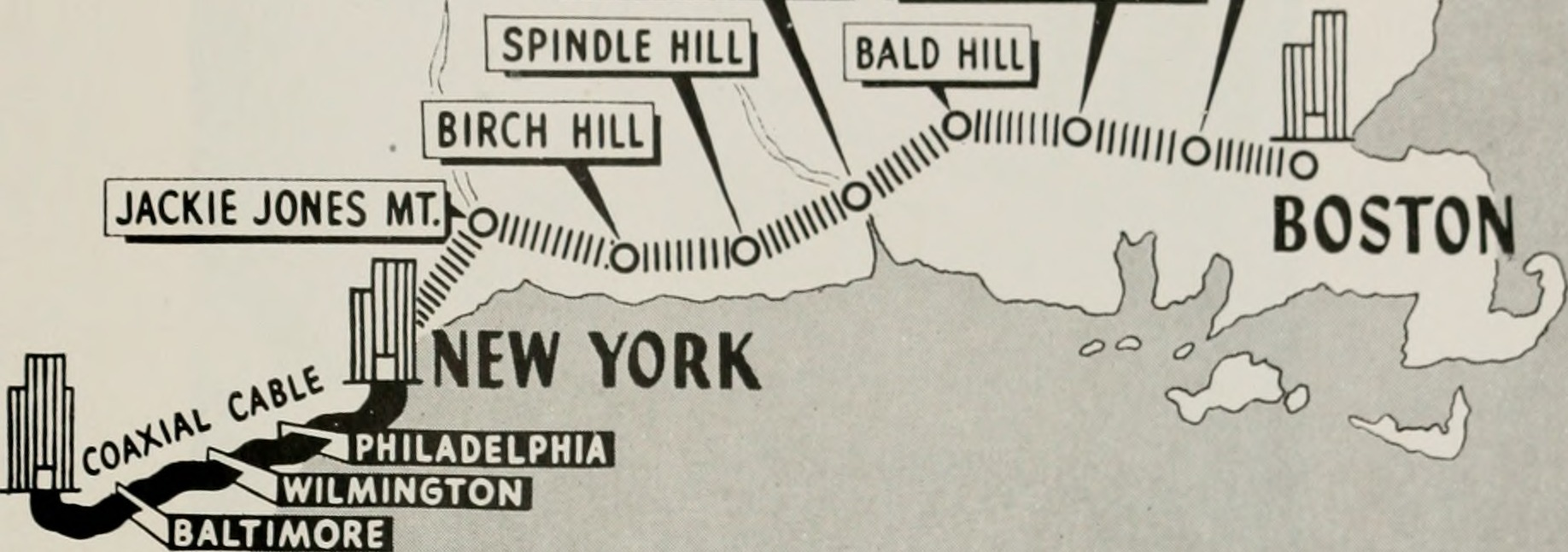
The TDX system linked New York with Boston through a series of several repeater stations.

While they waited the outcome of the FCC's efforts, Bell decided to install an experimental system as a prototype of what they believed would be the commercial system. This was built as the TDX line between New York and Boston. The FCC granted them an allocation between 3.9 and 4.4 GHz in May 1945. The system had four channels of 10 MHz each spaced over the allocation, and the signals were encoded into the channels using frequency modulation. The network used seven repeaters along the link.

The system was completed in November 1947 and experimental television transmissions began on the 13th. The signals were transmitted from Boston to New York and then on to Washington, D.C., on an existing coax link. The link remained free for use until May 1948, at which point it was offered as a commercial service. The TDX link remained in place until 1958.

=== TD-2 ===
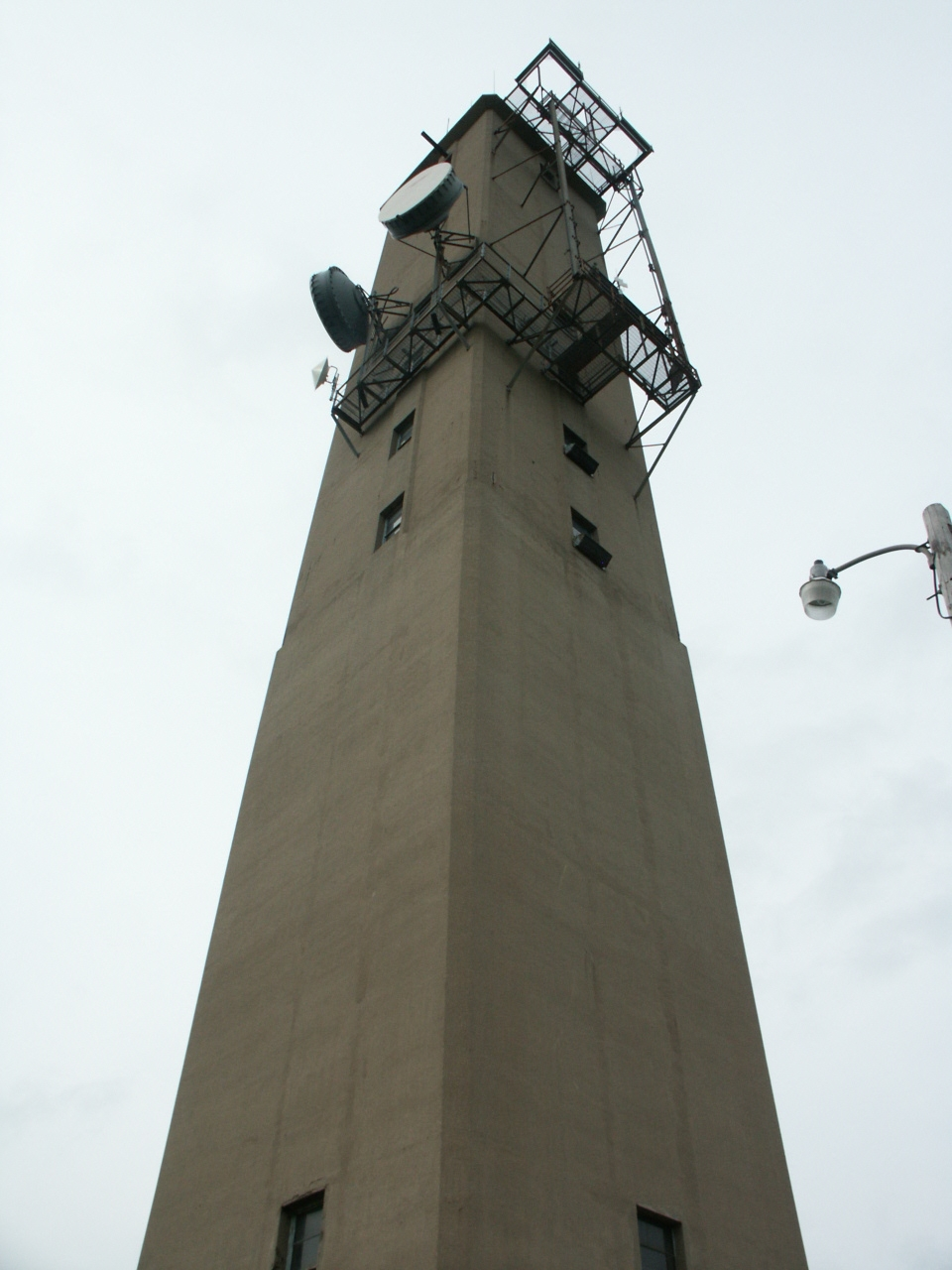
Early stations, like this one near Valparaiso, Indiana, were built of concrete. They housed the electronics mid-way up the tower, behind the window-like openings, to avoid line losses. These were replaced by the steel framework towers as the cost of steel dropped through the 1950s.

As the television spectrum was being bought up, AT&T faced increasing pressure to give up its existing VHF allocations for new television channels. This would only be possible if the FCC opened new frequencies for them to use for telephony. As early as 1946 the FCC was already concerned about potential crowding in the GHz range and began to consider its formal allocation as well. In 1947, a meeting of the International Telecommunication Union was called to allocate the spectrum, which was ratified by the FCC in the summer of 1948. This set aside three bands for common carrier use, 3.7 to 4.2, 5.925 to 6.425 and 10.7 to 11.7 GHz.

So while TDX was still at the stage of only being a breadboard model, the decision was made to move ahead with a production system at the newer and slightly lower frequencies. In October 1946, the New York to Chicago route was selected as the basis for a nationwide network. A planning team outlined two plans, one would be completed in June 1949 and the other in June 1950, different mostly in that the former, known as TD1, would use the existing TDX equipment while the later, TD-2, would use improved equipment with six channels instead of four and new receivers that would allow greater distances between the stations.

AT&T filed an application with the FCC in January 1947 to build the link. Management demanded that they use the more advanced TD-2 system but meet the original 1949 date, as television stations were clamoring for new links. Engineering accepted the goal and said it could be met if everything went right. Their initial plan was to develop the radio, antenna and power plant designs by the end of 1947 and all the other pieces by early 1948. Western Electric would gear up production lines so deliveries could start in late 1948 and be completed in six months. Meanwhile, AT&T Long Lines would survey and purchase the repeater sites and build the associated buildings and towers.

Management was initially concerned with television signals, but as time went on, telephone signals grew in importance. This led to the decision to delay service until the fall of 1950, allowing for multiplexer systems to be installed that would allow 480 calls per channel. At the same time, plans were made for a second line between Los Angeles and San Francisco. The equipment on the Chicago route was installed by the spring of 1950. These early systems were built in tall concrete towers that allowed the radio equipment to be mounted in the tower to keep it as close to the antennas as possible and thus avoid losses in the transmission lines.

Tests began in June, initially with little success and problems with noise continued to plague the system into July. Things were finally improving by August, at which time an experiment sent a signal from New York to Chicago, back to New York and then again to Chicago. The total length of transmission was the same as New York to San Francisco, and the degradation of the signal was "barely perceptible" even on an oscilloscope.

The New York-Chicago line was opened for service on 1 September 1950, and the Los Angeles-San Francisco link on the 15th. The two sections were linked in time for it to broadcast Harry S. Truman's opening address at the Treaty of San Francisco on 4 September 1951 across the nation.

=== Continued development ===
Over the next years, AT&T and Bell Labs continually worked on the system to improve it. Among the most important improvements were those on the lifetime of the tubes. The primary concern was the main transmitter, the 416A, which was raised from about 2000 hours when it entered service to about 6 to 8000 hours by 1952, and 20,000 hours by 1967. Likewise, problems with the 417A used in the intermediate frequency pre-amplifier were successfully addressed, raising its useful life from as little as 100 hours to 10,000. Another important improvement was a rapid switching system that allowed any channel to be switched to a stand-by channel without dropping the signal. One channel was normally left open for this purpose, with the other five being actively used.

Another significant issue with the TD-2 system was that only half of the available bandwidth could be used, as microwave frequency filters of the era were not particularly narrow so the channels had to be spaced out significantly. This also limited the angles at which the antennas could be pointed; any two signals closer than 60 degrees would begin to interfere. In 1951, the development of slot filters using ferrite cores solved this issue and would allow almost double the number of channels and allow the antennas to be pointed to within 9 degrees, meaning a single tower could service two closely spaced endpoints.

=== TH ===
In 1955, Bell Labs had begun work on a new relay system known as TH, which operated in the 6 GHz band. A significant feature of TH was that it used polarization to separate the signals, allowing the channels to operate very close to each other in frequency and thereby make much better use of the bandwidth. Combined with wider bands and new encoding, TH could carry 1,200 calls per channel, and have double the number of channels.

In theory, because they operated on different bands, TH systems could be added to existing TD-2 sites to increase the station's capacity. Unfortunately, the TD-2 antennas could not be used with polarized signals, and TH planned to use horn antennas which preserved polarization. That led to the consideration of whether TD-2 could also move to a horn design, and whether a single horn could work at both frequencies. To do this, the waveguide would have to be circular as far as the point where the TH signal would be tapped off, and large enough to carry the 3.7 GHz TD-2 as opposed to the shorter 6 GHz TH signals. Extensive research and testing was required to answer the question, but eventually, a suitable antenna design was produced.

TD-2 stations after 1955 used the new horn design. At the same time, this allowed the existing TD-2 stations to be upgraded to also use polarized signals, and new multiplexer designs emerged, which in combination allowed up to 600 calls per channel. This over doubled the capacity of the original links. Thus, the design effort that considered whether TH could take over existing TD-2 sites instead delayed the widespread use of TH as the capacity of the existing TD-2 systems improved. TH rollout did not begin until 1961, and by the mid-1960s, the majority of the network still used TD-2.

In April 1962, it was decided to re-engineer the TD-2 system as TD3. This was a solid state system with the only remaining tube being the microwave transmitter, which moved from a klystron to a lower noise travelling-wave tube. The receiver had far less noise, through the use of Schottky barrier diodes and tunnel diodes, allowing the number of telephone calls per channel to be increased once again to 1,200. To reach these levels, there needed to be improvements to the physical plant and antennas as well. Taking advantage of just these changes resulted in the TD-2A, which could carry 900 telephone calls per channel, which could be rapidly deployed while waiting for TD3 to arrive.

By 1968, 40% of all the long-distance traffic in the U.S. was being carried by TD-2. It also carried 95% of the country's inter-city television signals.

=== Closure ===
Two events in 1970 led to the ending of AT&T's microwave expansion and its eventual demise.

The first geostationary communications satellites were launched in the 1960s, but widespread commercial service did not start until the 1970s. Satellites quickly took over the distribution of television signals as these generally started at a single transmitter site, the network's main studios, and were broadcast to many receivers, at the local television stations. This could be easily accomplished by a single satellite and relatively inexpensive receivers at the local stations. As television moved off the microwave systems, the freed channels were turned over to use for telephone, or the early 1970s emerging market for dedicated data lines.

The replacement of its use for telephone was also taking place during the 1970s. At Corning Glass, a team led by Robert Maurer developed a new method of making optical fiber that had much higher quality and lower loss than previous designs. At almost the same time, Bell Labs developed the first room-temperature semiconductor laser. This could be switched on and off at very high speed, allowing it to create pulse-code modulation (PCM) signals within a fiber. In 1976, AT&T installed its first experimental fiber system, a 2,000-foot (610 m) run under the streets of Atlanta, and many similar projects emerged around the world.

In 1976, Masaru Horiguchi of NTT introduced a new optical fiber that was optically clear at 1.3 micrometers. That same year, J. Jim Hsieh of the Lincoln Laboratory introduced a solid-state laser operating at this frequency. In 1979, AT&T built a network using this technology in Lake Placid, New York, to carry the television signals of the 1980 Winter Olympics. By the early 1980s, long-distance fibers were rapidly replacing all other technologies.

AT&T continued using its microwave network for telephone service through this period, but Sprint's 1980s all-fiber, all-digital network forced the company to switch to digital as well, using new fiber rather than updating the microwave system. By the late 1990s, most of the microwave network had been turned off. In 1999, AT&T sold off the towers to any buyers. Most towers went unpurchased and now stand derelict.

=== Re-emergence ===
Some activities are extremely sensitive to end-to-end delays (latency) in long-distance communication—most notably financial high-frequency trading—which has created a new market for microwave links.

Signals travel around two-thirds the speed in fiber than through the air, about 200,000 km/s instead of 299,700 km/s. Of even greater impact is that for cost reasons, fiber network paths generally follow existing infrastructure rights-of-way like railways and tunnels rather than the relatively straight point-to-point connections of the microwave system. Finally, in multi-leg microwave runs, packets are not routed at each tower; they are simply forwarded, further decreasing latency compared to fiber.

Because of this, by the 2010s a small number of former TD-2 towers were brought back to use under third-party ownership, including those originally used to connect New York and Chicago, two major financial centers. For this link, third-party analysis in 2011 showed an average overall drop in latency of 2.5 milliseconds in trades, corresponding to the opening of the first re-established microwave link. By 2013, 15 such links were in operation between the two cities, and similar networks have been started between London and Frankfurt, among other routes. Although these do not use the original network equipment, and generally do not use the TD-2 antennas either, the towers are ideally sited for use with new equipment.

== See also ==
- AT&T Long Lines
