= Project Offices =

Internal name used by the AT&T corporation for private company projects

Project Offices is the name sometimes used to refer to several structurally dependable facilities maintained by the AT&T Corporation on the East Coast of the United States since the middle 20th century to house ongoing, non-public, company projects.

== History and purpose ==
AT&T began constructing Project Offices in the 1960s. Since the inception of the Project Offices program, the company has chosen not to disclose the exact nature of business conducted at Project Offices, describing them only as "central facilities". According to an article in The Charlotte Observer, the sites were intended as nuclear bunkers for government and military officials.

== Sites ==
The locations of several Project Offices have been described in media reports.

=== Big Hole ===
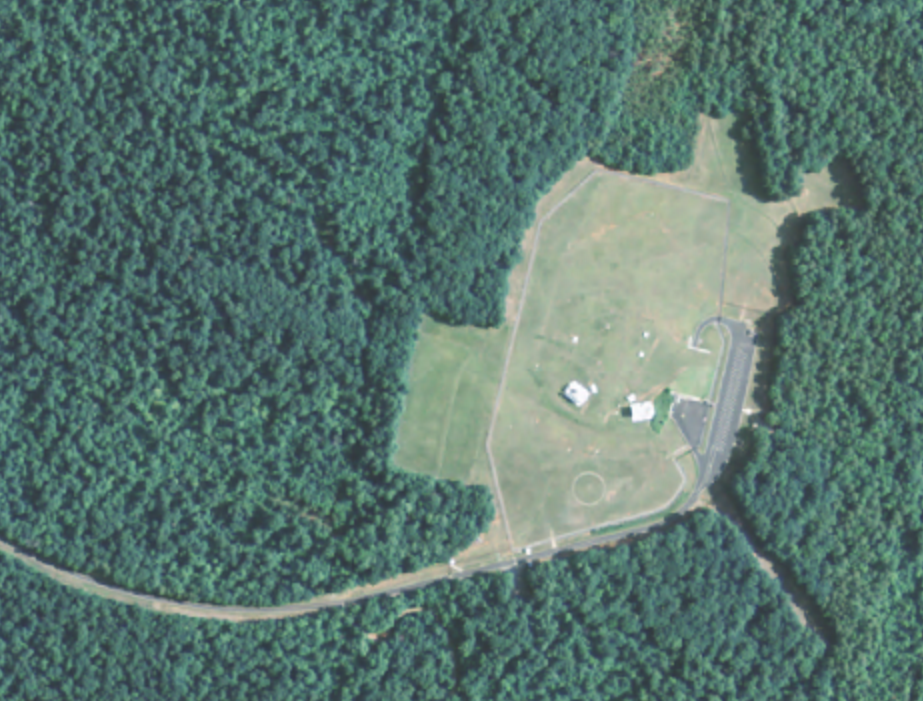
A U.S. Geological Survey satellite image shows the site of the "Big Hole" Project Office including its two above ground tropospheric scatter antennas.

A Project Office located in Chatham County, North Carolina, colloquially known as "Big Hole", came online in the mid-1960s and was described by area residents and persons employed in the construction of the site as being "department-store sized" with walls "several feet thick" covered in copper, buried 30 feet (9.1 m) underground on large shock-absorbing springs, constructed with plumbing made out of rubber, and outfitted with tropospheric scatter antennas. The Big Hole Project Office was located on 191 acres of company-owned land surrounded with fencing, CCTV cameras, and steel crash barriers. According to observers of the Project Offices program, the physical description of Big Hole is consistent with the design of other known Project Offices. (35°46′58″N 79°4′27″W)

Big Hole may have been shuttered in 2008; media noted at the time that several convoys of trucks appeared to have moved large amounts of equipment out of the site over the course of several weeks and a company guard force had been withdrawn.

=== Peters Mountain ===
A Project Office is located at, or inside, Peters Mountain in Charlottesville, Virginia. According to Albemarle County building permits issued to AT&T between 2007 and 2014 (permits B200701545AC, B201302542ATWR, and B201402314AC), the site underwent $61.1 million of interior and exterior alterations. (38°7′33″N 78°17′10″W)

=== Short Hill Mountain ===
A Project Office, AT&T Underground Facility, is located on the eastern slope of Short Hill Mountain in Virginia. This facility was originally constructed in the 1960s and involved excavation of a large section of the mountain. In 2016 AT&T announced plans to expand the site, what it referred to in zoning documents as "Project Aurelia", by adding a "structure described to be as large as a Costco store with eight super generators and a huge water storage tank at the site". The corporation "abruptly abandoned" Project Aurelia after local government officials proposed a public hearing on the construction to address environmental concerns. (39°16′0″N 77°42′26″W)

=== Hagerstown Facility ===
Located northwest of Hagerstown, Maryland, in the Bear Pond Mountains, sits an AT&T Project Office, named the HAG2 Site. This facility went online in 1963 and was primarily tasked with serving in AT&T's Long Lines Project Offices Program. The HAG2 Site is equipped with tropospheric scatter antennas on top of a hardened nuclear bunker which housed the communications equipment. Due to the heavy presence of Continuity of Government facilities, including Site C and Raven Rock, HAG2 served as an auxiliary link between Raven Rock (AJCC) in Pennsylvania to Fort Bragg, North Carolina. In addition to serving as an auxiliary relay station, HAG2 was the northernmost station that connected to the Long Lines in the Northern United States. As of 2007, the site has undergone upgrades and is still owned by AT&T, however the tropospheric scatter antennas are no longer used.

== Urban legends ==
Due to the private nature of Project Office business activities, wild claims and urban legends have sometimes accompanied description of the sites. Some residents near the Peters Mountain Project Office have claimed that "anti-aircraft artillery" was moved to the mountaintop in 2001. Residents near Short Hill Mountain claim the mountaintop is illuminated in blue lights at nighttime. Big Hole, meanwhile, has generated claims of aberrant lightning activity being witnessed over the site.

== See also ==
- 33 Thomas Street
- FAIRVIEW
