= Cut Throat Island Air Station =

Former US Air Force radar station in Canada

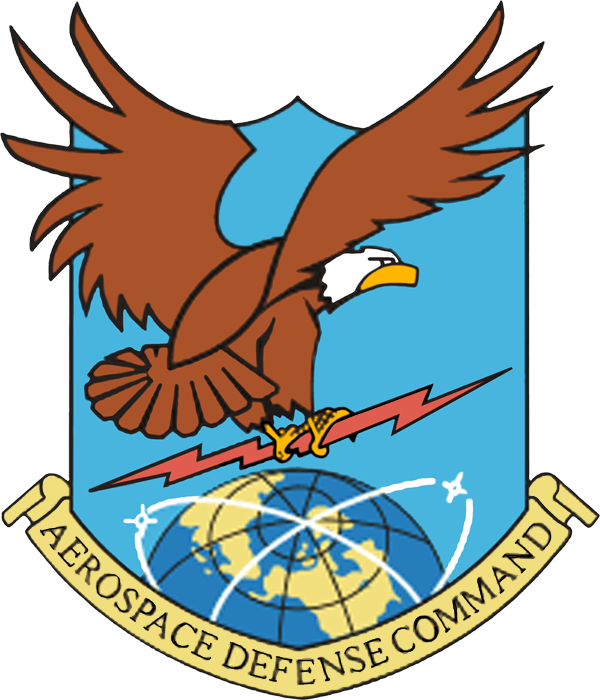
Cut Throat Island Air Station
- Part of Pinetree Line
- Labrador, Canada
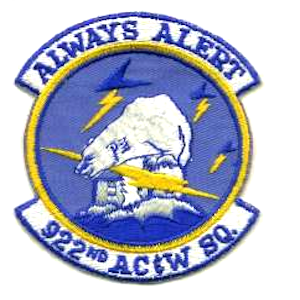
- Emblem of the 922d Aircraft Control and Warning Squadron

Site information
- Type: Radar Station
- Controlled by: Aerospace Defense Command

Location
- Coordinates: 54°29′47″N 057°08′00″W

Site history
- Built: 1957
- Built by: United States Air Force
- In use: 1957-1961

Location of Cut Throat Island Air Station, Labrador

Cut Throat Island Air Station (ADC ID: N-27A) was a General Surveillance Gap Filler Radar station in the Canadian province of Newfoundland and Labrador, It was located 160 miles (260 km) east-northeast of CFB Goose Bay. It was closed in 1961.

== History ==
The site was established in 1957 as a staffed Gap Filler radar station, built by the United States Air Force, under operational control of Cartwright Air Station and part of the Pinetree Line of Ground-Control Intercept (GCI) radar sites.

The station was assigned to Aerospace Defense Command in 1957, and was given designation "N-27A". Aerospace Defense Command stationed the 922d Aircraft Control and Warning Squadron at the station in 1957. It operated an AN/FPS-14 staffed Gap Filler search radar.

== USAF units and assignments ==
Units:

- 922d Aircraft Control and Warning Squadron, Activated at Grenier AFB, New Hampshire 26 May 1953

Moved to Cartwright Air Station, 1 October 1953
Discontinued 1961

Assignments:

- 4732d Air Defense Group (ADC), 1 April 1957
- Goose Air Defense Sector, 1 April 1960

== See also ==
- List of USAF Aerospace Defense Command General Surveillance Radar Stations

== Bibliography ==
- A Handbook of Aerospace Defense Organization 1946 - 1980, by Lloyd H. Cornett and Mildred W. Johnson, Office of History, Aerospace Defense Center, Peterson Air Force Base, Colorado
- Winkler, David F. (1997), Searching the skies: the legacy of the United States Cold War defense radar program. Prepared for United States Air Force Headquarters Air Combat Command.
