= Spotted Island Air Station =

General Surveillance Gap Filler Radar station

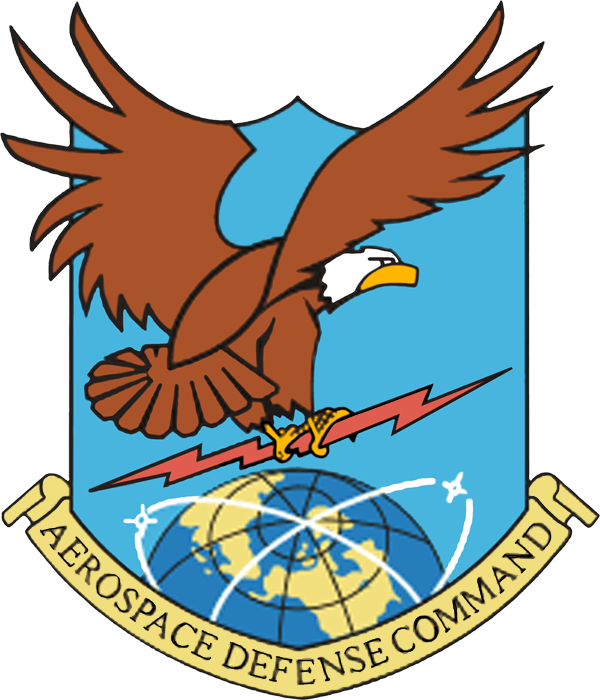
Spotted Island Air Station
- Part of Pinetree Line
- Labrador, Canada
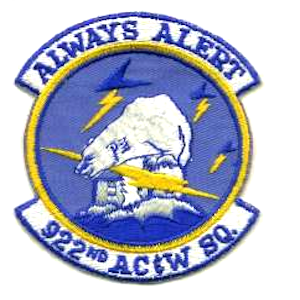
- Emblem of the 922d Aircraft Control and Warning Squadron

Site information
- Type: Radar Station
- Code: N-27B
- Controlled by: Aerospace Defense Command

Location
- Coordinates: 53°31′05″N 055°44′56″W

Site history
- Built: 1957
- Built by: United States Air Force
- In use: 1957-1961

Location of Spotted Island Air Station, Labrador

Spotted Island Air Station (ADC ID: N-27B) was a General Surveillance Gap Filler Radar station in the Canadian province of Newfoundland and Labrador, It was located 195 miles (314 km) east of CFB Goose Bay. It was closed in 1961.

== History ==
The site was established in 1957 as a staffed Gap Filler radar station, built by the United States Air Force, under operational control of Cartwright Air Station and part of the Pinetree Line of Ground-Control Intercept (GCI) radar sites.

The station was assigned to Aerospace Defense Command in 1957, and was given designation "N-27B". Aerospace Defense Command stationed the 922d Aircraft Control and Warning Squadron at the station in 1957. It operated an AN/FPS-14 staffed Gap Filler search radar.

== USAF units and assignments ==
Units:

- 922d Aircraft Control and Warning Squadron, Activated at Grenier AFB, New Hampshire 26 May 1953

Moved to Cartwright Air Station, 1 October 1953
Discontinued 1961

Assignments:

- 4732d Air Defense Group (ADC), 1 April 1957
- Goose Air Defense Sector, 1 April 1960

== See also ==
- List of USAF Aerospace Defense Command General Surveillance Radar Stations
