= Wireless Set Number 10 =

World's first microwave relay telephone system

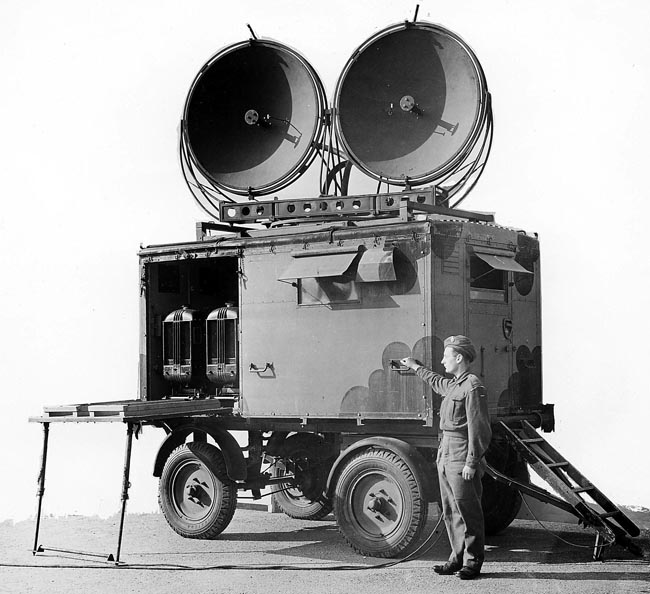
Wireless Set No. 10. The panel on the left covers the generators during transit and was opened during operation. The two identical generators suggest this is a Mark I model, as the Mark II had two different generators.

The British Army's Wireless Set, Number 10, was the world's first multi-channel microwave relay telephone system. It transmitted eight full-duplex (two-way) telephone channels between two stations limited only by the line-of-sight, often on the order of 25 to 50 miles (40 to 80 km). The stations were mounted in highly mobile trailers and were set up simply by aiming the two parabolic antennas on the roof at the next station. The system could be extended into a relay by connecting trailers together, or using existing landlines to connect separated trailers.

The basic concept became possible with the introduction of two key technologies in 1940: the cavity magnetron, which produced microwave signals with reasonable efficiency; and pulse-width modulation (PWM), which offered a simple way to encode the signals on a magnetron. As the available bandwidth was high, eight channels were combined into a single link using time-division multiplexing.

Early experiments with single-duplex (one-way) systems were carried out in 1941 and 1942 which demonstrated the basic concept. By that point, improvements in electronics allowed for a full-duplex system. Testing of a long-range system began in 1942 and overwater tests followed. The system was ready for service in 1944, and military-quality sets were available for D-Day operations. The range was enough that it was used to provide secure communications from the D-Day beaches back to England across the English Channel, and the network was eventually extended into Germany. Field Marshal Bernard Montgomery would later note:

By using a chain of No. 10 Set Stations, I was able to maintain my tactical HQ as far forward as I did and still have contact with London. The value of being able to retain personal contact over my Armies in these circumstances cannot be overestimated.

== Description ==
=== Radiotelephony ===
There had been many systems for transmitting telephone conversations over radio before World War II, but they all suffered from a series of similar problems.

The first was that in order to gain long-range transmission, these systems had to work at relatively low frequencies in the kilohertz range or somewhat higher longwave frequencies that could take advantage of the ionosphere to "skip" their signals. A radio antenna has to be within about an order of magnitude of the wavelength in order to be efficient, and in practice, is often sized to exactly 1/2 the wavelength to form a half-wave dipole. Thus, these systems used very large antennas.

Another related radio physics effect is the directivity of the antenna, its ability to form the signal into a beam. This is related to optical resolution, which is improved with increasing antenna sizes, and decreased with increasing wavelength. The relatively long wavelengths of the signals made focussing difficult without resorting to enormous antenna arrays, and in many cases such signals were broadcast omni- or semi-directionally instead. This meant the signals could be received by ground stations other than the intended one, sometimes thousands of miles away, leading to interference. For secure military communications, such a system had obvious drawbacks.

Finally, the amount of information that can be carried by a radio signal is a function of its bandwidth. A telephone conversation might make do with a bandwidth as small as 4 kHz, but if this is send using a 150 kHz carrier signal, this represents a fairly large fractional bandwidth. Depending on the antenna and receiver design, the spread of frequencies that can be efficiently received may limit the link to one or two conversations.

All of these problems are reduced by moving to shorter wavelengths. There was considerable experimentation in the immediate pre-war era with newer vacuum tubes that could operate in the very-high frequency (VHF) band. AT&T led a number of these efforts, including a system operating at 150 MHz. This allowed the signal to be more tightly focused, and the increased bandwidth allowed a dozen lines to be carried on the signal using the same equipment used to multiplex calls into the existing landline network. Even at this early time, Bell Labs noted that the system would be much more effective in centimetre wavelengths, and produced an illustration of a system using horn antennas that could carry hundreds of calls. Further experiments were curtailed by the start of the war.

Higher frequency systems had been experimented with, but were significantly limited by the low power of the microwave tubes of the era. An experimental 1931 system across the English Channel produced only 0.5 W of output, and was not used commercially. A commercial system followed in 1935, but while the 300 MHz frequency were considered microwaves at the time, today these would be known as UHF. Several similar experiments were also carried out in Germany, primarily by Telefunken, but they were stymied by low power levels and their multi-channel system was never successfully developed. By the end of World War II they had built out a network, eventually reaching 70,000 kilometres (43,000 mi), using single-channel links and very tall antennas.

=== Microwave development ===
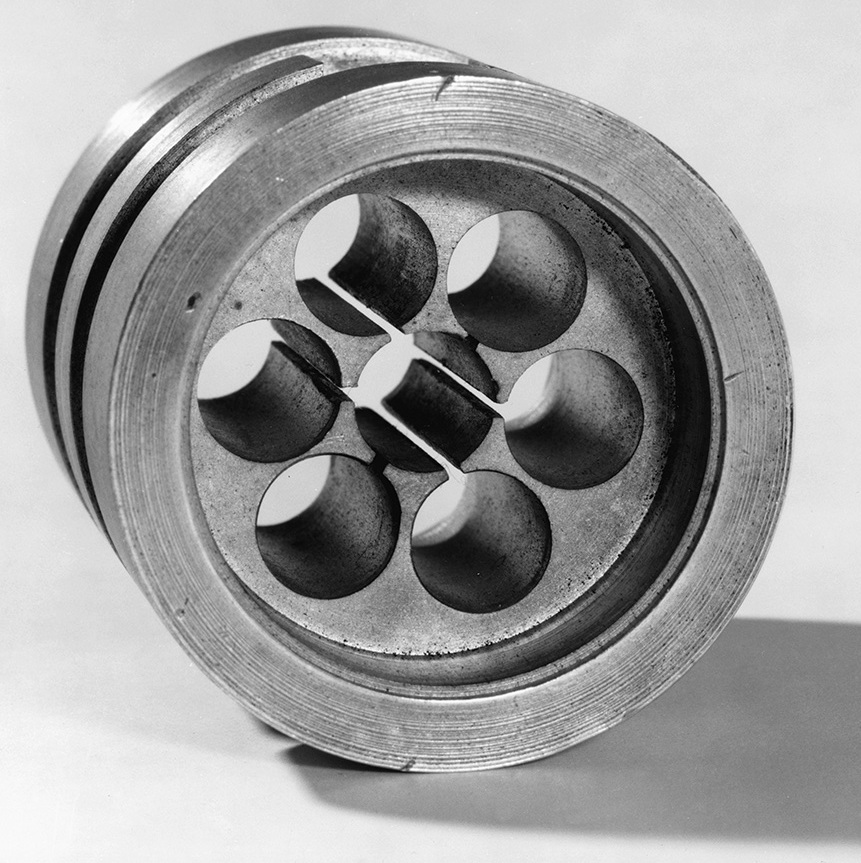
When a voltage is applied, electrons under the influence of a strong transverse magnetic field move from the cathode (not shown) to the anode and circulate past the openings in the center of the magnetron's anode block. This produces radio energy in the surrounding cavities and frequency of the output is a function of the size of the cavities and their placement, not the input voltage.

As part of the development of radar, the early years of World War II produced rapid development of microwave-frequency electronics and techniques. One of the key advances was the introduction of the cavity magnetron in 1940.

One of the reasons for the intense interest in microwaves was the issue of antenna size; in the VHF region, radar antennas were on the order of metres long, which made them difficult to use on night fighters. In contrast, the magnetron produced wavelengths of 9 cm, with antennas half that length. This meant they could easily fit within the nose area of a night fighter. A simple half-wave dipole has little directivity, but once again the short wavelengths helped as a suitable focusing arrangement using a parabolic dish about a metre wide reduced the beam width to about 5 degrees. This made the system dramatically more useful; not only was the radio energy focussed into a small area and thus produced far stronger reflections, but those reflections could also be accurately located in space by moving the reflector to point at the target. (Note: When Lovell found that moving the dipole in front of the reflector aimed the beam without distortion, he concluded: "the antenna problem is 75% solved.")

The magnetron's potential in communications was understood from the start, but in this role, it had a significant problem. In most radio systems of the era, the audio signal and the radio frequency carrier signal are generated separately and then mixed to produce an amplitude modulated signal that is then amplified for transmission. This requires an amplifier that can produce a range of output frequencies, at least as great as the bandwidth of the audio signal. The magnetron does not allow this; it produces a single frequency that is dependent on its physical construction, defined by the number and size of holes drilled into it. There is no way to modulate the output using a separate signal.

=== PWM ===
General Electric Company (GEC) delivered the first production magnetrons in 1940. PWM was almost perfectly matched for transmission using a magnetron. While the magnetron could not be smoothly modulated in amplitude or frequency, it could be turned on and off very rapidly; it is this quality that makes it useful for radar where short pulses are desirable. To carry communications, the original audio signal was sent into a PWM encoder whose pulsed output was then amplified and used as the power supply to the magnetron. The result was a series of microwave pulses representing the audio signal. On reception, the chain of pulses is sent into a circuit that averages the total energy received, reproducing the audio for output.

As the pulses were quite short compared to the 9 kHz sampling time, much of the signal was empty. This could be easily taken advantage of by using another PWM encoder and delaying its pulses slightly so that its signals were sent after the first. This solved the problem of multiplexing multiple signals into a single connection. Previously, telephone systems accomplished this with frequency division multiplexing, shifting each of the channels by a different carrier frequency so they could all be broadcast at the same time in the same way that many radio stations can share the airwaves on different "channels". As the magnetron could not change its frequency, which is based on its physical construction, this technique would not work. With PWM, the signals were spread out in time instead of frequency. This makes the Number 10 the world's first time-division multiplexing (TDM) system.

The first conceptual design, introduced in 1941, was for a single channel half-duplex system. This would operate like a conventional radio set, where users at either end of a connection have to take turns speaking as they share a single channel. As development continued, accurate filters able to cleanly separate two closely spaced microwave frequencies were developed. This led to a new version that used separate frequencies for the upstream and downstream directions, allowing full-duplex operation, albeit with the small downside that two magnetrons and antennas were required. This was not a difficult change; the recently introduced GL Mk. III radar also used separate dishes for transmission and reception and was easily adapted to the new role.

=== Into service ===
The first experimental sets arrived in July 1942 and were used on a two-stage link between Horsham and 64 Baker Street in London. Overwater testing followed between Ventnor on the Isle of Wight and Beachy Head on the south coast. A production order was sent in early 1944.

The first operational use occurred shortly after D-Day when the transceiver at Beachy Head was moved to Cherbourg. As the Allies advanced into Europe, repeaters were created up by connecting two No. 10 trailers back-to-back with conventional telephone wiring, allowing messages to be relayed over longer distances. Where long-distance landlines were available, these were used to extend the connections between stations.

The result was a network of landlines and No. 10 sets that eventually stretched from Germany back to London. In April and May 1945, a network of seven repeaters linked 21st Army Group with its various field headquarters. The sets were extremely successful. In the entirety of the war, Field Marshal Bernard Montgomery's headquarters lost a direct line to London for a total of one hour.

In post-war debriefings, German radio engineers boasted that they were able to gather British signals with ease. Careful examination of these claims revealed that No. 10 communications had not only never been intercepted, but that the Germans were entirely unaware of its existence.

=== Post-war ===
During the late-war period, the klystron tube had also improved to become a useful system. In contrast to the magnetron, the klystron is a true amplifier, accepting a low-power input signal across a range of frequencies and then outputting it at much higher power. This allowed communications systems to be constructed using frequency division multiplexing. As this was already widely used in telephony with coaxial cable connections, Bell Labs selected this solution for their TD-2 network that was built across the United States during the early 1950s and in many other countries during the later 1950s.

== Technical description ==
The complexity of the system was mostly related to the PWM encoding. The system was based on a master clock signal in the form of a sine wave at 9 kHz. The sine wave was processed in a series of vacuum tubes to produce a sawtooth wave, which was then gated by the audio signal. When the voltage of the sawtooth was above the voltage of the audio signal, an output pulse was produced – the higher the voltage of the audio signal, the smaller the width of the sawtooth above that level, and the shorter the pulse. The final output was a train of pulses at the 9 kHz reference frequency, the width of each pulse being inversely proportional to the audio signal voltage.

The system as a whole had eight of these samplers, referred to as separators. Each one output a pulse of up to 3.5 μs. A fixed delay was added in each sampler, such that channel 2's pulse was output about 5 μs after the one from channel 1. This resulted in a chain of pulses over one complete cycle of the master clock. A separate sync pulse of 20 μs was added in front of channel 1 to allow clock recovery. The pulse chain from the separators is amplified and sent to the transmission magnetron which produces pulses of microwave signal.

Reception is much easier. The microwave signal is received and converted back to the original low-frequency signal using by a superheterodyne tuner. The clock is extracted from the sync signal and each channel is separated out by sampling at fixed times relative to the sync. The separated pulses are fed into low-pass filters that directly produce the original audible signal.

The rest of the system is relatively simple. The magnetron output is sent to a dipole antenna in front of a 2 metres (6 ft 7 in) diameter parabolic reflector. A second reflector antenna was positioned beside the first for reception. The original Mark I units sent signals upstream on 4550 or 4760 MHz, while the receiver was sensitive to the entire range between 4410 and 4888 MHz. The Mark II units shifted this to 4480 and 4840 MHz. The output of the transmitters was typically between 100 and 400 mW.

Range was normally on the order of 20 miles (32 km), but sometimes "well over" 50 miles (80 km). Normally, only seven of the eight telephone channels would be used, leaving one free for the operators at the station to use, or as a backup if one of the others failed.

The system was mounted in a relatively small four-wheel trailer with the antennas on a turntable on top. It could be powered by any mains supply from 100 to 250 volts. The Mark I units could also self-power using two Onan 3 kVA generators mounted on one end of the trailer, while the Mark II used a single PE 95 10 kVA generator with another Onan generator for backup.
