= Tropospheric scatter =

Method of communicating with microwave radio signals over considerable distances

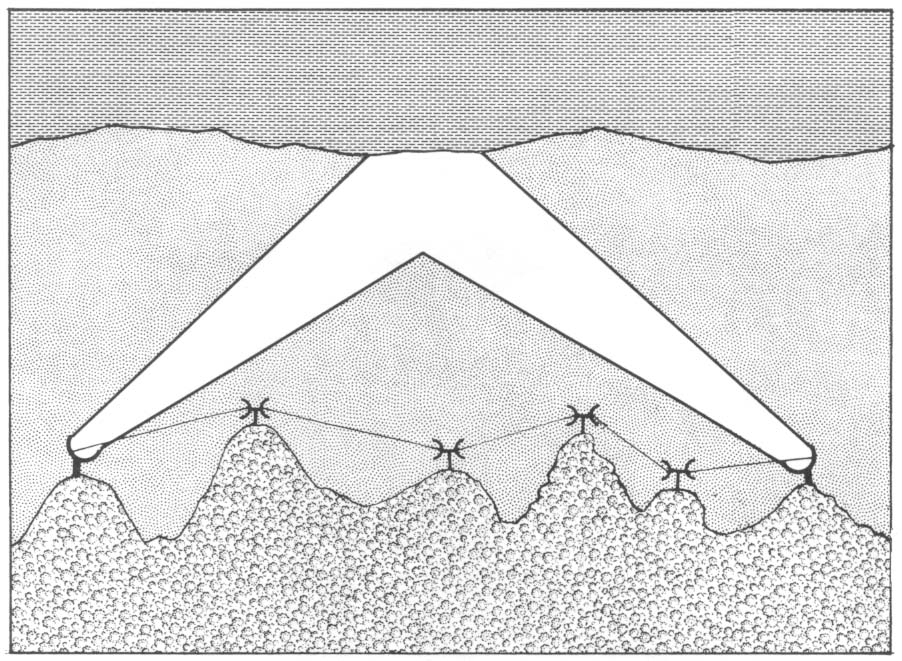
A tropospheric scatter system can bridge large distances (white) while a microwave relay system (lines below) requires multiple relay stations due to its line of sight limitation.

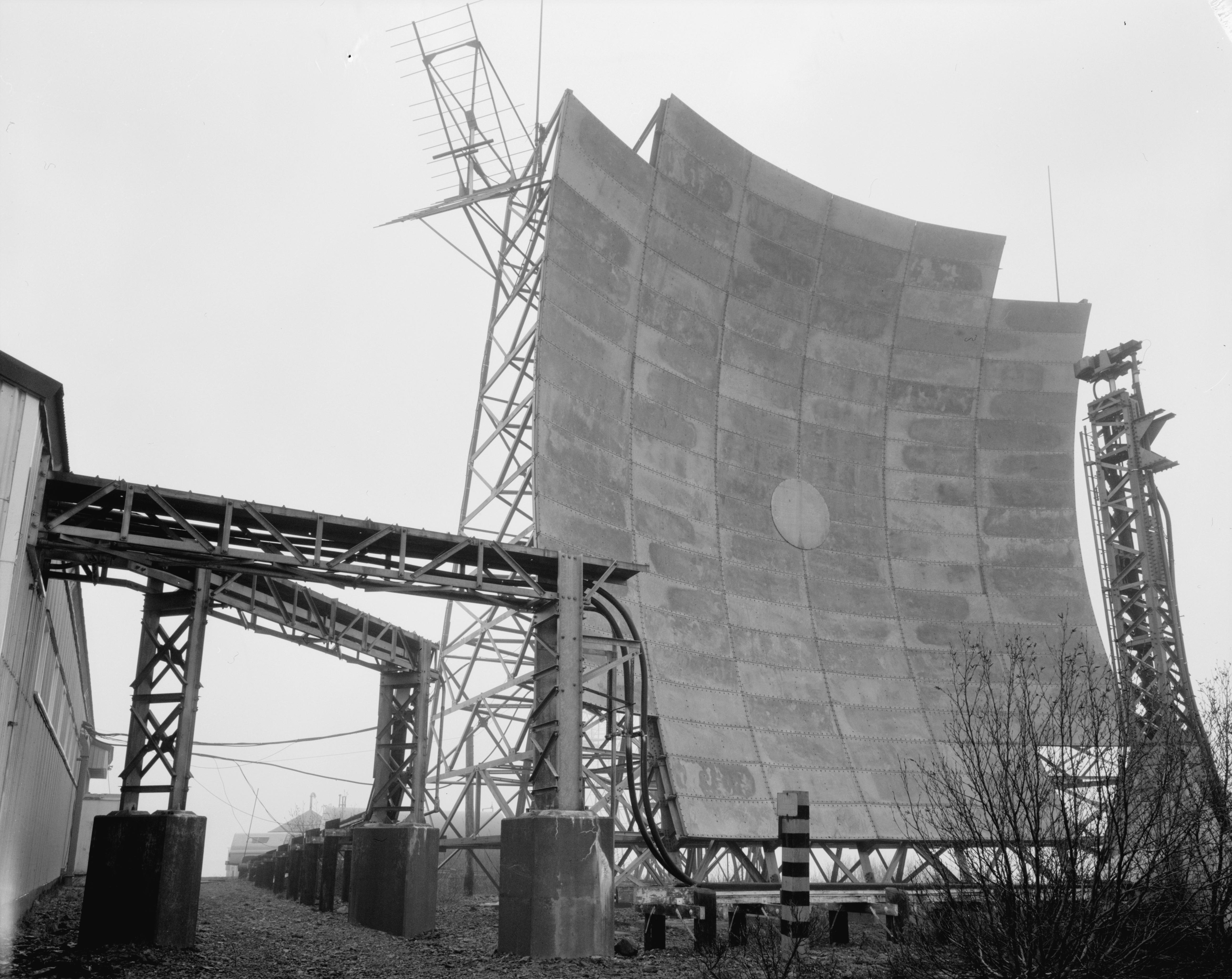
Boswell Bay, Alaska White Alice Site, Tropospheric scatter antenna and feeder.

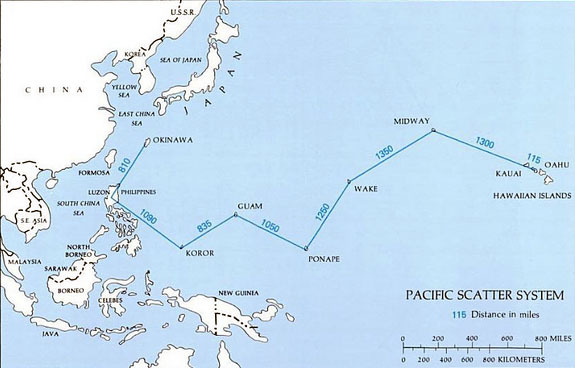
Pacific Scatter System

Tropospheric scatter, also known as troposcatter, is a method of communicating with microwave radio signals over considerable distances – often up to 500 kilometres (310 mi) and further depending on frequency of operation, equipment type, terrain, and climate factors. This method of propagation uses the tropospheric scatter phenomenon, where radio waves at UHF and SHF frequencies are randomly scattered as they pass through the upper layers of the troposphere. Radio signals are transmitted in a narrow beam aimed just above the horizon in the direction of the receiver station. As the signals pass through the troposphere, some of the energy is scattered back toward the Earth, allowing the receiver station to pick up the signal.

Normally, signals in the microwave frequency range travel in straight lines, and so are limited to line-of-sight applications, in which the receiver can be 'seen' by the transmitter. Communication distances are limited by the visual horizon to around 48–64 kilometres (30–40 mi). Troposcatter allows microwave communication beyond the horizon. It was developed in the 1950s and used for military communications until communications satellites largely replaced it in the 1970s.

Because the troposphere is turbulent and has a high proportion of moisture, the tropospheric scatter radio signals are refracted and consequently only a tiny proportion of the transmitted radio energy is collected by the receiving antennas. Frequencies of transmission around 2 GHz are best suited for tropospheric scatter systems as at this frequency the wavelength of the signal interacts well with the moist, turbulent areas of the troposphere, improving signal-to-noise ratios.

== Overview ==
=== Discovery ===
Prior to World War II, prevailing radio physics theory predicted a relationship between frequency and diffraction that suggested radio signals would follow the curvature of the Earth, but that the strength of the effect would fall off rapidly and especially at higher frequencies. In spite of this widespread belief, during the war there were numerous incidents in which high-frequency radar signals were able to detect targets at ranges far beyond the theoretical calculations. In spite of these repeated instances of anomalous range, the matter was never seriously studied.

In the immediate post-war era, the limitation on television construction was lifted in the United States and millions of sets were sold. This drove an equally rapid expansion of new television stations. Based on the same calculations used during the war, the Federal Communications Commission (FCC) arranged frequency allocations for the new VHF and UHF channels to avoid interference between stations. To everyone's surprise, interference was common, even between widely separated stations. As a result, licenses for new stations were put on hold in what is known as the "television freeze" of 1948.

Bell Labs was among the many organizations that began studying this effect, and concluded it was a previously unknown type of reflection off the tropopause. This was limited to higher frequencies, in the UHF and microwave bands, which is why it had not been seen prior to the war when these frequencies were beyond the ability of existing electronics. Although the vast majority of the signal went through the troposphere and on to space, the tiny amount that was reflected was useful if combined with powerful transmitters and very sensitive receivers. In 1952, Bell began experiments with Lincoln Labs, the MIT-affiliated radar research lab. Using Lincoln's powerful microwave transmitters and Bell's sensitive receivers, they built several experimental systems to test a variety of frequencies and weather effects. When Bell Canada heard of the system they felt it might be useful for a new communications network in Labrador and took one of the systems there for cold weather testing.

In 1954 the results from both test series were complete and construction began on the first troposcatter system, the Pole Vault system that linked Pinetree Line radar systems along the coast of Labrador. Using troposcatter reduced the number of stations from 50 microwave relays scattered through the wilderness to only 10, all located at the radar stations. In spite of their higher unit costs, the new network cost half as much to build as a relay system. Pole Vault was quickly followed by similar systems like White Alice, relays on the Mid-Canada Line and the DEW Line, and during the 1960s, across the Atlantic Ocean and Europe as part of NATO's ACE High system.

=== Use ===
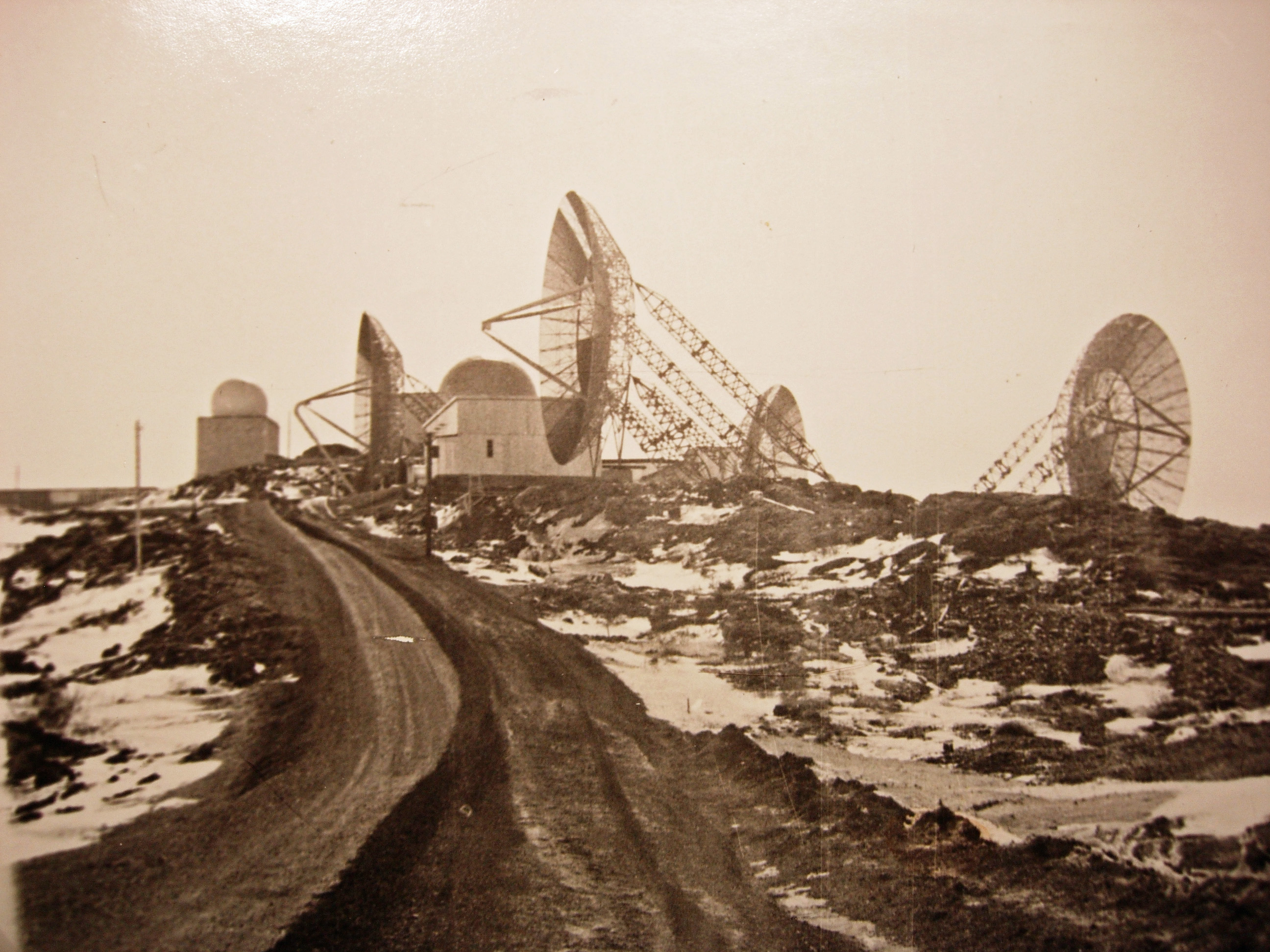
Pole Vault used circular parabolic antennas; later systems generally used squared-off versions sometimes known as "billboards".

The propagation losses are very high; only about one trillionth (10×10^{−12}) of the transmit power is available at the receiver. This demands the use of antennas with extremely large antenna gain. The original Pole Vault system used large parabolic reflector dish antennas, but these were soon replaced by billboard antennas which were somewhat more robust, an important quality given that these systems were often found in harsh locales. Paths were established at distances over 1,000 kilometres (620 mi). They required antennas ranging from 9 to 36 metres (30 to 118 ft) and amplifiers ranging from 1 kW to 50 kW. These were analogue systems which were capable of transmitting a few voice channels.

Troposcatter systems have evolved over the years. With communication satellites used for long-distance communication links, current troposcatter systems are employed over shorter distances than previous systems, use smaller antennas and amplifiers, and have much higher bandwidth capabilities. Typical distances are between 50 and 250 kilometres (31 and 155 mi), though greater distances can be achieved depending on the climate, terrain, and data rate required. Typical antenna sizes range from 1.2 to 12 metres (3 ft 11 in to 39 ft 4 in) while typical amplifier sizes range from 10 W to 2 kW. Data rates over 20 Mbit/s can be achieved with today's technology.

Tropospheric scatter is a fairly secure method of propagation as dish alignment is critical, making it extremely difficult to intercept the signals, especially if transmitted across open water, making them highly attractive to military users. Military systems have tended to be 'thin-line' tropo – so called because only a narrow bandwidth 'information' channel was carried on the tropo system; generally up to 32 analogue (4 kHz bandwidth) channels. Modern military systems are "wideband" as they operate 4-16 Mbit/s digital data channels.

Civilian troposcatter systems, such as the British Telecom (BT) North Sea oil communications network, required higher capacity 'information' channels than were available using HF (high frequency – 3 MHz to 30 MHz) radio signals, before satellite technology was available. The BT systems, based at Scousburgh in the Shetland Islands, Mormond Hill in Aberdeenshire and Row Brow near Scarborough, were capable of transmitting and receiving 156 analogue (4 kHz bandwidth) channels of data and telephony to / from North Sea oil production platforms, using frequency-division multiplexing (FDMX) to combine the channels.

Because of the nature of the turbulence in the troposphere, quadruple diversity propagation paths were used to ensure 99.98% reliability of the service, equating to about 3 minutes of downtime due to propagation drop out per month. The quadruple space and polarisation diversity systems needed two separate dish antennas (spaced several metres apart) and two differently polarised feed horns – one using vertical polarisation, the other using horizontal polarisation. This ensured that at least one signal path was open at any one time. The signals from the four different paths were recombined in the receiver where a phase corrector removed the phase differences of each signal. Phase differences were caused by the different path lengths of each signal from transmitter to receiver. Once phase corrected, the four signals could be combined additively.

== Tropospheric scatter communications networks ==
The tropospheric scatter phenomenon has been used to build both civilian and military communication links in a number of parts of the world, including:

Allied Command Europe Highband (ACE High), NATO
NATO military radiocommunication and early warning system throughout Europe from the Norwegian-Soviet border to the Turkish-Soviet border.

BT (British Telecom), UK
United Kingdom - Shetland to Mormond Hill

Fernmeldeturm Berlin, West Germany
Torfhaus-Berlin, Clenze-Berlin at Cold War times

Portugal Telecom, Portugal
Serra de Nogueira (northeastern Portugal) to Artzamendi (southwestern France)

CNCP Telecommunications, Canada
Tsiigehtchic to Galena Hill, Keno City
Hay River - Port Radium - Lady Franklin Point

Cuba - Florida
Guanabo to Florida City

Project Offices - AT&T Corporation, United States
Project Offices is the name sometimes used to refer to several structurally dependable facilities maintained by the AT&T Corporation in the Mid-Atlantic states since the mid-20th century to house an ongoing, non-public, company project. AT&T began constructing Project Offices in the 1960s. Since the inception of the Project Offices program, the company has chosen not to disclose the exact nature of business conducted at Project Offices. However, it has described them as central facilities.

- Big Hole, Pittsboro, North Carolina
- Buckingham, Virginia
- Peters Mountain, Charlottesville, Virginia
- Leesburg, Virginia
- Hagerstown Facility, Hagerstown, Bear Pond Mountains, Maryland

Texas Towers - Air defence radars, United States Air Force

The Texas Towers were a set of three radar facilities off the eastern seaboard of the United States which were used for surveillance by the United States Air Force during the Cold War. Modeled on the offshore oil drilling platforms first employed off the Texas coast, they were in operation from 1958 to 1963.

Tower ID	Location	Staffing unit	Mainland station	Notes
TT-1	Cashes Ledge off New Hampshire coast 42°53′N 68°57′W			Not built
TT-2	Georges Bank off Cape Cod; 41°45′0.00″N 67°46′0.00″W	762d Radar Squadron	North Truro Air Force Station	decommissioned 1963
TT-3	Nantucket Shoals; 40°45′00.00″N 69°19′0.00″W	773d Radar Squadron	Montauk AFS	decommissioned 1963
TT-4	off Long Beach Island, New Jersey; 39°48′N 72°40′W	646th Radar Squadron	Highlands Air Force Station	collapsed (1961)
TT-5	Browns Bank south of Nova Scotia; 42°47′N 65°37′W			Not built

Mid Canada Line, Canada
A series of five stations (070, 060, 050, 415, 410) in Ontario and Quebec around the lower Hudson Bay. A series of six stations were built in Labrador and Quebec between Goose Bay and Sept-Îles between 1957 and 1958.

Pinetree Line, Pole Vault, Canada
Pole Vault was series of fourteen stations providing communications for Eastern seaboard radar stations of the US/Canadian Pinetree line, running from N-31 Frobisher Bay, Baffin Island to N-22 St. John's, Newfoundland.

White Alice/DEW Line/DEW Training (Cold War era), United States/Canada
A former military and civil communications network with eighty stations stretching up the western seaboard from Port Hardy, Vancouver Island north to Barter Island (BAR), west to Shemya, Alaska (SYA) in the Aleutian Islands (just a few hundred miles from the Soviet Union) and east across arctic Canada to Greenland. Note that not all station were troposcatter, but many were. It also included a training facility for White Alice/DEW line tropo-scatter network located between Pecatonica, Illinois, and Streator, Illinois.

DEW Line (Post Cold War era), United States/Canada
Several tropo-scatter networks providing communications for the extensive air-defence radar chain in the far north of Canada and the US.

North Atlantic Radio System (NARS), NATO
NATO air-defence network stretching from RAF Fylingdales, via Mormond Hill, UK, Sornfelli (Faroe Islands), Höfn, Iceland to Keflavik DYE-5, Rockville.

European Tropospheric Scatter - Army (ET-A), United States Army
A US Army network from RAF Fylingdales to a network in Germany and a single station in France (Maison Fort). The network became active on 1966.

486L Mediterranean Communications System (MEDCOM), United States Air Force
A network covering the European coast of the Mediterranean Sea from San Pablo, Spain, in the west to Incirlik Air Base, Turkey in the East, with headquarters at Ringstead in Dorset, England. Commissioned by the US Air Force in 1966.

Royal Air Force, UK
Communications to British Forces Germany, running from Swingate, Kent to Lammersdorf in Germany.

Troposphären-Nachrichtensystem Bars, Warsaw Pact

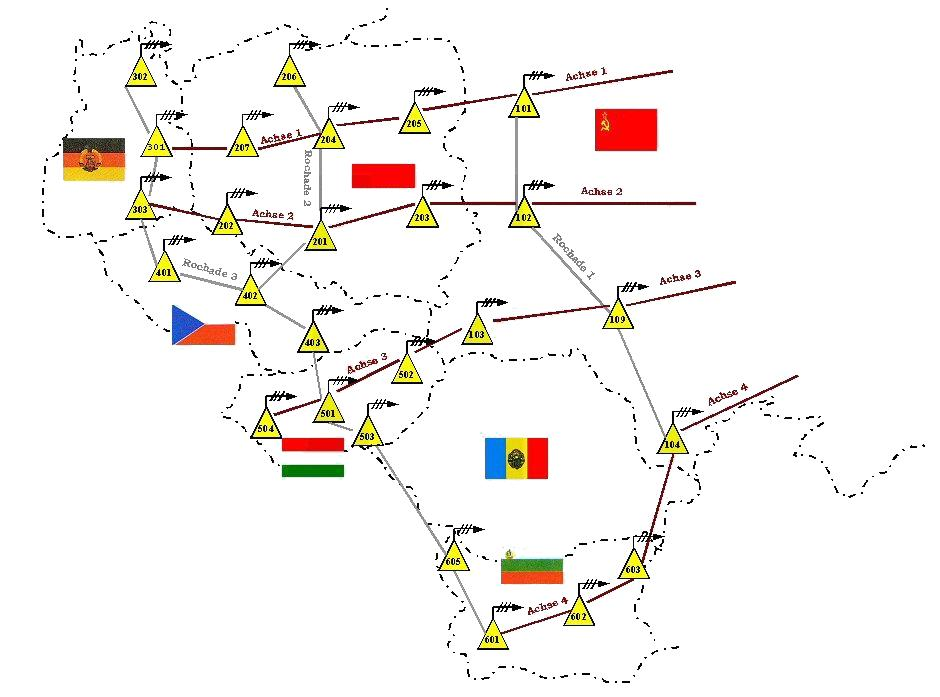
BARS tropo-scatter network map

A Warsaw Pact tropo-scatter network stretching from near Rostock in the DDR (Deutsches Demokratisches Republik), Czechoslovakia, Hungary, Poland, Byelorussia USSR, Ukraine USSR and Bulgaria.

TRRL SEVER, USSR
A Soviet network stretching across the USSR.

India - USSR

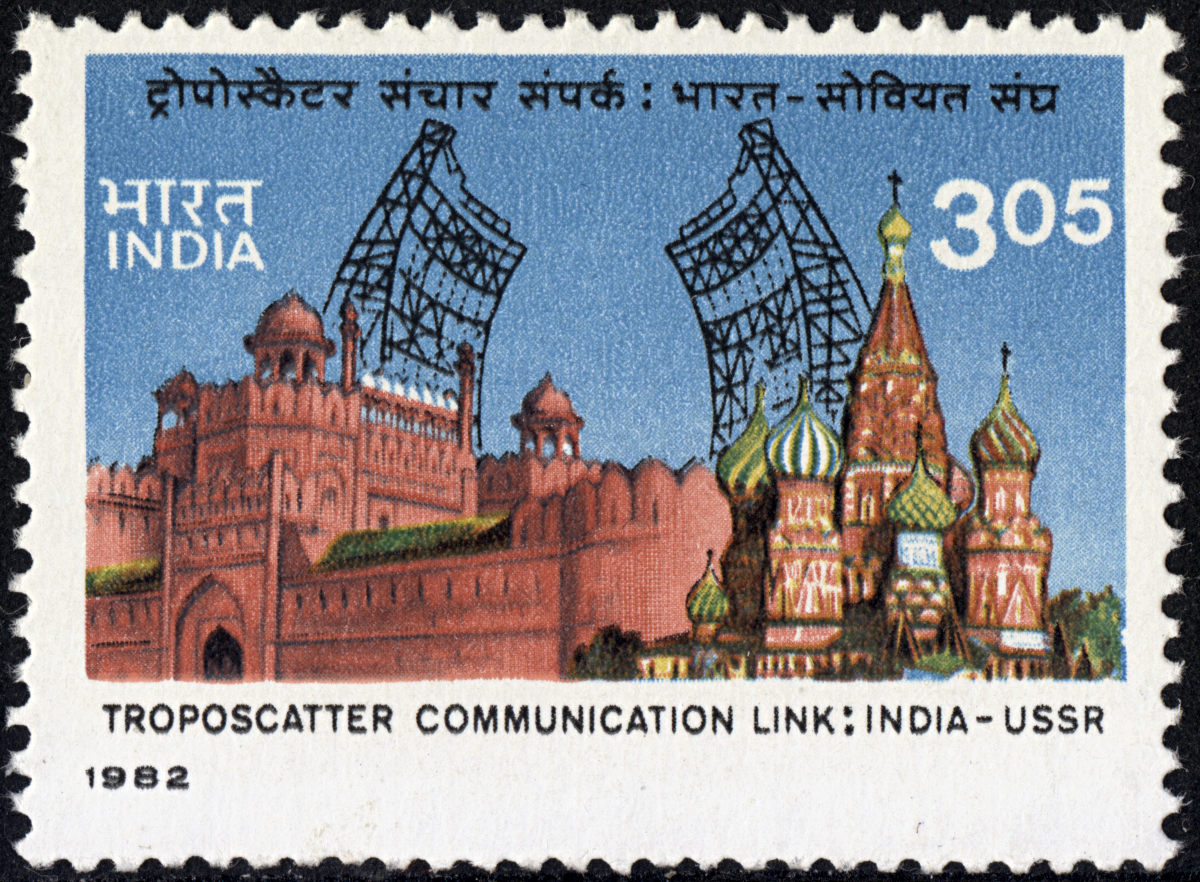
India-USSR troposcatter UHF link on a 1982 stamp of India

A single section from Srinigar, Kashmir, India to Dangara, Tajikistan, USSR.

Indian Air Force, India
Part of an Air Defence Network covering major air bases, radar installations and missile sites in Northern and central India. The network is being phased out to be replaced with more modern fiber-optic based communication systems.

Peace Ruby, Spellout, Peace Net, Imperial State of Iran
An air-defence network set up by the United States prior to the 1979 Islamic Revolution. Spellout built a radar and communications network in the north of Iran. Peace Ruby built another air-defence network in the south and Peace Net integrated the two networks.

Bahrain - UAE
A tropo-scatter system linking Al Manamah, Bahrain to Dubai, United Arab Emirates.

Royal Air Force of Oman, Oman
A tropo-scatter communications system providing military comms to the former SOAF - Sultan of Oman's Air Force, (now RAFO - Royal Air Force of Oman), across the Sultanate of Oman.

Royal Saudi Air Force, Saudi Arabia
A Royal Saudi Air Force tropo-scatter network linking major airbases and population centres in Saudi Arabia.

Yemen, Yemen
A single system linking Sanaa with Saada.

BACK PORCH and Integrated Wideband Communications System (IWCS), United States
Two networks run by the United States linking military bases in Thailand and South Vietnam. Stations were located at Bangkok, Ubon Royal Thai Air Force Base, Pleiku, Nha Trang, Vung Chua mountain (13.742°N 109.196°E) Quy Nhon, Monkey Mountain Facility Da Nang, Phu Bai Combat Base, Pr Line (11.868°N 108.547°E) near Da Lat, Hon Cong mountain An Khê, Phu Lam (10.752°N 106.627°E) Saigon, VC Hill (10.36°N 107.068°E) Vũng Tàu and Cần Thơ.

Phil-Tai-Oki, Taiwan
A system linking the Taiwan with the Philippines and Okinawa.

Cable & Wireless Caribbean network
A troposcatter link was established by Cable & Wireless in 1960, linking Barbados with Port of Spain, Trinidad. The network was extended further south to Georgetown, Guyana in 1965.

Japanese Troposcatter Networks, Japan
Two networks linking Japanese islands from North to South.

== Tactical Troposcatter Communication systems ==
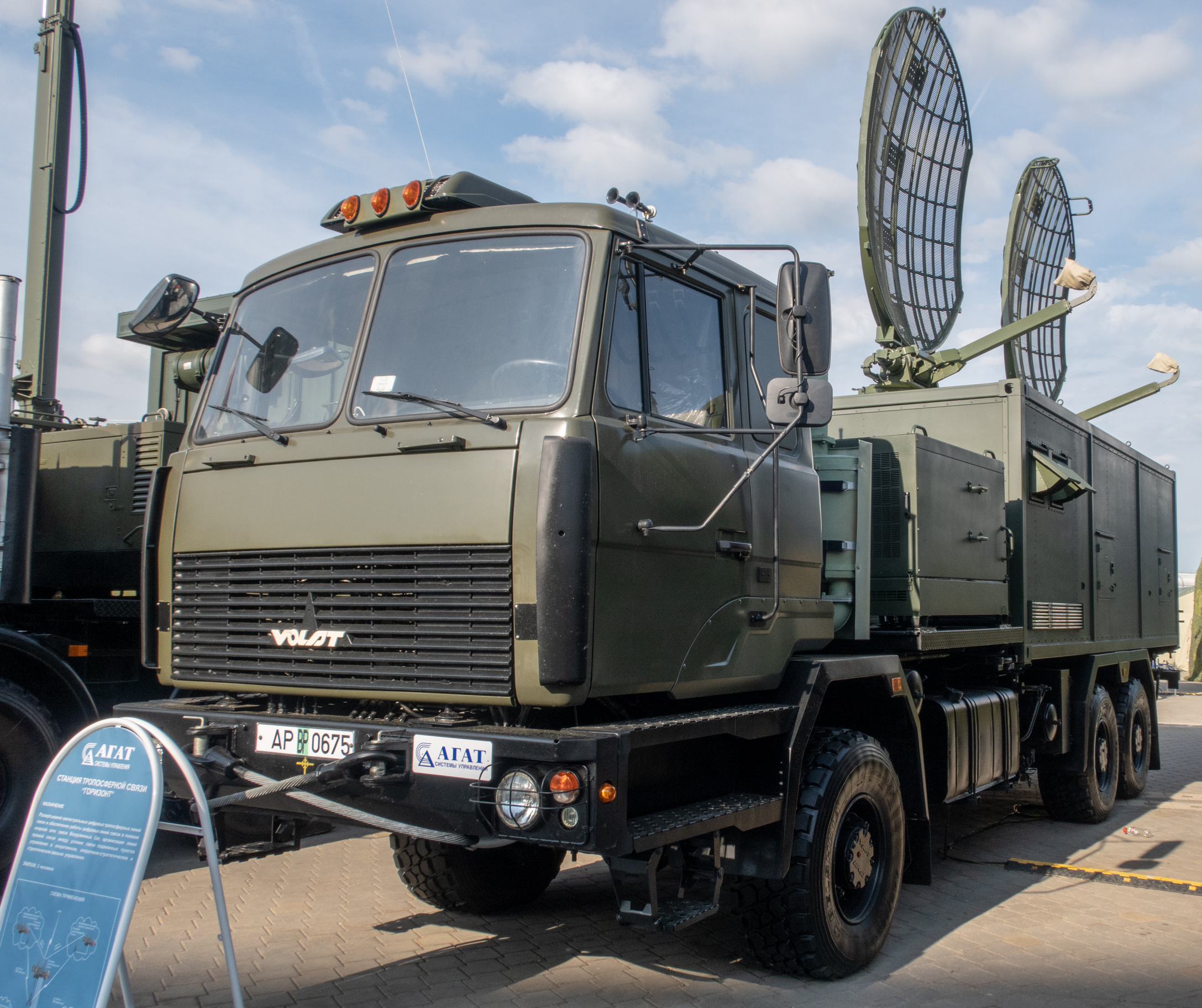
Belarusian "Horizon" mobile tropospheric scatter communication system

As well as the permanent networks detailed above, there have been many tactical transportable systems produced by several countries:

Soviet / Russian Troposcatter Systems
MNIRTI R-423-1 Brig-1/R-423-2A Brig-2A/R-423-1KF
MNIRTI R-444 Eshelon / R-444-7,5 Eshelon D
MNIRTI R-420 Atlet-D
NIRTI R-417 Baget/R-417S Baget S
NPP Radiosvyaz R-412 A/B/F/S TORF
MNIRTI R-410/R-410-5,5/R-410-7,5 Atlet / Albatros
MNIRTI R-408/R-408M Baklan

People's Republic of China (PRoC), People's Liberation Army (PLA) Troposcatter Systems
CETC TS-504 Troposcatter Communication System
CETC TS-510/GS-510 Troposcatter Communication System

Western Troposcatter Systems
AN/TRC-97 Troposcatter Communication System
AN/TRC-170 Tropospheric Scatter Microwave Radio Terminal
AN/GRC-201 Troposcatter Communication System
AN/TRC-245 Next Generation Troposcatter

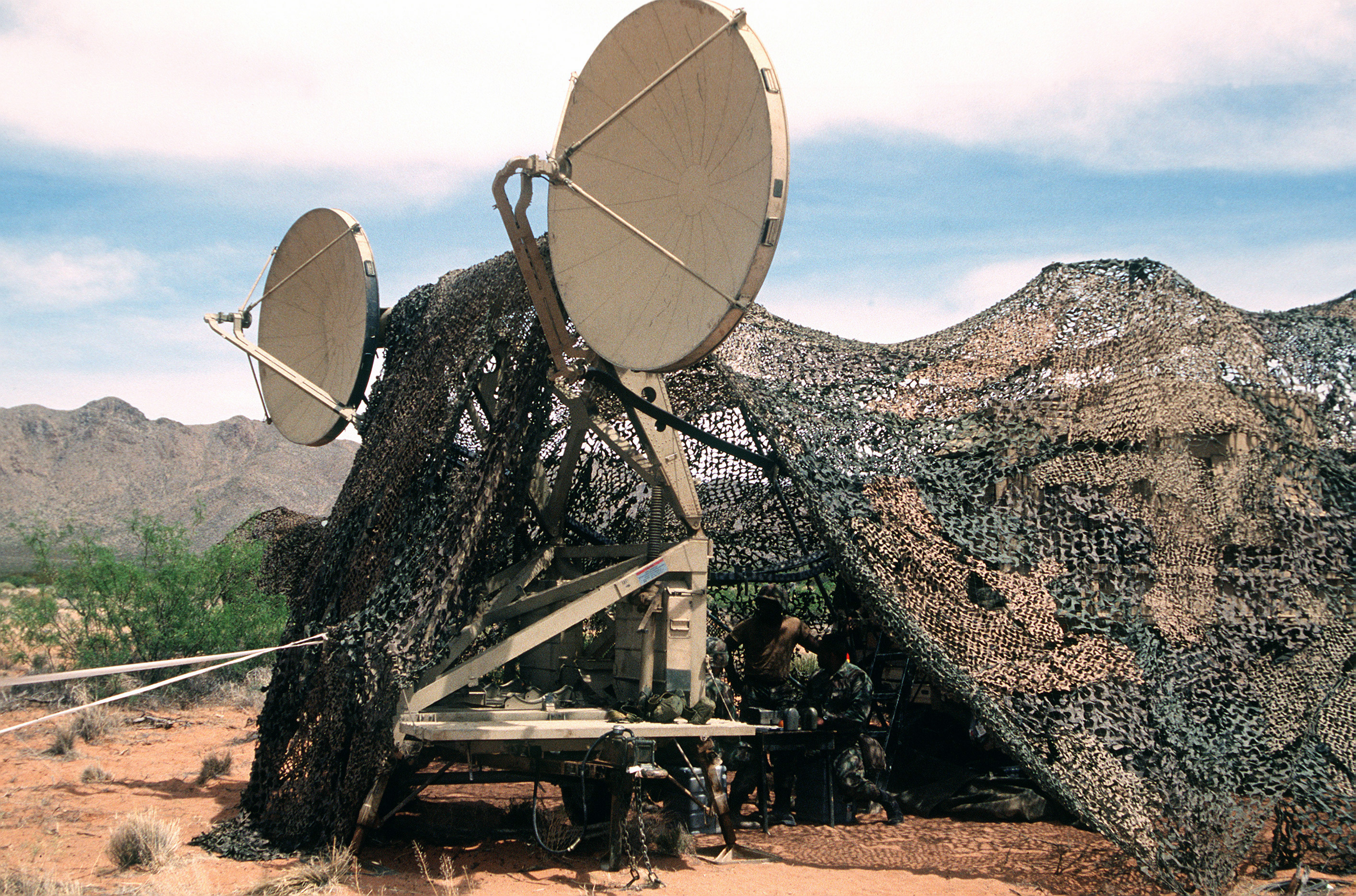
US Army TRC-170 Tropo Scatter Microwave System

The U.S. Army and Air Force use tactical tropospheric scatter systems developed by Raytheon for long haul communications. The systems come in two configurations, the original "heavy tropo", and a newer "light tropo" configuration exist. The systems provide four multiplexed group channels and trunk encryption, and 16 or 32 local analog phone extensions. The U.S. Marine Corps also uses the same device, albeit an older version.

== See also ==
- Radio propagation
- Non-line-of-sight propagation
- Microwave
- ACE High - Cold war era NATO European troposcatter network
- White Alice Communications System - Cold war era Alaskan tropospheric communications link
- List of White Alice Communications System sites
- TV and FM DX
- Distant Early Warning Line
