= Pepperrell Air Force Base =

Decommissioned United States military base

Pepperrell Air Force Base
- St. John's, Newfoundland
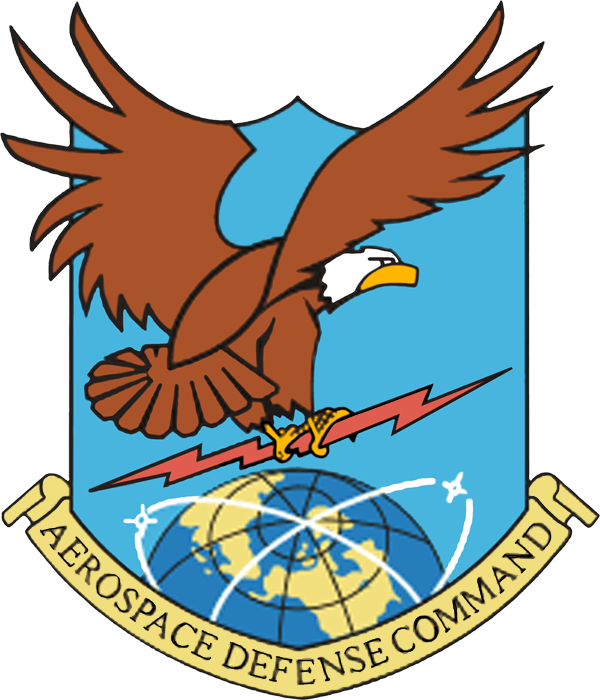
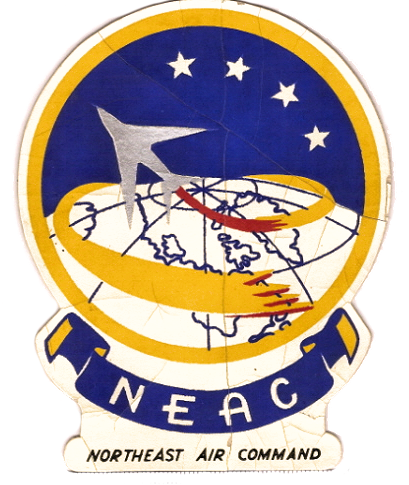
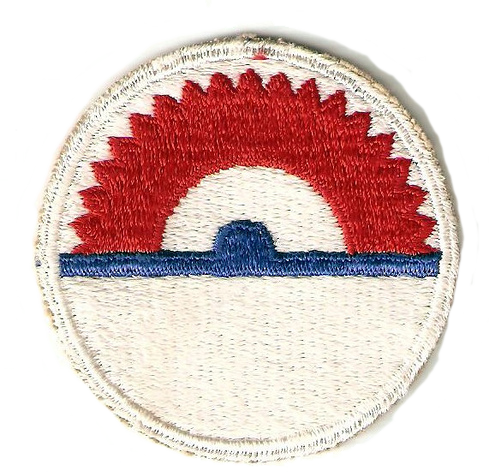
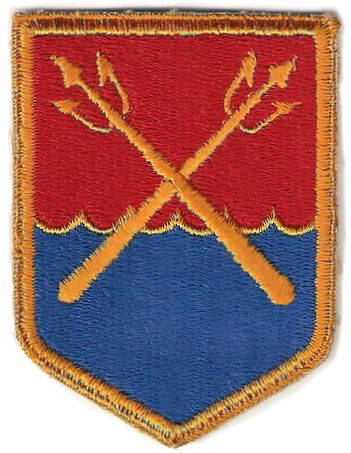
- Insignia of units assigned to Pepperrell Air Force Base

Site information
- Type: Military base
- Owner: Department of Defence
- Operator: United States Air Force; 1941 – 1961
- Controlled by: United States

Location
- Location on Newfoundland
- Coordinates: 47°35′10″N 52°41′31″W

Site history
- Built: 1941
- Built by: United States Army
- In use: 1941 – present

Garrison information
- Garrison: United States Air Force; United States Army Air Corps; Aerospace Defense Command; Northeast Air Command; Newfoundland Base Command; Eastern Defense Command
- Occupants: 3rd Infantry Regiment; 685th Air Warning Squadron; 24th Coast Artillery; 52nd Air Defense Artillery Regiment; 53rd Coast Artillery; 62nd Coast Artillery; 6604th Air Base Wing

Pepperrell Air Force Base, previously known as Fort Pepperrell, is a decommissioned United States military base located in St. John's, Newfoundland, Canada (Note: Until 1949, Newfoundland was a separate dominion, and not a province of Canada) which operated from 1941 to 1961.

The base was named in honour of Sir William Pepperrell (1696–1759) of Kittery, Maine, commander of a force of 4,200 soldiers and sailors aboard 90 ships, who captured the French seaport at Louisbourg after a 46-day siege on June 16, 1745.

== Establishment ==
In October 1940, the governments of the United States and United Kingdom signed a contract known as the Destroyers for Bases Agreement, whereby the United States (still a neutral country) would provide 50 ex-United States Navy destroyers in exchange for the right to lease territory in British territories in Newfoundland and the Caribbean. Of particular importance was Newfoundland, which the United States sought to arm as a buffer area similar to Alaska territory.

A board of experts on naval and air bases arrived in St. John's by March 1940 to investigate areas necessary for developments being considered by the recently set-up Canadian/United States Defence Board, and with the agreements signed and most of the negotiations completed, the first movement of U.S. troops to Newfoundland was planned.

Colonel L.W. Rook was judge advocate of the US Army "lend-lease" force commanded by Gen. Charles H. Bonesteel.

On March 27, 1941, a 99-year lease was acquired from the United Kingdom (the UK did not want to sell or give land away so a 99-year lease system was set up) for construction of air and naval bases on sites in Newfoundland, Bermuda, Bahamas, Jamaica, Antigua, St. Lucia, Trinidad and Guinea. The Leased Bases Agreement provided wide powers to the United States military in taking necessary steps to defend the areas around its leased bases, including additional powers in time of war or emergency.

One of the locations under consideration for a military base was St. John's, the capital city, which was approved by Newfoundland Governor Sir Humphrey T. Walwyn.

== Construction ==
Several steps had been taken by the British and Newfoundland governments pre-dating the official signing of the agreement, which identified the preferred site for a military installation along the north side of Quidi Vidi Lake, in the northeast part of St. John's.

Field work began on the site on October 15, 1940.

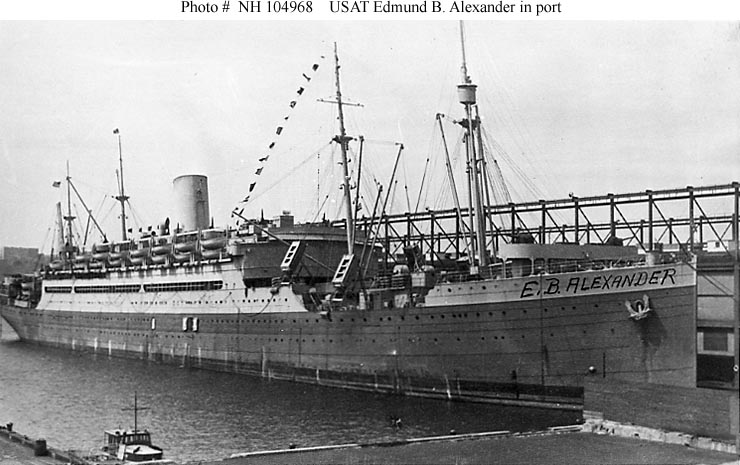
United States Army troop transport ship Edmund B. Alexander

On January 15, 1941, the Newfoundland Base Command was activated on board the United States Army troop transport ship USAT Edmund B. Alexander, the largest ship ever to dock in St. John's Harbour. On March 27, 1941, the United States officially signed the Lend-Lease agreement which gave possession of the site for the installation; construction work began in earnest soon afterward.

The military base in St. John's was to be operated by the United States Army Air Forces (USAAF), as U.S. military interest in Newfoundland was deemed to be primarily an air-defence mission. A major United States Navy base and air station was simultaneously under construction at Naval Station Argentia, along with a USAAF base at Stephenville. Coast defence elements at Argentia were at Fort McAndrew.

The harbor facilities, population base, and seat of government at St. John's precluded some form of headquarters facility for the base under construction adjacent to Quidi Vidi Lake; therefore, it was decided that Newfoundland Base Command would be established in the capital to coordinate all US military operations in Newfoundland, as well as in the Danish territory of Greenland.

The new installation was to be named Fort Pepperrell, following the tradition of naming United States Army facilities, even though it was primarily to see use by the USAAF.

During April and May 1941, the Newfoundland base contractor's personnel began arriving on the island, and construction was taken over by their organization. On April 15 a lease was signed with Carpasian Park Limited, for 15 acres (61,000 m^{2}) of land upon which to build Camp Alexander, a temporary tent camp named in honor of the ship USS Edmund B. Alexander, to be located on Carpasian Road.

On May 20, troops from the 3rd U.S. Infantry Regiment quartered aboard USAT Edmund B. Alexander began moving into their new temporary camp. The reasons behind the apparently slow pace of construction for the base was likely related to the fact that the United States did not enter the war until late 1941. Canada and Newfoundland, by contrast, were at war, along with most of the rest of the British Commonwealth. A separate series of Canada-Newfoundland defense agreements saw Canada's military activity in the country restricted to war-time conditions, and by 1940–1941, both Canada and Newfoundland were increasingly desperate to defend the territory. War-time shortages meant that the Canadian military did not build permanent military bases but did create temporary facilities to house air force and naval units at Botwood, Gander, Bell Island and St. John's. The Canadian military buildings were often erected quickly and cheaply with materials available locally. By contrast, the more deliberate pace set by the still-neutral US military saw their construction in Newfoundland planned for a much more substantial investment, intended to last the length of the 99-year lease.

== Wartime operations ==
Lt. Col. J.J. Yates assumed command of Fort Pepperrell on November 28, 1941, and was replaced on December 2 by Colonel Paul N. Starling.

Troops of the United States Army Coast Artillery Corps manned two coast defence batteries and some anti-aircraft batteries at Fort Pepperrell. In January 1941 part of Battery A, 57th Coast Artillery (Tractor Drawn) (TD) Regiment with two mobile 155 mm guns probably arrived on USAT Edmund B. Alexander. On 1 May 1941 part of Battery D, 52nd Coast Artillery (Railway) Regiment arrived with two 8-inch M1888 railway guns. A command known as the Harbor Defenses of Argentia and St. John's was established in January 1941 to coordinate US coast defence activities in Newfoundland, under the Newfoundland Base Command. On 12 February 1942 Battery D, 52nd CA was redesignated as Battery D, 24th Coast Artillery (Harbor Defense) (Composite) Regiment, which was assuming control of US coast defense assets in Newfoundland. By 1942 the battery of two 155 mm guns of Battery A, 53rd Coast Artillery (Tractor Drawn) Regiment (redesignated from the 57th CA on 20 July 1941 and on 16 February 1942 made part of the 24th CA) had three prepared positions featuring Panama mounts at Signal Hill, Middle Cove, and Manuels. The 8-inch battery was initially at Signal Hill, but relocated to Red Cliff circa 1943. Also in the area was a Canadian-manned battery of two Lend-Lease 10-inch M1888 guns at Fort Cape Spear; the gun barrels remained there as of 2017. Other Canadian-manned guns included at least two QF 4.7-inch B Mark IV* guns at Fort Amherst; these were former field guns converted to fixed mountings.

A Royal Canadian Navy-manned indicator loop station was at St. John's; this detected submarines via their magnetic signature.

Fort Pepperrell expanded significantly after the United States entered the war with the attack on Pearl Harbor in December 1941. During late 1941 and early 1942, multiple units left the temporary tent city to fill the new military base until capacity was reached on February 27, 1942, when the final unit, the headquarters of Newfoundland Base Command, moved from temporary facilities at 44 Rennie's Mill Road. The base held approximately 5,500 personnel and it, along with other US military facilities in Newfoundland such as Naval Station Argentia, Fort McAndrew, and Stephenville Air Base were placed on a war alert. Extensive exercises and maneuvers took place in Newfoundland during the summer and fall of 1942.

Beginning with the 21st Signal Service Company, the US military began to link up Edmund B. Alexander with the temporary shore establishments. The communications link to Naval Station Argentia from St. John's was later installed and then across the entire island to Stephenville Air Base, thus providing a permanent dial telephone system between the bases.

Between May 1, 1942, and December 15, 1942, the Argentia-Holyrood Road was constructed and 500 miles (800 km) of telephone communication extended across Newfoundland. One such difficult link in the cross country communication line was the 110-mile (180 km) stretch from Stephenville to Port aux Basques. The 2,000-foot (610 m) Long Range Mountains were crossed and wires were stretched over the top. Siberian huskies were used to tow sleds with heavy equipment up the dangerous slopes of the mountains. The task was completed with a telephone network far surpassing anything Newfoundland had ever had.

On December 12, 1942, a number of servicemen were killed in the Knights of Columbus Hostel fire.

On January 7, 1943, Brigadier General John B. Brooks assumed command of the Newfoundland Base Command and on March 15 of the same year, work was completed at Fort Pepperrell. St. John's Harbour, one of two ice-free ports on the island during the winter months, was engaged in unloading supplies necessary to maintain the Newfoundland garrisons. During the war years, all supplies shipped to other US military installations in Newfoundland were processed through Fort Pepperrell before being forwarded on the narrow gauge trains of the Newfoundland Railway.

On October 10, 1944, Brigadier General Samuel Connell arrived at Fort Pepperrell and assumed command of the Newfoundland Base Command, and in November 1944, the first man to be called on temporary active duty status left the Newfoundland Base Command for the Zone of Interior. On February 8, Headquarters Company, St. John's Area, was formed and the Headquarters Detachment discontinued. On December 23, 1945, Colonel Albert Warren assumed command of the Newfoundland Base Command.

== Units stationed ==
Fort Pepperrell was designed to accommodate 3,500 personnel with indoor storage for 310 vehicles, 146,315 square feet (13,593 m^{2}) of covered warehouse space, and outdoor storage of approximately twenty acres for vehicles, lumber, equipment, and supplies. The base also had its own radio station VOUS which carried US radio network shows and Armed Forces Radio Service broadcasts.

On February 27, 1942, the headquarters for the Newfoundland Base Command had moved from temporary quarters at 44 Rennie's Mill Road on the estate of the country's former prime minister, Sir Richard Squires. At this time, Fort Pepperrell's capacity was increased to 5,500 personnel. Roads on the base followed a unique survey design in the form of a stylized cowboy hat. The streets have undergone some minor changes over the years, however the pattern is still noticeable by following Roosevelt Avenue, Churchill Avenue and Charter Avenue—these street names being in honour of the Atlantic Charter.

Barracks at Fort Pepperrell

The primary tenant unit at the base was the 6604th Air Base Wing, which maintained and operated Fort Pepperrell.

In March 1952, John Williams was assigned to Northeast Air Command 596th Air Force Band at the base. Williams wrote his first film composition later in 1952 while stationed at the base for a promotional film titled You Are Welcome, created for the Newfoundland tourist information office.

The Royal Canadian Air Force established RCAF Station Torbay on December 15, 1941, and shared this facility with the USAAF and USN, along with the Royal Air Force.

== Cold War ==
Peacetime left the future of the Newfoundland Base Command and Fort Pepperrell unclear, since the deactivation of units and redeployment of forces had been going on at a rapid pace. But word finally came from the Adjutant General setting forth the post-war mission for Newfoundland. This was to provide local security for and maintain U.S. Army installations and areas and to facilitate operations of the Air Transport Command and maintain liaison with U.S. Navy and allied nations and local commands.

In 1947, the USAAF became the United States Air Force. In accordance with the change, Fort Pepperrell, a USAAF installation, changed its name to Pepperrell Air Force Base (Pepperrell AFB).

In the summer of 1950, with the activation of the Northeast Air Command (NEAC), all units of the 1225th Air Base Group were reassigned to that command, bringing to a close the activities of the Newfoundland Base Command.

The Korean War and dawning of the Cold War highlighted the importance of the US military bases in Newfoundland, ensuring their survival in the short term.

By the end of June 1956, 23 separate installations were under the jurisdiction of Pepperrell AFB. Most of the facilities were located on the Avalon Peninsula with the only exception being the Long Lines Repeater Stations, part of the Pinetree Line network.

Pepperrell AFB's three primary facilities were the base on Quidi Vidi Lake, the USAF docks at St. John's Harbour, and its shared use of the former RCAF Station Torbay (renamed St. John's Airport following World War II) where terminal facilities were leased to the USAF.

From 1946 to 1956, USAF costs at RCAF Station Torbay/St. John's Airport totalled $2 million for rent, maintenance and construction. The USAF constructed two 25,000-square-foot (2,300 m^{2}) aircraft hangars as well as a 36,000-square-foot (3,300 m^{2}) machine shop and administrative offices at the airfield to support Pepperrell AFB.

Following the Korean War, the late 1950s saw the importance of Pepperrell AFB decline as the US military consolidated its Newfoundland facilities in light of changing threats and technology employed by the Soviet Union and the Warsaw Pact.

The food services and air installations were the responsibility of the 64th Air Division, which transferred responsibility to a smaller unit, the 6604th Operations Squadron on May 1, 1956. The responsibility for commercial transportation rested with the base's Maintenance and Supply Commander while military transportation was the responsibility of the 6604th Operations Squadron. In a 6-month period in 1956, 862,500 miles (1,388,100 km) were driven, using 93,900 gallons of gasoline, and the base handled requests for 18,560 taxi trips.

The 138th Engineer Aviation Group, SCARWAF (Special Category Army With Air Force) was inactivated on May 31, 1956, along with its 15 officers and 70 enlisted men.

The 622nd Engineer Aviation Maintenance Company was subsequently inactivated along with its 4 officers and 95 enlisted men. The Engineer Aviation Battalion remained at Pepperrell AFB and was placed under the control of the US Army from Governor's Island in New York City.

For operational control and support, Headquarters 5th Weather Group and Detachment Number 12 were attached to the 6604 Operations Squadron on March 1, 1956. On June 1, 1956, the 6982nd Mobile Radio Squadron was attached to the squadron for logistic support. Colonel Floyd M. Johnson assumed command of the 6604th Squadron during this time due to the temporary absence of the Commander, Colonel Graeme S. Bond.

== Costs ==
In 1956, maintenance and operational projects at Pepperrell AFB totalled $21,307,681. The total personnel assignment numbered 5,400 (2,702 in the Wing).

By the end of the year, the civilian complement decreased from 1,738 to 1,685; officers increased from 129 to 132 while airmen decreased from 814 to 777. The operational cost of the base averaged $2,000,000 monthly, the two highest costs being military pay (over $1,000,000 monthly) and civilian pay ($500,000 monthly). Operating costs at the Wing averaged over $1,000,000 a month with a high of $1,505,173 recorded in December 1955. Figured in the Wing costs were military pay ($350,000 monthly), civilian pay ($420,000), monthly supplies ($210,000 monthly), contractual services ($20,000 monthly) and other ($50,000 monthly).

A cost savings program was implemented at Pepperrell AFB, resulting in a total savings of $915,505.72. The largest recorded amount was by the 1805th AACS Wing when they succeeded in establishing direct route communications between Goose AFB and Thule AFB. The improvement in estimated gains was $758,000. The second largest recorded savings was by the Food Services Branch. The savings resulted from standardization of a master menu for command wide use. Under the old system 240 man hours monthly were required. This was reduced to 80 man hours. One of the smaller savings was the publication of the base phone book every four months instead of every three months.

== Civilian employment ==
Civilian employees were processed by the Civilian Personnel Office. In hiring civilian personnel, including U.S. nationals, it was required that the applicant furnish the names and addresses of all previous employers and five references, names and locations of all schools attended, a birth certificate and a certificate of conduct from the St. John's Constabulary. All names were checked against a civilian unsuitability list.

Letters were written to all schools attended by the prospective employee, to all former employers and to persons listed as references. If derogatory information is received, the letters were filed in the official personnel folder of the employee concerned. Prior to employment and every year after, each applicant underwent a complete physical examination.

Clearance was then completed and an identification card was issued.

== Flight activities and training ==
Each pilot of the 6604th ABW was required to put in 100 hours of flying on an annual basis, divided equally between the first and second half of the fiscal year. Typical hours would include twenty hours of weather flying, fifteen hours of night flying (50% as co-pilot) and up to ten missions as instructor pilot. The total number of hours put in by the Wing was 16,800 for the 168 pilots.

In 1955, cross-island flights to the North American mainland were begun as a means of testing the pilots proficiency and making full use of the airplanes. This was set up over a three-day period of six flight hours per day, every six months.

== Base closure ==
The strategic importance of the base continued to decline, and it was identified for closure in 1959.

On May 15, 1961, the last American forces departed Pepperrell AFB when the United States Army Transportation Terminal Command Arctic closed its headquarters.

On August 10, 1961, the American flag was lowered at Pepperrell AFB and the Union Jack and the Canadian Red Ensign were raised as the base property was transferred back to the Crown. The Government of Canada kept a small portion of the base for use as what is now CFS St. John's. The remainder was transferred to the Government of Newfoundland, which subsequently sold off and developed the remainder of the property.

As a legacy to Newfoundland, and in honor of Dr. Charles Alberton Janeway, on August 9, 1966, the Janeway Children’s Hospital opened its doors in the building previously used by the United States Air Force as its on-base hospital. The old facility, with a bomb shelter in the basement, was demolished in 2010.

The former brick junior/senior high school building on the base, which hosted classes for the first time during the 1956–57 school year, later became a Children's Rehabilitation Center and, most recently, has been renovated and converted into condominiums. The base theater, located just inside the main gate, was torn down in 1984, and the old Base Hospital was demolished in the 2008 timeframe, with the fire station/Security Police facility and warehouse/vehicle maintenance facilities near the old main gate coming down in the past decade. While a number of the original buildings constructed in the early 1940s do still remain, including the old base gymnasium/bowling alley and NCO quarters area, a majority number have now been demolished. Sadly for those formerly associated with the base, demolition dramatically increased during the 2013-2017 timeframe, during which all of the original base facilities in the approximate west quarter of the base were torn down, including both the entire junior officers' quarters (400 block) and senior officers' quarters (500 block) areas, as well as the Officers Club and five other adjacent buildings collocated in its same block.

== See also ==
- Ernest Harmon Air Force Base
- Naval Station Argentia
- CFB Goose Bay
