= Harbor Defenses of Argentia and St. John's =

Harbor Defenses of Argentia & St. John's
- Part of Harbor Defense Command
- Avalon Peninsula in Dominion of Newfoundland
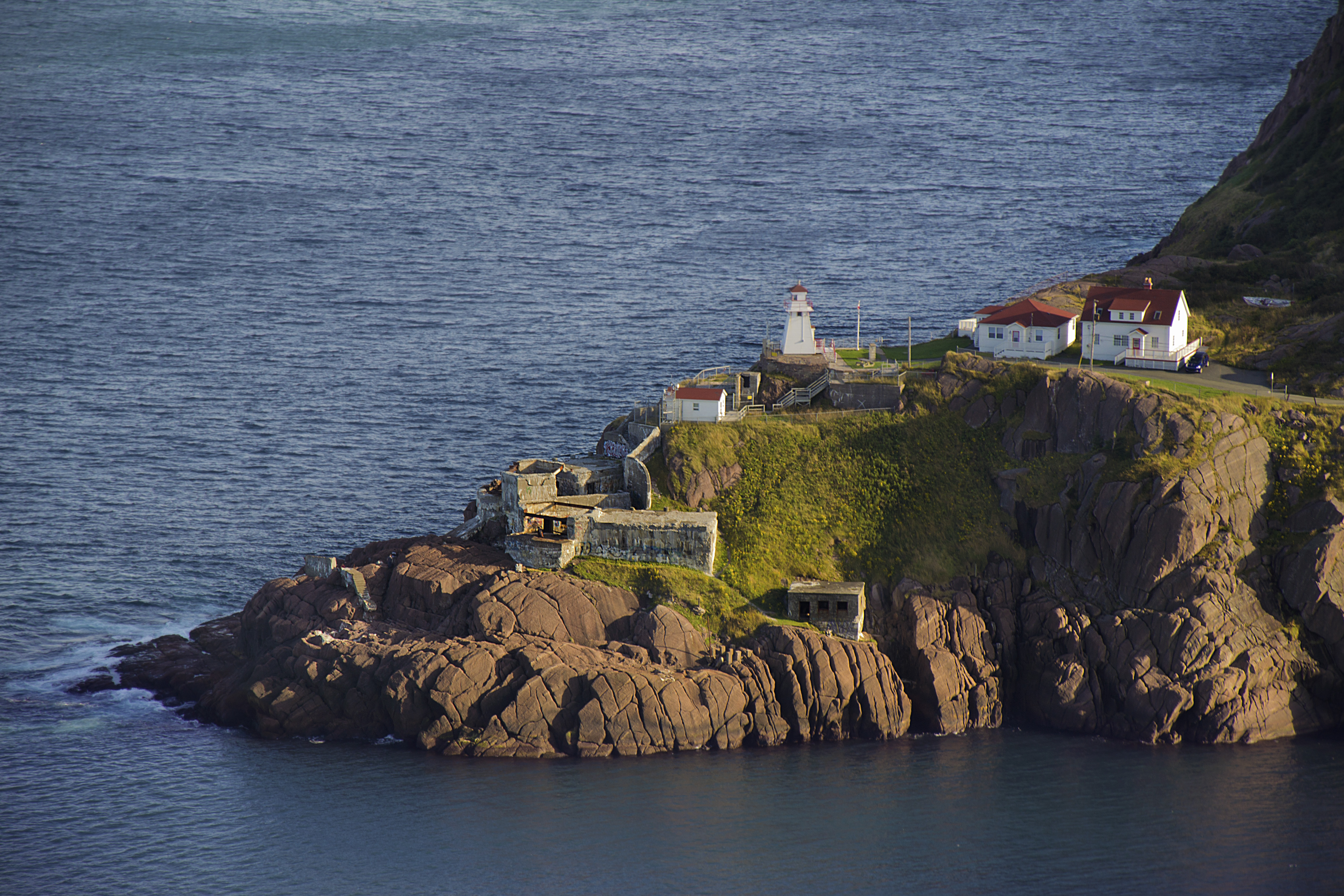
- Coastal artillery battery at Fort Amherst

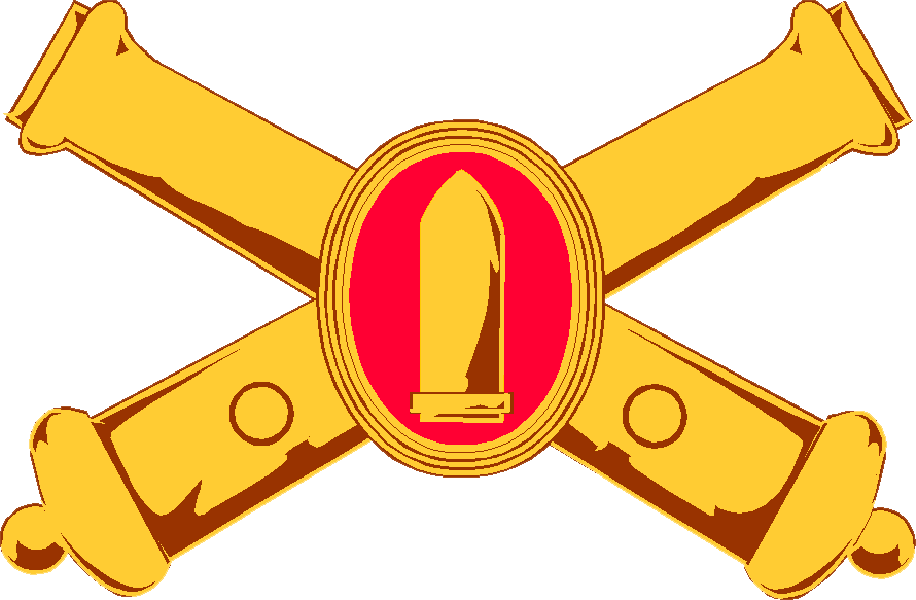

Site information
- Type: Coastal Artillery
- Owner: Department of War
- Operator: United States Army; 1941 – 1945

Site history
- Built: 1941
- Built by: United States Army
- In use: 1941 – 1945
- Battles/wars: Battle of the Atlantic

Garrison information
- Garrison: Fort Pepperrell; US Army Coast Artillery Corps; Newfoundland Base Command
- Occupants: 24th Coast Artillery; 52nd Coast Artillery; 53rd Coast Artillery; 62nd Coast Artillery; 422d Signal Battalion

The Harbor Defenses of Argentia and St. John's was a United States Army Coast Artillery Corps harbor defense command in World War II. It was part of Newfoundland Base Command, established as a result of the 1940 Destroyers for Bases Agreement with the United Kingdom. It coordinated the US Army coast defenses of Naval Station Argentia and the port of St. John's, Newfoundland from January 1941 to 8 September 1945. These included coast artillery at Fort McAndrew in Argentia and Fort Pepperrell in St. John's.

== History ==
On 15 January 1941, Newfoundland Base Command was activated on board the United States Army troop transport ship USAT Edmund B. Alexander at the New York Port of Embarkation. The ship departed for Argentia and St. John's on the 20th, arriving at Argentia on the 25th to drop off troops and construction personnel, and soon docking in St. John's as a barracks ship until May 1941, when housing for the garrison was finished. The ship brought troops of the 3rd Battalion, 3rd Infantry Regiment, Battery A of the 57th Coast Artillery (Tractor Drawn) (TD) Regiment with four mobile 155 mm guns, and Battery B of the 62nd Coast Artillery (Anti-aircraft) (AA) Regiment. It appears the 155 mm gun battery may have been split with two guns each at Argentia and St. John's; their presence at St. John's prior to 1942 is uncertain. It is likely the other units were split also. Although the harbor defense command was reportedly activated with the arrival of the 155 mm gun battery, it was on a small scale initially. On 27 March 1941 the United States officially signed the Lend-Lease agreement which gave possession of the site for Fort Pepperrell (initially Camp Alexander) near St. John's; construction work began in earnest on 15 April. The Naval Operating Base at Naval Station Argentia was commissioned on 15 July 1941; the adjacent Naval Air Station (NAS) Argentia was commissioned 28 August 1941.

On 20 July 1941 the 155 mm gun battery was redesignated as Battery A, 53rd Coast Artillery (TD) Regiment, and on 1 August 1941 (some sources 1942) the AA battery was redesignated as Battery A, 421st CA (AA) Battalion (Separate). At some time the remainder of the 421st probably arrived in Newfoundland. On 14 April 1942 a second AA battalion, the 422nd CA (AA) (Composite) arrived in Newfoundland. On 11 November 1943 the CA (AA) battalions were redesignated as Antiaircraft Artillery (AAA) Battalions (Composite). Both battalions returned to the United States in January 1944.

During 1941 two Lend-Lease 10-inch M1888 disappearing guns were emplaced at Fort Cape Spear near St. John's; these were manned by Canadian forces. Another pair of 10-inch guns were at Phillip's Head to guard Botwood in northern Newfoundland. These were supplemented by at least two Canadian-manned QF 4.7-inch B Mark IV* guns at Fort Amherst; these were former field guns converted to fixed mountings. On 1 May 1941 part of Battery D, 52nd Coast Artillery (Railway) Regiment arrived at Fort Pepperrell with two 8-inch M1888 railway guns, initially emplaced at Signal Hill. At some point in 1942-43 they moved to Red Cliff.

In the summer of 1941, USS Prairie (AD-15) deployed to Argentia to house flag headquarters for the base.

On 7 December 1941 the United States entered World War II following the attack on Pearl Harbor. Construction ramped up at US facilities in Newfoundland; for coast defense batteries this was primarily at Argentia. The major effort at this time was the construction of Battery 281 and Battery 282 at Fort McAndrew from January through October 1942. These batteries had two 6-inch guns each, on shielded long-range carriages with reinforced concrete and earth bunkers housing magazines and fire control equipment.

Two indicator loop stations for magnetic detection of submarines were established in Newfoundland; a US Navy-manned station at Argentia (Station 1X) and a Royal Canadian Navy-manned station at St. John's.

On 14 February 1942 the 1st Battalion, 3rd Infantry Regiment was activated in Newfoundland, joining the 3rd Battalion; the remainder of the regiment arrived on 6 July 1942. The 2nd Battalion moved to Greenland at some point soon afterward, and the regiment departed Newfoundland in September 1943. On 16 February 1942 the 8-inch and 155 mm batteries were redesignated as elements of the 24th Coast Artillery Regiment, which became the primary coast artillery unit in Newfoundland through October 1944 at least, and possibly to the end of hostilities. The regimental headquarters and two additional batteries arrived at Fort McAndrew on 25 March 1942.

== Coastal artillery sites ==
By the end of 1942 the US-manned coast defense gun batteries in Newfoundland were as follows:

Name	No. of guns	Gun type	Carriage type	Location
Battery 155 – Manuels	2	Canon de 155 mm GPF	Panama mount	47°31′52″N 52°57′24″W
Battery 155 – Middle Cove	2	Canon de 155 mm GPF	Panama mount	47°39′06″N 52°41′29″W
Battery 281	2	6-inch gun M1905	shielded barbette	47°17′26″N 53°58′46″W
Battery 282	2	6-inch gun M1905	shielded barbette	47°16′25″N 53°59′22″W
Battery 954	2	6-inch/50-caliber gun (Navy Mark 8)	pedestal	47°16′43″N 54°00′08″W
Battery 604	2	6"/50 caliber gun (Navy Mark 8)	pedestal	47°18′51″N 54°00′16″W
Battery 955	2	3-inch gun M1903	pedestal	47°19′21″N 53°56′59″W
Bell Island Battery	2	QF 4.7-inch Mk I – IV naval gun	Central Pivot Mounts Mark I.	47°37′49″N 52°55′36″W
Cape Spear Battery	2	8-inch M1888 railway guns	railway	47°31′21″N 52°37′22″W
Chain Rock AMTB Battery	2	75 mm gun M2–M6	pedestal	47°34′03″N 52°41′15″W
Anti-Motor Torpedo Boat Battery (AMTB) Roche Point	4	90 mm gun	2 fixed, 2 mobile	47°19′02″N 53°58′41″W
AMTB Ship Harbour Point	4	90 mm gun	2 fixed, 2 mobile	47°21′09″N 53°55′36″W
Fire Control No. 11	2	8-inch M1888 railway gun	railway	47°35′10″N 52°40′20″W
Fire Control No. 12	2	8-inch M1888 railway gun	railway	47°38′48″N 52°39′41″W
Fire Control No. 16	2	8-inch M1888 railway gun	railway	47°42′06″N 52°41′58″W
Fort Amherst	2	Casemated QF 4.7-inch gun	pedestal	47°33′49″N 52°40′48″W
Fort Chain Rock	2	75mm gun	pedestal	47°34′03″N 52°41′16″W
Lewisporte Battery	2	75mm gun	pedestal	49°14′40″N 55°03′17″W
Phillip's Head Battery	2	Casemated 4.7" QF gun	pedestal	49°13′29″N 55°18′06″W
Signal Hill Battery	2	8-inch M1888 railway gun	railway	47°34′15″N 52°40′52″W
T8503	2	Canon de 155 mm GPF	Panama mount	48°31′53″N 58°33′26″W
Battery AMTB - Black Point	2	90 mm gun M1/M2/M3	pedestal	47°11′40″N 54°02′25″W
Blackhead Battery	2	A two-gun dummy (decoy) battery		47°31′52″N 52°38′34″W
Wiseman's Cove Battery	2	8-inch M1888 railway gun	railway	49°13′52″N 55°13′41″W

The Anti-Motor Torpedo Boat (AMTB) batteries had four 90 mm dual-purpose guns each, two on fixed mounts and two on towed mounts.

The 24th Coast Artillery was reduced to a battalion on 23 March 1943. The unit was partially inactivated in January 1944 (HHB and one battery inactivated; one source says fully inactivated), and in October 1944 the battalion was reorganized with at least one battery inactivated. If fully inactivated, possibly its functions and personnel were transferred to the harbor defense command. Its date of return to the US is unclear, and unusually it was not fully inactivated until 8 September 1945.

=== Post World War II ===
Following the war, it was soon determined that gun defenses were obsolete, and most guns (unusually, not the Canadian-manned guns mentioned or Batteries 281 and 282) were scrapped by the end of 1948. Argentia remained a US Navy station until 1994, and Fort Pepperrell became Pepperrell Air Force Base in 1947, but was transferred to Canada as CFS St. John's in 1961.

== Campaign streamers ==
World War II

- American Theater without inscription

== Present ==
The pair of Canadian-manned 10-inch guns at Fort Cape Spear remain in place without carriages, and the pair of 4.7-inch guns at Fort Amherst are still mounted as of 2025. Unusually, the four guns of Batteries 281 and 282 were never scrapped. Battery 282's pair of 6-inch guns remain in place, while Battery 281's guns and mountings were shipped to Fort Columbia in Washington state, US for display at a similar battery there in 1993.

== See also ==
- Seacoast defense in the United States
- Harbor Defense Command
