= 24th Coast Artillery (United States) =

24th Coast Artillery Regiment
- Active: 1942 - 1945
- Country: United States
- Branch: Army
- Type: Coast artillery
- Role: Harbor defense
- Size: Regiment
- Part of: Harbor Defenses of Argentia and St. John's
- Garrison/HQ: Fort Pepperrell
- Mascot: Oozlefinch

The 24th Coast Artillery Regiment was a Coast Artillery regiment in the United States Army. It was the garrison of the Harbor Defenses of Argentia and St. John's, Newfoundland from February 1942 through October 1944, as a battalion after March 1943.

== Lineage ==
Constituted 13 January 1942 and activated 17 January 1942 at Fort H.G. Wright, New York as 24th Coast Artillery (HD) Regiment (Composite). HHB and Batteries A and B organized at Fort H.G. Wright. Batteries C, D, and E organized 16 February 42 at Fort Pepperrell in Newfoundland Base Command (NBC) with personnel reassigned from Battery A, 53rd Coast Artillery (Tractor Drawn) (TD) Regiment; Battery D, 52nd Coast Artillery (Railway) Regiment; and 2nd Platoon, Battery G, 53rd CA (TD) Regt, that were inactivated in Newfoundland and transferred back to their parent regiments in CONUS, less personnel and equipment.

- HHB and Batteries A and B were transferred 3 March 1942 to the New York Port of Embarkation for transshipment to Newfoundland, arriving at Fort McAndrew, Newfoundland 25 March 1942.
- Battery F activated 27 June 1942.
- Reorganized as 24th CA (HD) Battalion (Separate) 23 March 1943; reorganized as 24th CA (HD) Battalion (Composite) 10 April 1943.
- HHB and Battery C transferred to Camp Shanks, New York for inactivation and reassignment of personnel, arriving 2 January 1944. Detachment of 24th CA Battalion transferred to Camp Shelby, Mississippi 4 January 1944, inactivated and personnel reassigned to Army Ground Forces upon arrival 15 January 1944.
- The remainder (HHD, Batteries A, B, D, and F) operated in NBC with detachments at Harmon Field and Fort McAndrew until reorganized October 1944. Battery B inactivated Fort Jackson, SC. HHD, Batteries A, D, and F transferred to Camp Myles Standish, Massachusetts, where the battalion was inactivated and disbanded 8 September 1945.

== See also ==
- Seacoast defense in the United States
- United States Army Coast Artillery Corps
- Harbor Defense Command
