= 27th Coast Artillery (United States) =

27th Coast Artillery Battalion
- Active: 1918; 1942 - 1944
- Country: United States
- Branch: Army
- Type: Coastal artillery
- Role: Harbor defense
- Size: Battalion
- Part of: Harbor Defenses of Bermuda
- Garrison/HQ: Fort Bell
- Mascot: Oozlefinch

The 27th Coast Artillery Battalion was a Coast Artillery battalion in the United States Army. It was the garrison of the Harbor Defenses of Bermuda, part of the US Army's Bermuda Base Command, from February 1942 through June 1944. A predecessor unit in World War I was the 27th Artillery (Coast Artillery Corps), which existed briefly from October through December 1918.

== World War I ==
The 27th Artillery (Coast Artillery Corps), which was a regiment, was organized in October 1918 at Fort Stevens, Oregon. Moved to Camp Eustis, Virginia later that month; demobilized there in December 1918.

== World War II ==
The 27th Coast Artillery Battalion (Composite) was organized on 20 February 1942 at Castle Harbour, Bermuda by redesignating US Army coast artillery units already in Bermuda. These included Battery F, 52nd Coast Artillery (CA) Regiment and Batteries B, G, and H (searchlight) of the 53rd Coast Artillery Regiment; the latter three had been redesignated from components of the 57th CA in July 1941. On 1 August 1943 the identifier "6-inch gun" was added to the battalion's designation, as the primary batteries (construction nos. 283 and 284) garrisoned by it at that time were of that caliber. The 27th CA Battalion was inactivated at the Royal Bermuda Yacht Club on 1 June 1944. Typically, as US coast artillery units were demobilized late in the war, their assets would be transferred to their parent harbor defense command, in this case the Harbor Defenses of Bermuda.

== See also ==
- Seacoast defense in the United States
- United States Army Coast Artillery Corps
- Harbor Defense Command
