= Red Cliff Air Station =

General Surveillance Radar station

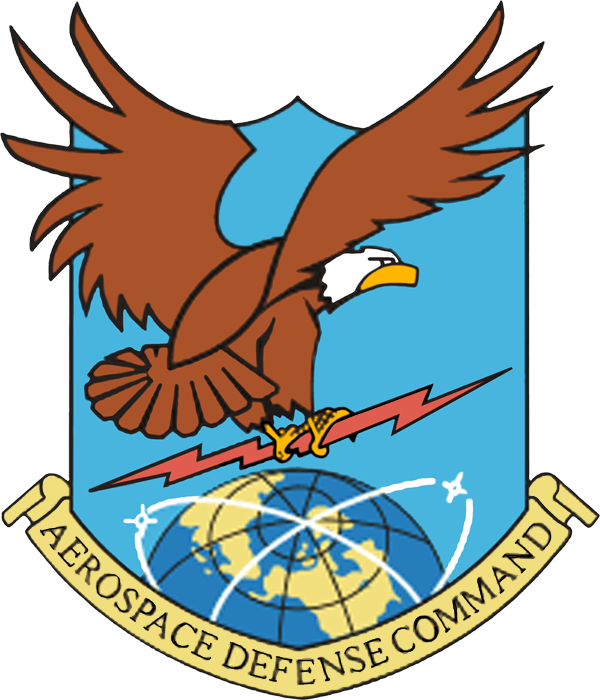
Red Cliff Air Station
- Part of Pinetree Line
- Newfoundland, Canada
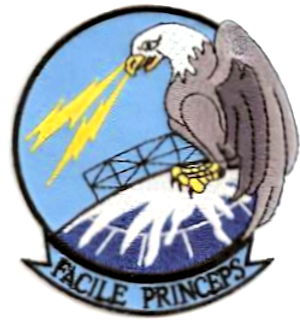
- Emblem of the 642d Aircraft Control and Warning Squadron

Site information
- Type: Radar Station
- Code: N-22
- Controlled by: Northeast Air Command; Aerospace Defense Command

Location
- Coordinates: 47°38′20″N 052°40′02″W

Site history
- Built: 1953
- Built by: United States Air Force
- In use: 1953-1961

Location of Red Cliff Air Station, Newfoundland

Red Cliff Air Station (Also known as St. Johns) (ID: N-22, C-22) was a General Surveillance Radar station. The remains of which are located 5.8 miles (9.3 km) north-northeast of St. John's, Newfoundland and Labrador, Canada. It was closed in 1961.

== History ==
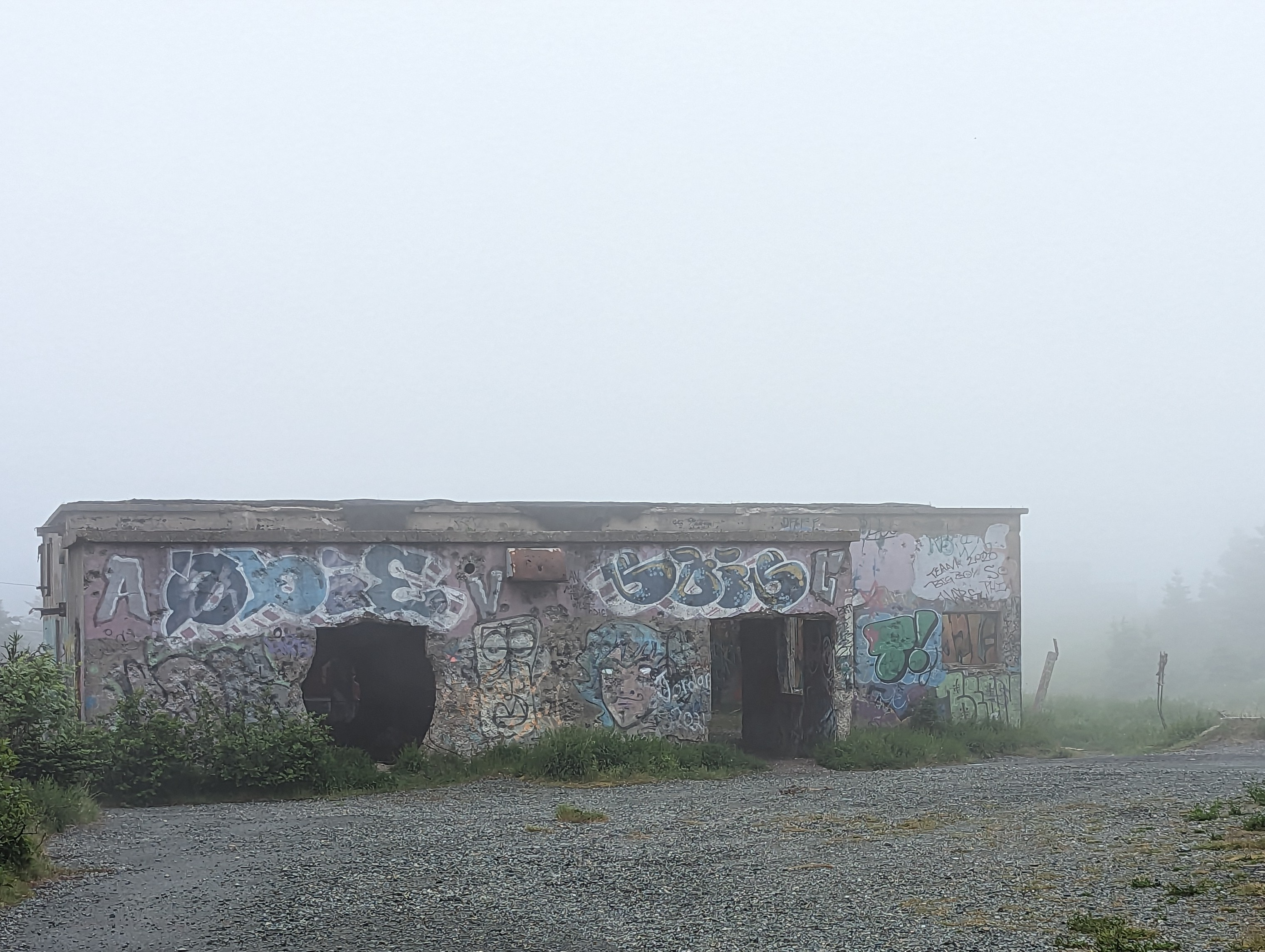
Ruins at the site of the battery in 2023

During World War II a US Army-manned battery of two 8-inch railway guns was located at Red Cliff, part of Fort Pepperrell in St. John's.

The site was established in 1953 as a general surveillance radar station, funded by the United States Air Force, one of the many that would make up the Pinetree Line of Ground Control Intercept (GCI) radar sites.

Northeast Air Command moved the 108th Aircraft Control and Warning Squadron to the station on 1 January 1953. The site was the most eastern ground radar site in North America of the USAF. On 1 August, the 108th was returned to the New York Air National Guard, and the 642d Aircraft Control and Warning Squadron assumed its equipment and personnel. It operated the following radars:

- Search Radars: AN/FPS-502, AN/CPS-6B
- Height Radars: AN/TPS-502, AN/CPS-6B

As a GCI base, the station's role was to guide interceptor aircraft toward unidentified intruders picked up on the unit's radar scopes. These interceptors were assigned to the 64th Air Division at Goose Air Force Base, Labrador.

The station was reassigned to Aerospace Defense Command on 1 April 1957, and was given designation "N-22" (later "C-22").

In addition to the main facility, Red Cliff operated an AN/FPS-14 manned Gap Filler site:

- Elliston Ridge Air Station (N-22B): 48°37′33″N 053°03′31″W (Detachment 1, 642d AC&WS)

The Elliston Ridge site operated between 1957 and 1961 in a relatively isolated location on the Bonavista Peninsula, about 70 miles northwest of the main station. Parts of the station remain intact, although abandoned to the elements since its closure. Broadcasting station CJOZ-FM maintains and transmits from a building and tower on the same property of the Eliston Ridge site.

Red Cliff Air Station was closed on 1 October 1961. The site is abandoned, unused since its closure; most of the structures remain.

== USAF units and assignments ==
Units:

- 108th Aircraft Control and Warning Squadron moved from Torbay Air Station on 1 January 1953

Inactivated and returned to state control on 1 August 1953

- 642d Aircraft Control and Warning Squadron activated on 1 August 1953

Inactivated on 1 October 1961

Assignments:

- 64th Air Division, 1 January 1953
- 4731st Air Defense Group, 1 April 1957
- Goose Air Defense Sector, 6 June 1960 – 1 October 1961

== See also ==
- List of USAF Aerospace Defense Command General Surveillance Radar Stations
