= 52nd Air Defense Artillery Regiment =

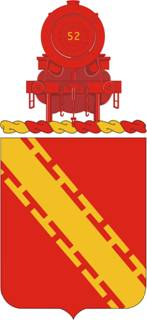
- Coat of arms
- Active: 1917-1943, 1950-present
- Country: United States
- Branch: Army
- Role: Air defense artillery
- Size: Regiment
- Garrison/HQ: Fort Bliss
- Motto: "Semper Paratus" (Always Prepared)
- Colors: Scarlet
- Mascot: Oozlefinch
- Equipment: MIM-104 Patriot; MIM-23 HAWK (former); MIM-14 Nike Hercules (former); MIM-3 Nike Ajax (former); M2 howitzer (former); M1888 (former)
- Decorations: Presidential Unit Citation; Valorous Unit Award; Meritorious Unit Commendation with oak leaf cluster

Insignia
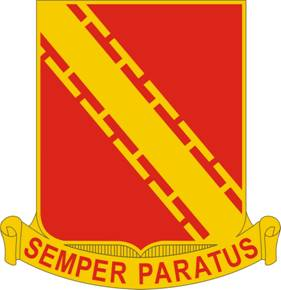
- Distinctive unit insignia

The 52nd Air Defense Artillery Regiment is an air defense artillery regiment of the United States Army first organized in 1917 as a railway gun unit of the Coast Artillery Corps. It was first designated as the 7th Provisional Regiment (Coast Artillery Corps), then the 52nd Artillery Regiment (Coast Artillery Corps), and then the 52nd Coast Artillery Regiment. It continued in that role unit 1943, when the regiment was broken into separate battalions, and in the following year the units were reorganized and redesignated as field artillery units. The Combat Arms Regimental System revived the regiment, in name only as the 52nd Artillery Regiment, through regimental affiliation for battalions without a command relationship to each other. The Headquarters and Headquarters Battery of the regiment was reactivated under the 52nd Artillery Group in 1950. The unit was finally redesignated as the 52nd Air Defense Artillery Regiment in 1971 after being consolidated with other units such as the 52nd Field Artillery Battalion. The United States Army Regimental System introduced regimental affiliation to individual soldiers.

== Lineage ==
Organized 22 July 1917 in the Regular Army at Fort Adams, Rhode Island, as the 7th Provisional Regiment, Coast Artillery Corps (CAC), from units of the Coast Defenses of Long Island Sound, Eastern New York, Southern New York, Narragansett Bay, and Port Royal Sound.

Moved overseas August 1917. Redesignated 5 February 1918 as the 52nd Artillery (Coast Artillery Corps). While in France the unit was attached to the 30th Brigade, CAC, and armed with a variety of French- and British-made railway guns, including French 320 mm weapons. Returned to the US January 1919, moved to Fort Eustis, Virginia.

In August 1921, the other railway artillery regiments were inactivated, and the 52nd was reorganized into 1st Battalion (12-inch guns), 2nd Battalion (12-inch mortars), and 3rd Battalion (8-inch M1888 guns).

(3d Battalion inactivated 16 May 1921 at Fort Eustis, Virginia; activated 18 August 1921 at Fort Eustis, Virginia; 1st Battalion inactivated 1 August 1922 at Fort Eustis, Virginia)

Redesignated 1 July 1924 as the 52nd Coast Artillery Regiment.

In 1931 Batteries C and E and HHB, 2nd Battalion were posted at Fort Hancock, New Jersey.

Battery D inactivated 1 November 1938 at Fort Monroe, Virginia; Battery F inactivated 1 February 1940 at Fort Monroe, Virginia; Batteries D and F activated 8 January 1941 at Fort Hancock; 1st Battalion activated 1 June 1941 at Fort Hancock.

Battery D was at St. John's, Newfoundland in the Harbor Defenses of Argentia and St. John's with two 8-inch M1888 railway guns 1 May 1941 through 12 February 1942, when redesignated as Battery D, 24th Coast Artillery Regiment and Battery D transferred (less personnel and equipment) back to the US. Battery F served in the Harbor Defenses of Bermuda with four 8-inch M1888 railway guns from 1 April 1941 through 20 February 1942, when redesignated as part of the 27th Coast Artillery Battalion and similarly transferred back to the US.)

In December 1941 Batteries A and B and Headquarters and Headquarters Battery (HHB) 1st Battalion transferred to Hawaii to reinforce the 41st Coast Artillery there.

Battery E ordered to Harbor Defenses of Puget Sound 16 December 1941, but two gun sections were detached to man two 8-inch Mk. VI railway guns at Manhattan Beach, California near Fort MacArthur. In May 1943 this detachment became Battery A, 285th CA (Rwy) Battalion. The other gun sections went to Port Angeles, Washington and on 17 April 1942 were redesignated as Battery X. Later transferred to Fort Casey; redesignated as Battery B, 285th CA (Rwy) Battalion on 30 March 1943.

From March 1942 until 1 May 1943 Batteries C and D operated Batteries 20 and 21 at Fort Miles, Delaware, with four 8-inch Mk. VI railway guns per battery. Battery C was at Fort Hancock, New Jersey from early 1942 until transferred to Fort Miles in March 1942.

1st Battalion and Batteries A and B returned to Fort Hancock (less personnel and equipment) 16 February 1942. Reorganized with 8-inch Mk. VI railway guns and transferred to Fort John Custis, Virginia on 27 August 1942. Redesignated as the 286th CA (Rwy) Battalion 5 April 1943.

Battery F reorganized with 8-inch Mk. VI railway guns at Fort Hancock, New Jersey after 20 February 1942; transferred to Camp Shelby, Mississippi and inactivated there 18 April 1944. Personnel distributed among five field artillery battalions.

Regiment broken up 1 May 1943 and its elements reorganized and redesignated as follows:

Headquarters and Headquarters Battery disbanded at Fort Hancock, New Jersey
1st, 2d, and 3d Battalions as the 286th, 287th, and 288th Coast Artillery Battalions, respectively (Headquarters and Headquarters Battery, 288th Coast Artillery Battalion, concurrently inactivated at Fort Hancock, New Jersey). The 288th was inactivated after one day of service. The 286th operated one or two railway gun batteries at Fort John Custis, VA until disestablished in August 1944. The 287th operated the two railway gun batteries at Fort Miles, Delaware until disestablished in August 1944.

After 1 May 1943 the above units underwent changes as follows:

Headquarters and Headquarters Battery, 52nd Coast Artillery, reconstituted 28 June 1950 in the Regular Army and redesignated as Headquarters and Headquarters Battery, 52nd Field Artillery Group
Activated 18 January 1952 at Fort Sill, Oklahoma
Redesignated 25 June 1958 as Headquarters and Headquarters Battery, 52nd Artillery Group
Inactivated 30 June 1971 at Fort Sill, Oklahoma

286th Coast Artillery Battalion converted and redesignated 30 August 1944 at Fort Bragg, NC as the 538th Field Artillery Battalion (240 mm howitzer, tractor-drawn). Arrived in France 3 April 1945; returned via Boston Port of Embarkation 13 December 1945.
Inactivated 14 December 1945 at Camp Myles Standish, Massachusetts
Activated 31 December 1946 in the Philippine Islands
Inactivated 30 May 1947 in the Philippine Islands
Activated 22 March 1951 at Camp Carson, Colorado
Inactivated 1 June 1958 in Germany

287th Coast Artillery Battalion converted and redesignated 30 August 1944 at Fort Bragg, NC as the 539th Field Artillery Battalion (240 mm howitzer, tractor-drawn). Arrived in France 3 April 1945; returned via Boston Port of Embarkation 27 December 1945.
Inactivated 28 December 1945 at Camp Myles Standish, Massachusetts
Activated 31 December 1946 in the Philippine Islands
Inactivated 30 May 1947 in the Philippine Islands
Activated 18 March 1955 in Japan
Inactivated 25 March 1956 in Japan

288th Coast Artillery Battalion inactivated 18 April 1944 at Camp Shelby, Mississippi
Disbanded 14 June 1944
Reconstituted 28 June 1950 in the Regular Army; concurrently consolidated with the 52nd Field Artillery Battalion (active) (see ANNEX) and consolidated unit designated as the 52nd Field Artillery Battalion, an element of the 24th Infantry Division
Inactivated 5 June 1958 and relieved from assignment to the 24th Infantry Division

Battery A, 285th Coast Artillery Battalion inactivated 5 May 1944 at Camp Breckinridge, Kentucky
Battery B, 285th Coast Artillery Battalion inactivated 8 May 1944 at Camp Barkeley, Texas

Headquarters and Headquarters Battery, 52nd Artillery Group, and the 538th, 539th, and 52nd Field Artillery Battalions consolidated, reorganized, and redesignated 30 June 1971 as the 52nd Artillery, a parent regiment under the Combat Arms Regimental System

Redesignated 1 September 1971 as the 52nd Air Defense Artillery

Withdrawn 16 April 1988 from the Combat Arms Regimental System and reorganized under the United States Army Regimental System

=== Annex ===
Constituted 1 October 1933 in the Regular Army as the 52nd Field Artillery

Redesignated 26 August 1941 as the 52nd Field Artillery Battalion and assigned to the 24th Infantry Division

Activated 1 October 1941 at Schofield Barracks, Hawaii

== Distinctive unit insignia ==
- Description

A Gold color metal and enamel device 1 1/8 inches (2.9 cm) in height overall consisting of a shield blazoned: Gules, a bend potenté Or. Attached below the shield a Gold scroll inscribed "SEMPER PARATUS" in Red letters.

- Symbolism

The shield is red for Artillery. The gold potenté bend is an adaptation of the cottised bend on the arms of Champagne.

- Background

The distinctive unit insignia was originally approved for the 538th Field Artillery Battalion on 29 December 1951. It was redesignated for the 52nd Artillery Regiment on 19 December 1958. It was redesignated for the 52nd Air Defense Artillery Regiment effective 1 September 1971.

== Coat of arms ==
=== Blazon ===
- Shield

Gules, a bend potenté Or.

- Crest

On a wreath of the colors Or and Gules, a locomotive affronté Gules, charged with the numeral "52" Or. Motto SEMPER PARATUS (Always Prepared).

=== Symbolism ===
- Shield

The shield is red for Artillery. The gold potenté bend is an adaptation of the cottised bend on the arms of Champagne.

- Crest

The crest alludes to World War I service in France.

=== Background ===
The coat of arms was originally approved for the 52nd Artillery, Coast Artillery Corps on 9 April 1921. It was redesignated for the 286th Coast Artillery Battalion and amended to delete the crest on 3 August 1944. It was redesignated for the 538th Field Artillery Battalion on 20 November 1944. The insignia was redesignated for the 52nd Artillery Regiment and amended to add a crest on 19 December 1958. Effective 1 September 1971, the insignia was redesignated for the 52nd Air Defense Artillery Regiment.

== Campaign participation credit ==
World War I: Champagne-Marne; St. Mihiel; Meuse-Argonne; Champagne 1918; Lorraine 1918

World War II: Central Europe; Central Pacific; New Guinea (with arrowhead); Leyte; Luzon; Southern Philippines (with arrowhead)

Korean War: UN Defensive; UN Offensive; CCF Intervention; First UN Counteroffensive; CCF Spring Offensive; UN Summer-Fall Offensive; Second Korean Winter; Korea, Summer 1953

Vietnam: Counteroffensive; Counteroffensive, Phase II; Counteroffensive, Phase III; Tet Counteroffensive; Counteroffensive, Phase IV; Counteroffensive, Phase V; Counteroffensive, Phase VI; Tet 69/Counteroffensive; Summer-Fall 1969; Winter-Spring 1970; Sanctuary Counteroffensive; Counteroffensive, Phase VII

Southwest Asia: Defense of Saudi Arabia; Liberation and Defense of Kuwait

== Decorations ==
Presidential Unit Citation (Army) for DEFENSE OF KOREA

Valorous Unit Award for DAK TO – BEN HET

Valorous Unit Award for SAUDI ARABIA AND BAHRAIN

Meritorious Unit Commendation (Army) for FLORIDA 1962–1963

Meritorious Unit Commendation (Army) for VIETNAM 1966–1969

== Current configuration ==
- 1st Battalion, 52nd Air Defense Artillery Regiment (inactive)
- 2nd Battalion, 52nd Air Defense Artillery Regiment (inactive)
- 3rd Battalion, 52nd Air Defense Artillery Regiment (inactive)
- 4th Battalion, 52nd Air Defense Artillery Regiment (inactive)
- 5th Battalion, 52nd Air Defense Artillery Regiment
- 6th Battalion, 52nd Air Defense Artillery Regiment deployed to Korea
