= Naval Station Argentia =

Former US Navy base in Newfoundland, closed 1994

Naval Station Argentia
- McAndrew Air Force Base
- Argentia, Newfoundland in Canada
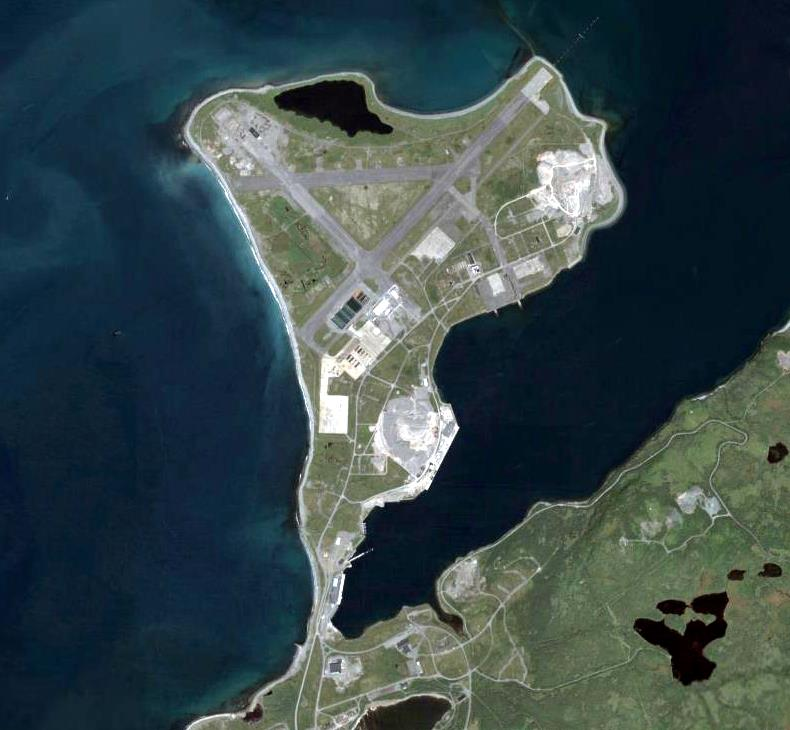

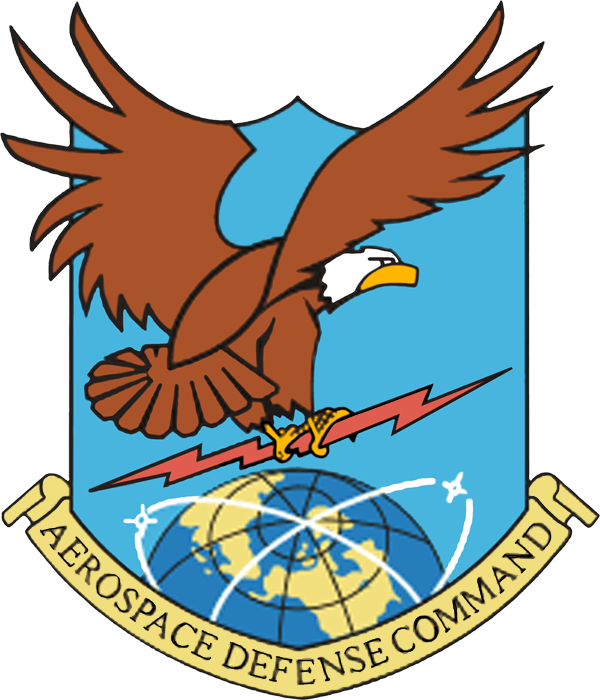
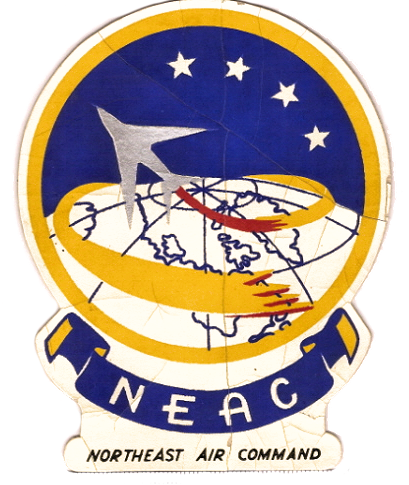

Site information
- Type: Military Naval Base
- Owner: Department of Defence
- Operator: United States Navy; 1941 – 1994

Location
- Location in Newfoundland
- Coordinates: 47°18′22″N 053°59′24″W

Site history
- Built: 1941
- Built by: United States Navy
- In use: 1941–1994

Garrison information
- Garrison: Aerospace Defense Command; Northeast Air Command
- Occupants: Royal Navy; Sound Surveillance System

Airfield information
- Identifiers: IATA: NWP
- Elevation: 50 ft (15 m) AMSL
Runways
| Direction | Length and surface |
|---|---|
| 04/22 | 7,400 ft (2,300 m) Asphalt concrete |
| 14/32 | 5,000 ft (1,500 m) Asphalt concrete |
| 08/26 | 5,100 ft (1,600 m) Asphalt concrete |

Naval Station Argentia (IATA: NWP) is a former base of the United States Navy that operated from 1941 to 1994. It was established in the community of Argentia in the Dominion of Newfoundland, which later became the tenth Canadian province, Newfoundland and Labrador.

== Construction ==
Established under the British-US destroyers for bases agreement of 1940, the base was first occupied on 25 January 1941 following the expropriation of the flat headland formed by a small natural bay called Little Placentia Sound and the western end facing Placentia Bay by the Newfoundland government; over 400 families were displaced.

Civilian construction crews from civilian contractors George A. Fuller Company and Merritt-Chapman and Scott Corporation, rushed to build the base as well as an adjoining air field. On 15 July 1941, the Naval Operating Base was commissioned. On 12 October 1942 the 17th Naval Construction Battalion began to arrive at the base and worked jointly with the civilians until 5 May 1943. At that time it became a completely military operation. Before that happened the 64th CB started to arrive in March followed by the 69th CB in June. On 17 November 1943, Construction Battalion Maintenance Units (CBMUs) 525 and 526 arrived to take over the station maintenance with the CB's having completed the base's construction.

== Atlantic Conference ==
On 7 August 1941 the heavy cruiser USS Augusta carrying U.S. President Franklin D. Roosevelt arrived in the anchorage at Little Placentia Bay off the base. Roosevelt inspected the base construction progress and did some fishing from Augusta over the next two days. Augusta was joined by the British warship HMS Prince of Wales carrying British Prime Minister Winston Churchill on 9 August 1941. While in the Argentia anchorage from 9–12 August, the chiefs of staff of Britain and the U.S. met to discuss war strategies and logistics once the U.S. joined in the war. The two leaders and their aides also negotiated the wording of a press release that they called a "joint statement". That press release was issued on 14 August 1941 in Washington, D.C., and was issued simultaneously in London, England. Several days later the Daily Herald would characterize the public statement as being the Atlantic Charter. The conference concluded the evening of 12 August 1941 with the British and American warships and their escorts passing in review before departing the area for their home ports. The joint declaration was publicly announced on 14 August, presumably after Prince of Wales had returned to UK waters.

== Second World War operations ==
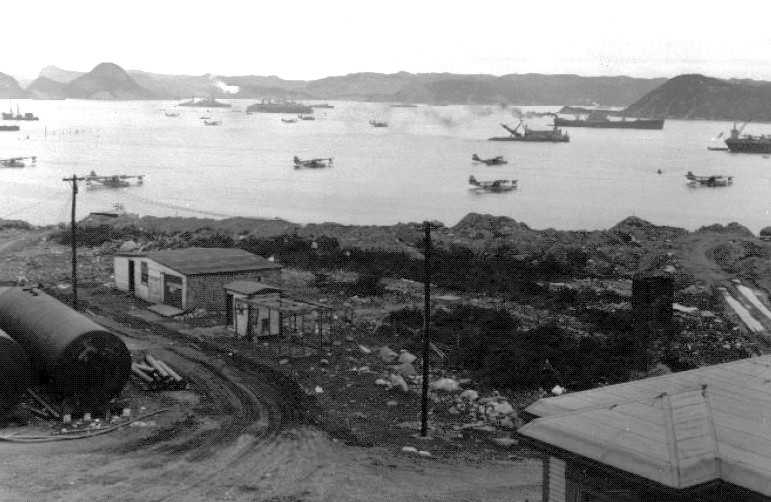
U.S. ships and aircraft in Little Placentia Sound, 1942

On 28 August 1941 Naval Air Station Argentia was commissioned. NAS Argentia was built on the plateau atop the triangular peninsula adjacent to Naval Station Argentia's anchorage and shore facilities. The air station was used to base convoy protection, coastal patrol and anti-submarine aircraft, both land-based aircraft and seaplanes. While NAS Argentia was nominally an independent facility from Naval Station Argentia, both facilities are largely viewed as one.

Beginning that summer, USS Prairie was used to house Flag Headquarters at the base.

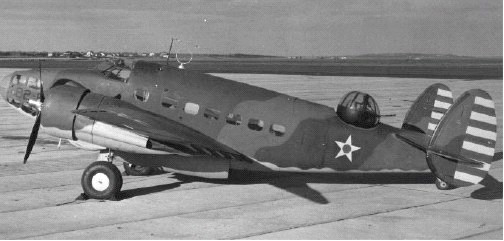
A PBO-1 Hudson of VP-82 at NAS Argentia in early 1942

February 1942 saw the Argentia base at the centre of one of the worst accidental disasters in the US Navy's history when USS Pollux and USS Truxtun grounded and were lost with heavy casualties 75 mi (121 km) southwest of the base. Over 100 victims were buried in Argentia's military cemetery.

United States Army Coast Artillery Corps troops were first deployed to Argentia in early 1941, at first a single coast defence battery with two or four 155 mm guns and an anti-aircraft battery. In January 1942 construction began on two batteries of 6-inch guns, and in March 1942 the United States Army established Fort McAndrew at Argentia to provide security to the navy base through an anti-aircraft battery and additional coast defence guns. Later that spring the Royal Navy established a small maintenance base at Argentia to service its ships involved in convoy escort groups operating out of Halifax, Sydney, St. John's and in the Gulf of Saint Lawrence.

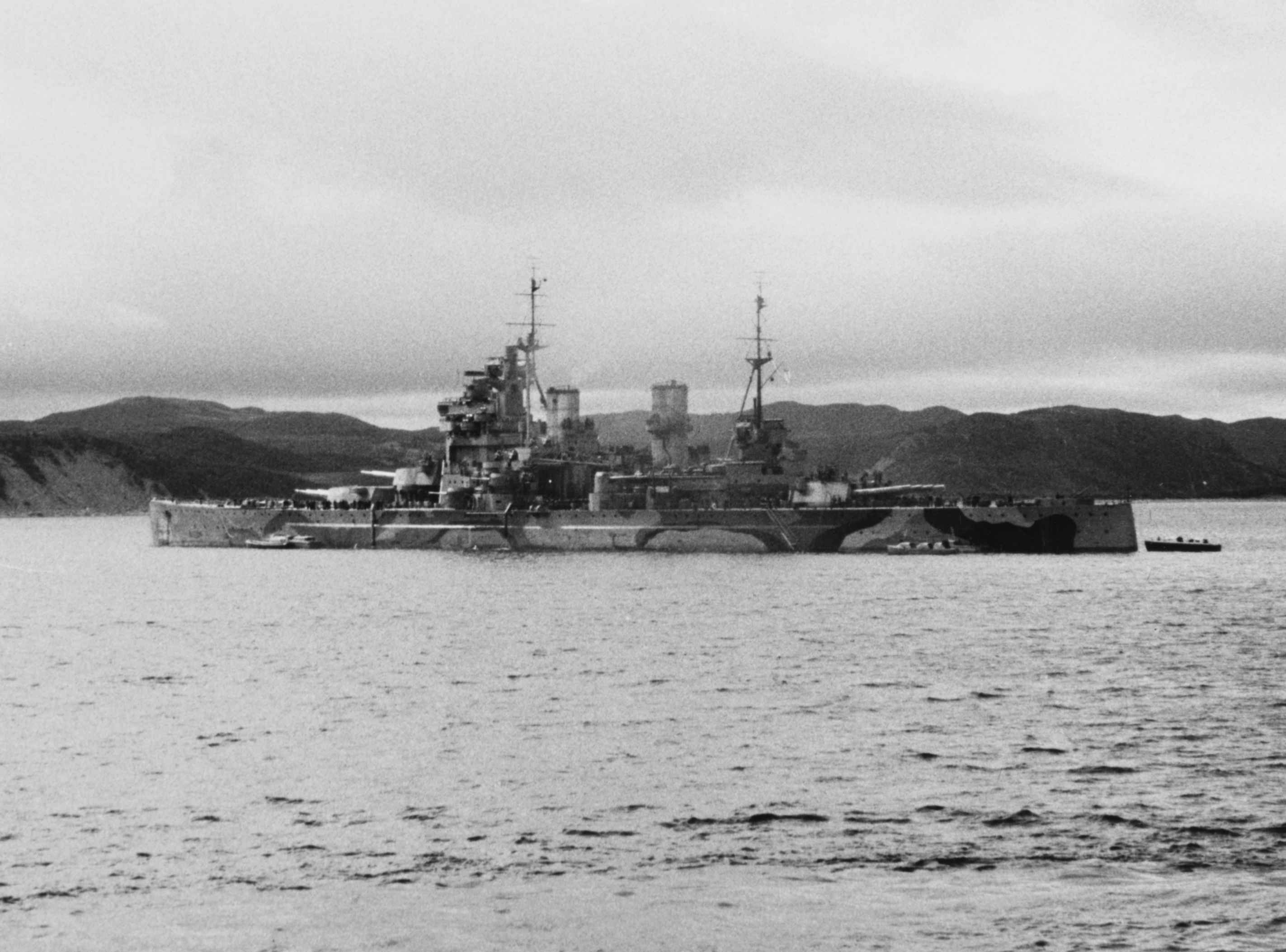
HMS Prince of Wales at NAS Argentia in 1941

A US Navy-staffed indicator loop station (Station 1X) was at Argentia; this detected submarines via their magnetic signature.

In the spring of 1943 a 7,000 ton floating drydock was installed at Argentia, along with a ship repair facility. In August 1943, Task Force 24 Flag Headquarters moved ashore to permanent facilities after having been housed aboard USS Prairie.

In 1944, Argentia served as one of the two stopover bases for the refuelling, maintenance, and crew changes of the six United States Navy (USN) K-class blimps that made the first transatlantic crossings of non-rigid airships. Blimps K-123 and K-130 from USN Blimp Squadron 14 (also known as ZP-14, Blimpron 14, or "The Africa Squadron") left South Weymouth Naval Air Station in Massachusetts on 28 May 1944 and landed at Argentia about 16 hours later. The two K-ships then flew for approximately 22 hours to Lages Field on Terceira Island in the Azores, the second stopover base for the transatlantic flights. The last leg was a ~20-hour flight to the squadron's final destination with Fleet Air Wing (FAW) 15 at Port Lyautey, French Morocco (now Kenitra, Morocco). Blimps K-123 and K-130 were followed by K-109 and K-134 then K-112 and K-101 which left South Weymouth on 11 and 27 June, respectively, in 1944. These six blimps initially conducted nighttime anti-submarine warfare operations to complement the daytime missions flown by FAW-15 aircraft (PBYs and PB4Y-2) using magnetic anomaly detection to locate U-boats in the relatively shallow waters around the Strait of Gibraltar. Later, ZP-14 K-ships conducted minespotting and minesweeping operations in key Mediterranean ports and various escort missions including that of the convoy carrying Franklin Roosevelt and Winston Churchill to the Yalta Conference in early 1945. In late April 1945, K-89 and K-114 left NAS Weeksville (now Coast Guard Air Station Elizabeth City) in North Carolina and flew a southern route to NAS Bermuda, the Azores, and Port Lyautey, where they arrived on 1 May 1945.

=== RN Air Section Argentia ===
The Royal Navy established an Air Section in May 1943 at Naval Air Station Argentia. It was created to maintain a reserve pool of torpedo bombers intended to support escort carriers engaged in North Atlantic convoy operations during World War II. The air section was formed to store and maintain up to twelve Fairey Swordfish torpedo bombers. These aircraft were held in reserve for possible use as replacement airframes for squadrons operating from escort carriers assigned to North Atlantic convoy protection. The facility was also equipped to accommodate and support a single disembarked Fleet Air Arm squadron if required.

The unit was commanded by E.W. Kenton, a Lieutenant Commander(A) in the Royal Naval Volunteer Reserve, and the air section was borne on the books of HMS Avalon III. It functioned as a logistical node for the transfer and management of aircraft within the Royal Navy’s North American Fleet Air Arm support network. Aircraft were issued to and received from RN Air Section Dartmouth at RCAF Station Dartmouth, Halifax and RN Air Section Yarmouth at RCAF Station Yarmouth, both located in Halifax and Yarmouth respectively.

Records indicate that six Fairey Swordfish aircraft were stationed at Argentia during 1943. These aircraft were later issued to 745 Naval Air Squadron at RCAF Station Yarmouth. Only one Fleet Air Arm squadron is recorded as having operated ashore at Argentia. 816 Naval Air Squadron, from the Attacker-class escort carrier HMS Tracker, was temporarily disembarked between 14 November and 12 December 1943 while the carrier underwent repairs at the United States Navy's Norfolk Naval Shipyard.

RN Air Section Argentia was officially withdrawn and disbanded on 5 July 1944.

=== Aerodrome ===
In approximately 1942 the aerodrome was listed as USAAF Aerodrome - Argentia, Newfoundland at 47°19′N 53°58′W with a variation of 29 degrees west and elevation of 50 ft (15 m). The field was listed as "all hard surfaced" and had three runways listed as follows:

| Runway name | Length | Width | Surface |
|---|---|---|---|
| 7/25 | 5,000 ft (1,500 m) | 300 ft (91 m) | Hard surfaced |
| 12/30 | 5,000 ft (1,500 m) | 300 ft (91 m) | Hard surfaced |
| 17/35 | 5,000 ft (1,500 m) | 300 ft (91 m) | Hard surfaced |

== Fort McAndrew ==
Fort McAndrew
- Placentia in Dominion of Newfoundland
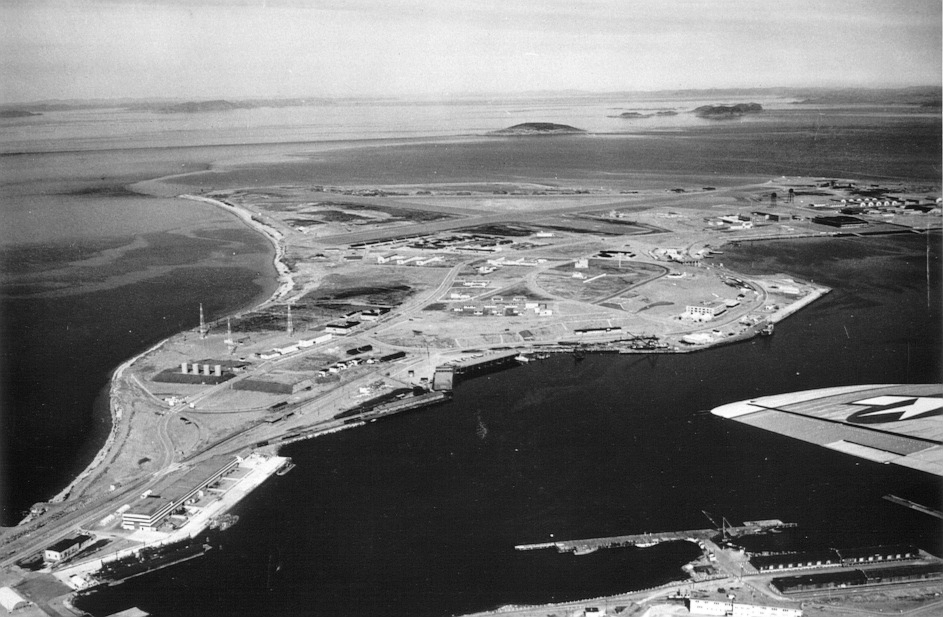

Site information
- Type: Army Base
- Owner: Department of War
- Operator: United States Army; 1941 – 1946

Site history
- Built: 1941
- Built by: United States Army
- In use: 1941–1994
- Fate: Transferred to U.S. Army Air Forces in 1946

Garrison information
- Garrison: United States Army
- Occupants: US Army Coast Artillery Corps; 24th Coast Artillery; 53rd Coast Artillery; 62nd Coast Artillery; 422d Signal Battalion

6-inch gun M1905 from Fort McAndrew on shielded barbette carriage at Fort Columbia State Park, Washington state

United States Army Coast Artillery Corps troops were first deployed to Argentia in January 1941, initially Battery A of the 57th Coast Artillery (Tractor Drawn) (TD) Regiment with two or possibly four mobile 155 mm guns, and Battery B of the 62nd Coast Artillery (Anti-aircraft) (AA) Regiment. A command known as the Harbor Defenses of Argentia and St. John's was established at this time to coordinate US coast defence activities in Newfoundland, under the Newfoundland Base Command. On 20 July 1941 the 155 mm gun battery was redesignated as Battery A, 53rd Coast Artillery (TD) Regiment, and on 1 August 1941 (some sources 1942) the AA battery was redesignated as Battery A, 421st CA (AA) Battalion (Separate). After the US entered the war following the attack on Pearl Harbor on 7 December 1941, construction on two batteries (Batteries 281 and 282) of two 6-inch guns each began in January 1942 and was completed in October 1942. These guns were on shielded long-range carriages with reinforced concrete and earth bunkers housing magazines and fire control equipment. On 16 February 1942 the harbour defence units in Newfoundland were redesignated as components of the 24th Coast Artillery (Harbor Defense) (Composite) Regiment, the headquarters and two additional batteries of which arrived at Fort McAndrew from the US on 25 March 1942. In April 1942 the AA defences were strengthened with the arrival of the 422nd CA Battalion (AA).

By the end of 1942 the coast defence gun batteries in the Argentia area were as follows:

| Name | No. of guns | Gun type | Carriage type | Location |
|---|---|---|---|---|
| Battery 281 | 2 | 6-inch gun M1905 | shielded barbette | 47°17′26″N 53°58′46″W |
| Battery 282 | 2 | 6-inch gun M1905 | shielded barbette | 47°16′25″N 53°59′22″W |
| Battery 954 | 2 | 6"/50 caliber gun (Navy Mark 8) | pedestal | 47°16′43″N 54°00′08″W |
| Battery 604 | 2 | 6"/50 caliber gun (Navy Mark 8) | pedestal | 47°18′51″N 54°00′16″W |
| Unnamed | 2 | 155 mm gun | towed on Panama mounts | Unknown |
| Anti-Motor Torpedo Boat Battery (AMTB) Roche Point | 4 | 90 mm gun | 2 fixed, 2 mobile | 47°19′02″N 53°58′41″W |
| AMTB Ship Harbour Point | 4 | 90 mm gun | 2 fixed, 2 mobile | 47°21′09″N 53°55′36″W |
| Battery 955 | 2 | 3-inch gun | pedestal | 47°19′21″N 53°56′59″W |
| Battery AMTB - Black Point | 2 | 90 mm gun M1/M2/M3 | pedestal | 47°11′40″N 54°02′25″W |

In March 1943 the 24th CA Regiment was reduced to a battalion. In December 1943-January 1944 elements of the unit returned to the US for inactivation. In October 1944 the unit was reorganized, but was not fully inactivated until 8 September 1945. The date the unit was transferred to the US for inactivation is unclear. Postwar, circa 1946 the coast defence batteries were inactivated. The 6-inch guns of Batteries 281 and 282 survive. Battery 282's guns are still in place, and in 1993 Battery 281's guns were moved to Fort Columbia in Washington state, US.

== Cold War operations ==
Following the war's end in August 1945, the first dependents of naval personnel were permitted to move to Argentia to live in permanent quarters on base.

In 1946, Fort McAndrew was transferred to the U.S. Army Air Forces which became the United States Air Force in 1947. In 1948, Fort McAndrew was renamed McAndrew Air Force Base.

In 1949, Newfoundland joined the Canadian Confederation as the 10th province. During the Cold War, Argentia Naval Station became a key "node" in the Northwest Atlantic's SOSUS network, helping to detect Soviet nuclear submarines. During that period an atypical SOSUS system was installed in 1959 to provide surveillance for approaches to Hudson Bay. It was a shallow water, curved array with ten eight-element arrays installed on two cables with each cable having the capacity for the usual forty elements. The base was the target of several espionage attempts between the 1940s–1990s as a result.

In 1955 McAndrew AFB was decommissioned and the facility was turned over to the US Navy with USAF personnel moving to other locations in Newfoundland such as Ernest Harmon AFB, Goose AFB or various radar installations being built in conjunction with the Royal Canadian Air Force such as the Pinetree Line, Mid-Canada Line and Distant Early Warning Line. Associated with the DEW Line, radar picket ships such as USS Hissem used the base, and Lockheed WV-2 Warning Star aircraft used the airfield. These ships and aircraft were called Barrier Force Atlantic (BARLANT) and operated from 1955 through 1965.

In 1959 the Navy deployed a portable Transit tracking station at the station, which recorded the doppler data from the 24-minute flight of the Transit 1A satellite launched on 17 September 1959. An ionospheric refraction value was calculated using the doppler data recovered by the portable station, and a correction factor was then applied to the data to produce a doppler curve unaffected by ionospheric refraction. The Satellite 1-A trajectory thus determined was in close agreement with range track data.

In 1959 the United States Naval Facility (NAVFAC) Argentia was established as a Sound Surveillance System (SOSUS) shore terminal. The next year NAVFAC Argentia was terminus for an atypical SOSUS shallow water system designated King Shallow Water composed of ten eight-element arrays, twice the usual forty element deep water arrays. The shallow water system was intended to monitor Soviet patrols into Hudson Bay. In 1963 the first 2x20 array was installed terminating at NAVFAC Argentia. The shallow water system was deactivated in 1968.

Between 1968 and 1994 the United States stored the Mk 101 Lulu and B57 nuclear bombs at Naval Station Argentia.

== Closure ==
In 1972 NAVFAC became a joint operations station for the US Navy and the Canadian Forces but Naval Air Station Argentia was decommissioned and the land transferred in 1975 to the Government of Canada. It was subsequently transferred to the provincial government for development. On 30 September 1994 the US Navy left Argentia completely when NAVFAC Argentia was decommissioned (Canadian operations were transferred to Canadian Forces IUSS Centre in Halifax) and the last personnel moved out.

Until 1994, the runways of the former airfield were utilized by the Royal Canadian Air Cadets. The Air Cadets operated weekend glider familiarization through the Air Cadet Gliding Program. The Schweizer SGS 2-33 was launched using an auto-tow launch method, utilizing the entire length of the runway surfaces. Personnel were housed at the Naval Station Argentia facilities. After the US Naval Station was decommissioned, the glider program was operated without facilities support until the airfield was occupied in 2004 for a Hydrometallurgy Demonstration Plant by INCO. With the announcement that the INCO development would not be using the airfield, the Air Cadet Gliding Program once again started using the airfield for gliding operations in May 2008.

== See also ==
- US Naval Advance Bases

== Bibliography ==
- Ballance, Theo; Howard, Lee; Sturtivant, Ray (2016). The Squadrons and Units of the Fleet Air Arm. Air Britain Historians Limited. ISBN 978-0-85130-489-2.
- Gaines, William C., Coast Artillery Organizational History, 1917-1950, Coast Defense Journal, vol. 23, issue 2
- Hein, David. "Vulnerable: HMS Prince of Wales in 1941." Journal of Military History 77, no. 3 (July 2013): 955–989.
- Stanton, Shelby L. (1991). World War II Order of Battle. Galahad Books. ISBN 0-88365-775-9.
- Staff writer (c. 1942). Pilots Handbook of Aerodromes and Seaplane Bases Vol. 1. Royal Canadian Air Force.
