= CFS St. John's =

Canadian Forces Garrison in Newfoundland and Labrador

Garrison St. John's
- Part of Maritime Forces Atlantic
- St. John's, Newfoundland, Canada

Site information
- Type: Navy base
- Owner: Department of National Defence
- Operator: Royal Canadian Navy; 1949 – present
- Controlled by: Canadian Armed Forces

Location
- Location on Newfoundland
- Coordinates: 47.583°N 52.694°W

Site history
- Built: 1941
- Built by: United States Army
- In use: 1941 – present
- Battles/wars: Battle of the Atlantic

Garrison information
- Garrison: Royal Canadian Navy; Maritime Forces Atlantic
- Occupants: 5th Canadian Division; Royal Newfoundland Regiment

Garrison St. John's, formerly known as and commonly referred to as CFS St. John's, is a Canadian Forces Garrison in St. John's, Newfoundland and Labrador.

Garrison St. John's is on the north shore of Quidi Vidi Lake on part of the former site of Pepperrell Air Force Base, as well as a small adjunct area on St. John's Harbour. The garrison supports all military activities in Newfoundland as well as local reserve units; CFS St. John's has 15 lodger units and supports 450 full-time military and civilian personnel. It also indirectly supports 1,500 reservists in Newfoundland and Labrador, as well as 5,000 cadets.

In its primary role, Garrison St. John's supports naval vessels of Maritime Forces Atlantic which patrol waters off Newfoundland and Labrador. The station also supports as many as 30 visiting NATO naval vessels each year.

It also provided direct support to HMCS Avalon, a sea cadet facility, as well as the Royal Newfoundland Regiment, 37 Combat Engineer Regiment, 37 Service Battalion, Air Reserve Flight Torbay and the Naval Reserve Division HMCS Cabot.

On 21 June 2014, the new Surgeon Lieutenant-Commander W. Anthony Paddon Building was opened, which houses those personnel attached to the station, replacing 17 older buildings. The new building is in the Pleasantville area. The initial land purchase took place in 2007, when the Department of National Defence bought 2.6 hectares (6.4 acres) of land. Initially the cost of the new building was forecast as $101 million; however, after seven years, the actual cost came out to $156 million. The building is named for William Anthony Paddon, a former lieutenant governor of Newfoundland.
