= 53rd Coast Artillery Regiment =

Inactive US army unit

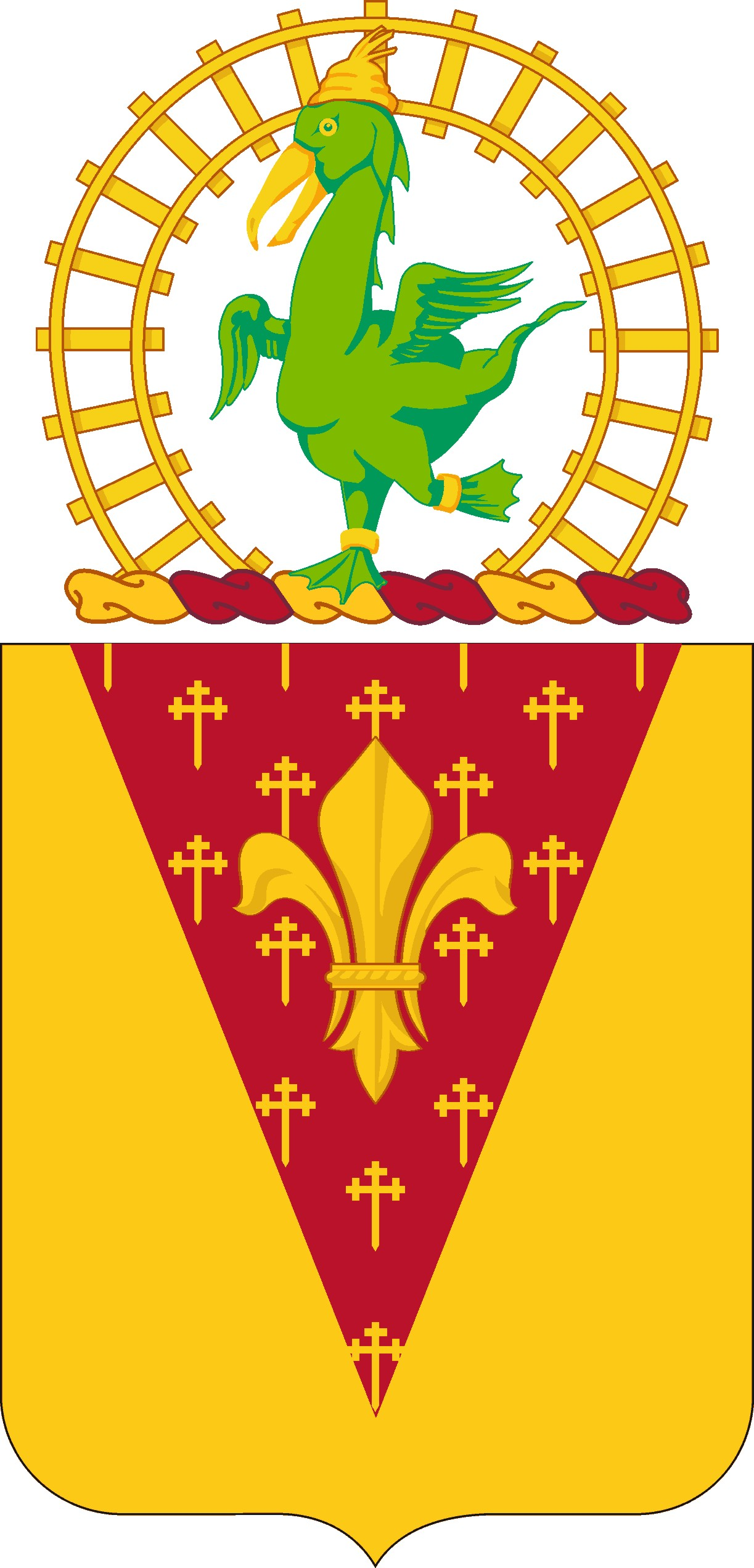
- Coat of arms
- Active: 1917-1944
- Country: United States
- Branch: Army
- Type: Coast artillery
- Role: Railway
- Size: Regiment
- Motto: "Je Frappe" (I Strike)
- Mascot: Oozlefinch
- Engagements: World War I

Commanders
- Notable commanders: Colonel George T. Perkins

The 53rd Coast Artillery Regiment was a Coast Artillery regiment in the United States Army. In World War I it was a railway artillery regiment in France. In World War II it was reactivated with mobile 155 mm guns.

== History ==
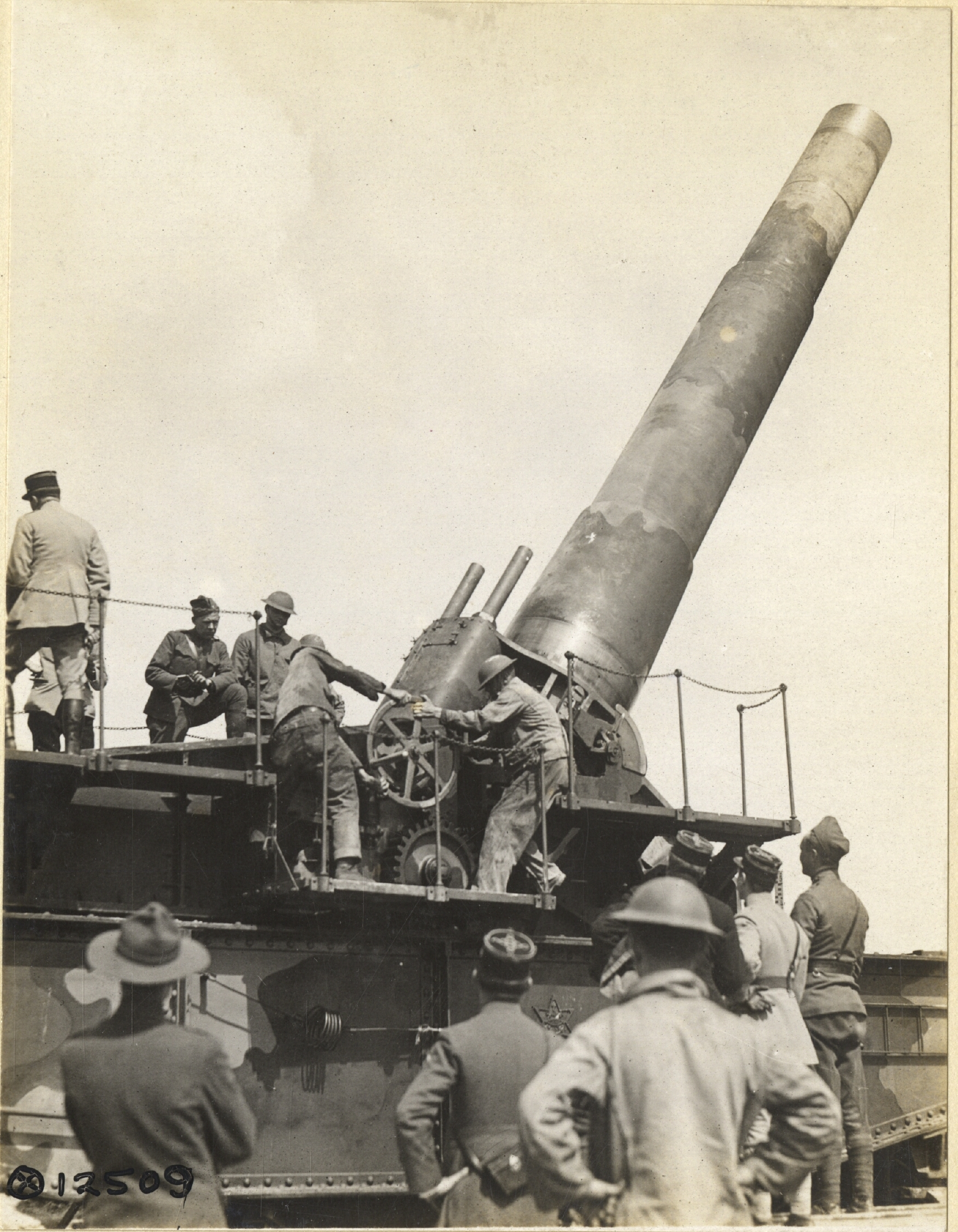
A mle 1915/1916 in service with US Army 53rd Coast Artillery, 15 May 1918

.

- for WW.I. history with Railway guns see Obusier_de_400_Modèle_1915/1916#United_States_service
- for 1917 see Archibald_H._Sunderland#World_War_I
- for 1941 see Naval_Station_Argentia#Fort_McAndrew
- for 1942 see Pepperrell_Air_Force_Base#Wartime_operations
- for 1942 see Bermuda_Base_Command#US_Army_ground_forces_in_Bermuda

== Lineage ==
Constituted in July 1917, under the designation of the 8th Provisional Regiment, Coast Artillery Corps at Fort Adams from the following companies:

- Headquarters and Supply Companies were the 5th Company, Fort Monroe, VA and Fort Story, VA. (Originally the 118th Co.)
- Battery A was the 1st, 2nd, 3rd, 4th, Company Fort Howard, Md. and 1st Company from Fort Smallwood.
- Battery B was the 10th Company at Fort Monroe, VA.
- Battery C was the 12th Company at Fort Monroe, VA.
- Battery D was the 11th Company at Fort Monroe, VA.
- Battery E was the 3rd Company at Fort Wadsworth, NY. (Originally the 114th Co.)
- Battery F was the 3rd Company Fort Hamilton, NY. (Originally the 84th Co.)
- Battery G was the 3rd Company from Fort Tilden
- Battery H was the 3rd Company Fort Moultrie, SC. (Originally the 78th Co.)
- Battery I was the 1st and 2nd Companies from Fort Hunt
- Battery K was the 1st 2nd 3rd 4th 5th Companies from Fort Washington
- Battery L was the 2nd Company Fort Caswell, NC. (Originally the 31st Co.)
- Battery M was the 2nd Company at Fort Screven, GA.

Arrived in France 25 September 1917 and redesignated as the 53rd Artillery (Coast Artillery Corps) on 5 February 1918. (In August 1918 the Railway Artillery Reserve was reconstructed and Coast Artillery Regiments reorganized to conform to standardized Field Artillery configurations)

- HHB as HHB
- Battery A as Battery A 53rd Artillery CAC
- Battery B as Battery B 53rd Artillery CAC
- Battery C as Battery C 53rd Artillery CAC
- Battery D as Battery D 53rd Artillery CAC
- Battery E transferred to Provisional Howitzer Regiment, then to 51st Artillery CAC as Battery E
- Battery F transferred to 42nd Artillery CAC as Battery F
- Battery G transferred to Provisional Howitzer Regiment, then to 51st Artillery CAC as Battery F
- Battery H transferred to 42nd Artillery CAC as Battery E
- Battery I transferred to 52nd Artillery CAC as Battery E
- Battery K transferred to 52nd Artillery CAC as Battery F
- Battery L as E Battery 53rd Artillery CAC
- Battery M as F Battery 53rd Artillery CAC

Arrived from France at Newport News, Virginia 11 March 1919 proceeded to Camp Stuart, Virginia then reassigned to Camp Eustis 17 and 18 March 1919.

- Inactivated 1 August 1921 at Camp Eustis
- Redesignated as 53rd Coast Artillery (RY) Regiment on 1 July 1924 (inactive)
- Demobilized in 1930
- Constituted as 53rd Coast Artillery (155mm Gun) on 9 July 1941

Activated on 20 July 1942 with personnel from Batteries HHB and E of 13th Coast Artillery at Camp Pendleton, Virginia.

- Battery A from A Battery 57th Coast artillery, at Newfoundland
- Battery B from B Battery 57th Coast artillery, at Bermuda
- Battery C from ??, at Goat Island, Jamaica
  - A, B and C Batteries transferred back to Camp Pendleton less personnel and equipment and reactivated
- Battery D at Camp Pendleton
- Battery E at Camp Pendleton
- Battery F at Camp Pendleton
- Battery G (SL) from Battery G 57th Coast Artillery at Fort DuPont
- Battery H activated but 20 February 1942 inactivated and transferred to 27th Coast Artillery Battalion

On 16 October 1942 assigned to Eastern Defense Command.

- On 3 August 1943 53rd Artillery CAC reconstituted and consolidated with 53rd Coast Artillery (155mm Gun).

Regiment deactivated and broken up on 27 May 1944 at Camp Pendleton as follows-

- HHB as 153rd Coast Artillery Group
- 1st Battalion redesignated 290th Coast Artillery Battalion
- 2nd Battalion redesignated 291st Coast Artillery Battalion
- 3rd Battalion redesignated 292nd Coast Artillery Battalion
- Battery G inactivated and disbanded 5 June 1944

== Coat of arms ==
=== Blazon ===
- Shield

Or, on a pile Gules crusily fitchy of the field a fleur-de-lis of the like.

- Crest

On a wreath of the colors Or and Gules, an oozlefinch Vert, beaked, capped and collared on legs Or, in front of an epie of the last. Motto JE FRAPPE (I Strike).

=== Symbolism ===
- Shield

The regiment had its baptism of fire at Royammeix, France, near Commercy and was in St. Mihiel (also near Commercy) and the Meuse-Argonne operations near Verdun, all being in the province of Lorraine. The shield is gold as in the arms of Lorraine. The red pile is for artillery, scattered with cross crosslets fitchy from the arms of Commercy and charged with one gold fleur-de-lis from the arms of Verdun.

- Crest

The oozlefinch and epie in the crest are both taken from the shoulder sleeve insignia worn by Railway Artillery Reserve, of which this regiment was a unit.

=== Background ===
The coat of arms was approved on 5 March 1929.

There was no distinctive unit insignia approved for this unit.

== Campaign streamers ==
unknown

== Decorations ==
unknown
