= 8-inch Mk. VI railway gun =

8-inch Mk.VI M3A2 railway gun
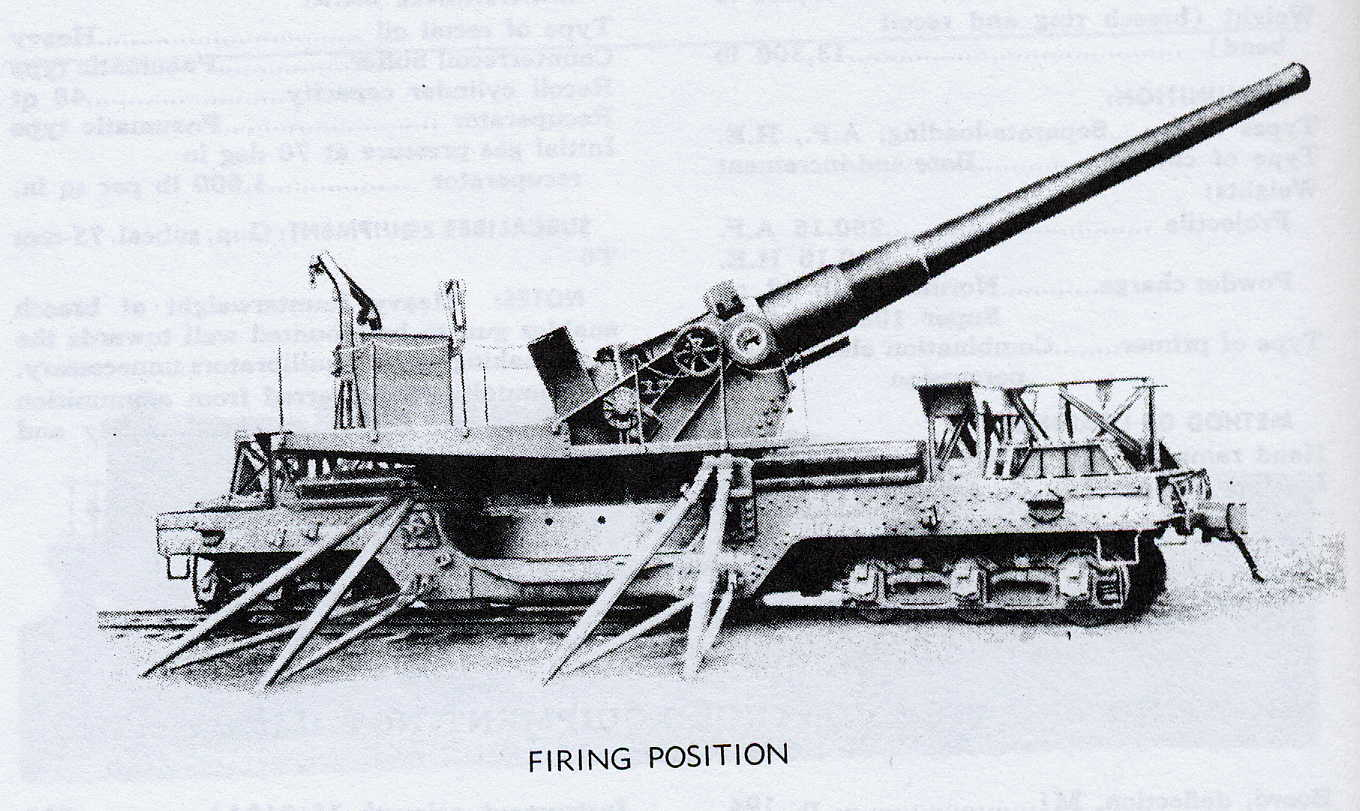
- 8-inch Mk.VI M3A2 railway gun
- Type: Railway gun
- Place of origin: United States

Service history
- In service: 1941–1946
- Used by: United States
- Wars: World War II

Production history
- Manufacturer: Baldwin Locomotive Works (railway carriage)
- Produced: 1941
- No. built: 32? railway version, 16 fixed barbette mounts

Specifications
- Mass: tube and breech: 42,000 lb (19,000 kg) complete railway mount: 188,000 lb (85,000 kg)
- Length: tube and breech: 30 ft 9 in (9.37 m)
- Shell: separate loading HE and AP, 260 pounds (120 kg) AP
- Caliber: 8 inches (203 mm)
- Breech: Interrupted screw, step cut (Welin type)
- Recoil: Hydro-pneumatic
- Carriage: M1A1 railway
- Elevation: 45 degrees
- Traverse: 360 degrees
- Rate of fire: 2 rounds a minute
- Muzzle velocity: 2,750 ft/s (840 m/s) AP, or 2,840 ft/s (870 m/s) HE.
- Maximum firing range: 35,300 yd (32,300 m)
- Feed system: hand

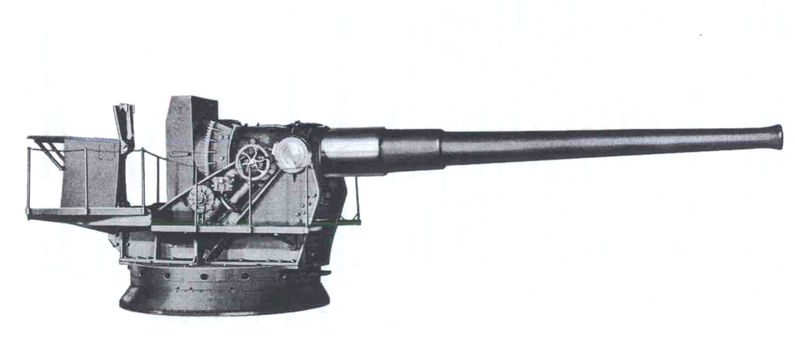
8-inch Navy MkVIM3 gun on barbette mount M1A1, as used by the Army in coast defense.

The 8-inch Navy gun Mk.VI M3A2 on railway mount M1A1 was a World War II improved replacement for the World War I-era 8-inch (203 mm) M1888 gun and was used by the US Army's Coast Artillery Corps in US harbor defenses. The guns were also mounted in fixed emplacements on the barbette carriage M1A1. These guns were US Navy surplus 8"/45 caliber guns from battleships scrapped under the 1922 Washington Naval Treaty. Mark VI (also Mark 6) was the Navy designation. The Army designation for this gun was "8-inch Navy gun Mk.VI M3A2".

== History ==
The ex-Navy Mark VI railway gun was quickly put together at the start of World War II, to supplement the older World War I 8-inch M1888 railway gun. It was developed from an experimental 12-inch (305 mm) railway howitzer carriage of World War I. The all-around rotating mount and outriggers were designed to allow the gun to track a moving target for coast defense. These guns had a very short life in Army use, entering service in February 1941 and being cut up for scrap immediately after the war. The guns were the Navy's 8-inch (203 mm)/45 caliber Mark VI, and were originally secondary armament on Virginia- and Connecticut-class battleships launched 1904-06 and scrapped in the 1920s. They were mounted in both fixed emplacements and on the M1A1 railway carriage.

=== Deployment ===
- Fixed two-gun batteries at Fort Church (Narragansett Bay, Rhode Island), Fort Rosecrans (San Diego, California), Fort Ruger and two other locations (Oahu, Hawaii) (two not completed), Fort Schwatka (Dutch Harbor, Alaska), Fort J. H. Smith and Fort Abercrombie (Kodiak, Alaska), Fort Segarra near St. Thomas in the United States Virgin Islands, and Roosevelt Roads, Puerto Rico (not armed).
- Railway guns: 8 at Fort Miles, Delaware, two 4-gun batteries each in the Los Angeles and Puget Sound harbor defenses and Fort John Custis near Cape Charles, Virginia, others at Fort Hancock, New Jersey (near New York City).

== Sighting and fire control equipment ==
The following sighting equipment was used with the gun.

- M1 Deflection board
- M1 fire adjustment board
- M1A1 Range correction board
- M3 Spotting board
- M1912 Clinometer
- M1 Percentage corrector
- M1A1 Height finder, or M2A1
- M6 Azmuth indicator
- M5 Elevation indicator
- M1910A1 Azmuth instrument
- M8 Helium filling kit
- M1 Gunners quadrant
- Type B, set forward rule
- M1 prediction scale
- bore site
- firing table, 8-I-1.
- M7 stereoscopic trainer
- M1 generating unit

== Support cars ==
- M2 fire control car
- M1 machine shop car
- modified box car for ammunition

== Surviving Examples ==
Four weapons of this type survive:

- One gun at Fort Miles, Delaware, on M1 railway proof mount (experimentally bored out to 9.12 in (232 mm)) (was previously at Naval Surface Warfare Center Dahlgren Division, Dahlgren, VA
- Two 8-inch Guns Mk VI M3A2 (#160L2 & #154L2), Battery 404, Fort Abercrombie, Kodiak, AK
- One 8-inch Gun Mk VI M3A2 (#134L2), Kodiak Airport, Kodiak, AK (gun formerly at Battery 403, Fort J.H. Smith, Kodiak, AK)

== See also ==
- List of U.S. Army weapons by supply catalog designation
- Railway gun
