= 8-inch gun M1888 =

8-inch M1888MIA1 railway gun
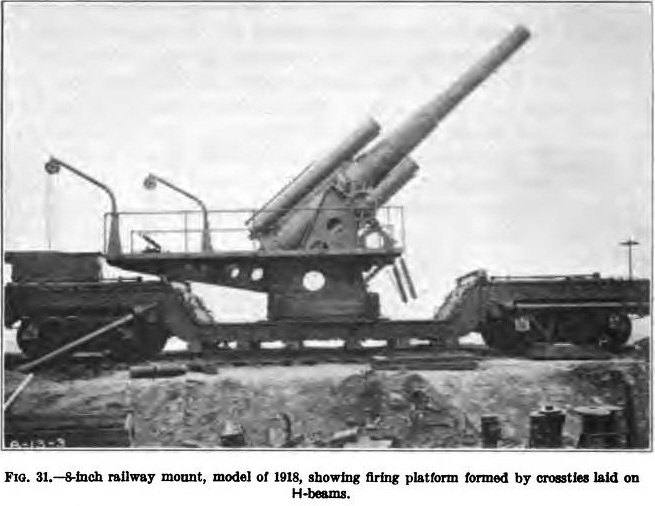
- 8-inch M1888MIA1 railway gun
- Type: Coast defense gun or Railway gun
- Place of origin: United States

Service history
- In service: 1898–1946
- Used by: United States
- Wars: World War I, World War II

Production history
- Designed: 1888
- Manufacturer: gun: usually Watervliet Arsenal, carriage: various, most designed by Watertown Arsenal
- No. built: At least 96 with about 75 deployed; 9 in fixed barbette emplacements, about 64 in disappearing emplacements, 37 or 47 on railway carriages (guns removed from fixed emplacements or storage)

Specifications
- Mass: 33,700 lb (15,300 kg)
- Length: railcar: 40 ft 6 in (12.34 m)
- Shell: separate loading, 260 pounds (120 kg) AP, 323 pounds (147 kg) AP shot & shell, 200 pounds (91 kg) HE
- Caliber: 8 inches (203 mm)
- Breech: Interrupted screw, De Bange type
- Recoil: Hydro-spring
- Carriage: M1892 barbette, M1894 and M1896 disappearing, M1918 barbette, M1918MI railway
- Elevation: Disappearing: +12° Railway: +42°
- Traverse: Disappearing: 120° Railway: 360°
- Maximum firing range: disappearing: 14,200 yards (13,000 m), railway: 23,900 yards (21,900 m)
- Feed system: hand

The 8-inch gun M1888 (203 mm) was a U.S. Army Coast Artillery Corps gun, initially deployed 1898–1908 in about 75 fixed emplacements, usually on a disappearing carriage. During World War I, 37 or 47 of these weapons (references vary) were removed from fixed emplacements or from storage to create a railway gun version, the 8-inch Gun M1888MIA1, Barbette carriage M1918 on railway car M1918MI, converted from the fixed coast defense mountings and used during World War I and World War II.

== History ==
The M1888 8 in (203 mm) gun was a coastal artillery gun initially deployed as part of the Endicott system of fortifications. The first nine were deployed on the M1892 barbette carriage in 1898, but the improved M1894 and M1896 disappearing carriages soon became available, and approximately 64 additional weapons were deployed on these carriages by 1908. An "emergency" converted Rodman carriage was also used during the Spanish–American War in 1898 to quickly arm 21 emplacements with the modern 8-inch M1888 gun. These weapons were redeployed soon after the war ended. The disappearing carriage allowed the gun to remain behind a parapet resembling a hillside most of the time, thus largely invulnerable to low-angle enemy fire, which was the only type of enemy attack anticipated 1898–1910. Air and high-angle artillery attack would eventually severely impact US fortifications in the Philippines in World War II.

Numerous additional weapons of other calibers including the 10-inch gun M1895, 12-inch gun M1895, and 12-inch coast defense mortars were also deployed in US coastal fortifications alongside the 8-inch guns. The 8-inch guns were deployed in the harbor defenses of Portland, Maine, Portsmouth, New Hampshire, New Bedford, Massachusetts, Long Island Sound, New York, Eastern New York, Southern New York, Delaware River, Baltimore, Maryland, Potomac River, Chesapeake Bay, Cape Fear River, North Carolina, Savannah, Georgia, Key West, Florida, Tampa Bay, Florida, Pensacola, Florida, Mobile, Alabama, Mississippi River, Galveston, Texas, San Francisco, California, Columbia River, and Puget Sound.

=== Railway mounting ===
After the American entry into World War I, the United States needed a medium-range heavy artillery piece that could be transported easily. The quick solution was to take the existing 8-inch coast artillery guns from the fixed mountings or from storage and mount them on a drop bed rail car. This was also done with a number of other weapons, including 10-inch (254 mm) guns, 12-inch (305 mm) guns, and 12-inch mortars. The 7-inch (178 mm) guns, 8-inch guns, and 12-inch mortars used a common carriage, with a depressed center and two 4-wheel or 6-wheel bogies. The bogies were interchangeable for standard gauge or (with 12-wheel bogies) 60 cm (23.6 in) gauge track. Outriggers and a rotating mount allowed all-around fire. This allowed the weapons to be used in coast defense against moving targets. (Note: A detailed description of the railway mounting is given in Railway Artillery, Vol. I by Lt. Col. H. W. Miller, USA.)

A total of 96 8-inch guns (reportedly including spare Navy Marks 1 through 4 as well as M1888 guns) were considered available for railway mounting, and 47 were ordered to be mounted on railcars. Twenty-four were produced before the Armistice, and three of these had been shipped to France by that time. These three and several 10-inch guns were the only US Army railway guns shipped to France in World War I, although five US Navy 14"/50 caliber railway guns (356 mm) saw action.

Since the railway weapons were on the M1918 carriage and railway car, some references erroneously refer to them as M1918 weapons.

All (or perhaps 37, references vary) of the 47 ordered were completed by the end of 1919 and the contract was cancelled at that point. Unlike almost all other US railway weapons, the 8-inch guns were widely deployed in the inter-war years, and by 1942 were augmented by 32 ex-Navy Mark VI guns. Approximately twelve M1888 guns were deployed for the defense of Oahu, Hawaii. Others were stationed for the coastal defense of Manila, eventually one each on Corregidor and Bataan (dismounted from the railway carriage), with batteries at Newfoundland, Bermuda, Puget Sound, Chesapeake Bay, Delaware River, and Fort Hancock, New Jersey (near New York City). Some 8-inch disappearing guns remained in fixed emplacements in the US until late in World War II, when they were scrapped as 16-inch guns and 6-inch guns on long-range mountings replaced all previous coast defense weapons.

=== Combat service ===
An anecdotal account of the 8-inch M1888 railway guns in the Japanese invasion of the Philippines in 1941–42 states that eight guns (another account says seven guns) were shipped to Manila in late 1940, as part of the Inland Seas Defense Project. Initially, difficulties were encountered because the railway carriages were 36-inch (914 mm) gauge and the Philippines used a 42-inch (1,067 mm) gauge. In late December 1941 all eight guns were sent north in one train to oppose the Japanese landings at Lingayen Gulf, but six guns were damaged beyond repair by enemy air attack.

The remaining two guns (possibly only one) were eventually shipped to Corregidor and Bataan by early March 1942, where they were mounted on improvised pedestal mounts. The account states that the one gun that information is available on fired only five proof rounds and sat idle for want of a crew until it was destroyed by air and/or artillery attack. One reference states that the other gun was mounted near Bagac, Bataan.

== Variations ==
Model	Size	Gun Length	Weight
M1888 Rifle	8 in (203.2 mm)	23 ft 2.5 in (7.07 m)	32,218 lb (14,614 kg)
M1888MI Rifle	8 in (203.2 mm)	23 ft 2.5 in (7.07 m)	32,218 lb (14,614 kg)
M1888MII Rifle	8 in (203.2 mm)	23 ft 2.5 in (7.07 m)	33,200 lb (15,059 kg)
MkVI-M3A2 Rifle	8 in (203.2 mm)	30 ft 9 in (9.37 m)	42,000 lb (19,051 kg)

== Components ==
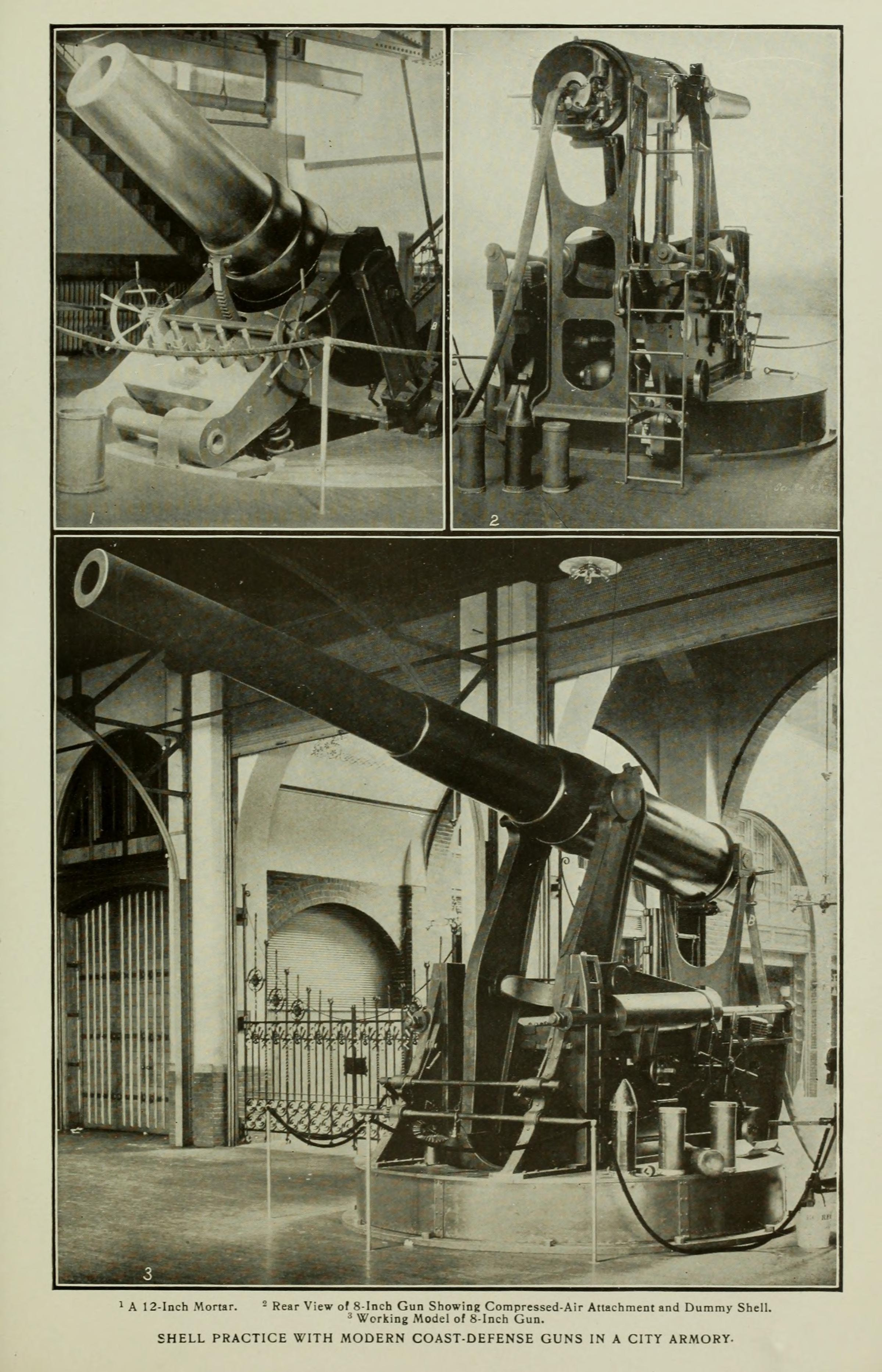
8-inch gun M1888 on disappearing carriage M1896. The weapon in the upper left is a 12-inch coast defense mortar M1890.

=== Sighting and fire control equipment ===
The following sighting equipment was used with the gun.

- M1 fire adjustment board
- M1A1 Range correction board
- M3 Spotting board
- M1912 Clinometer
- M1 Percentage corrector
- M1A1 Height finder, or M2A1
- M8 Helium filling kit
- M1 Gunners quadrant
- M1818 Aiming rule
- M1 prediction scale
- Bore site
- Firing table, 8-G-2
- M1923 Telescope
- M1922 Panoramic telescope

=== Support cars ===
- M1918 fire control car
- Ammunition car (modified box car)

== Gallery ==
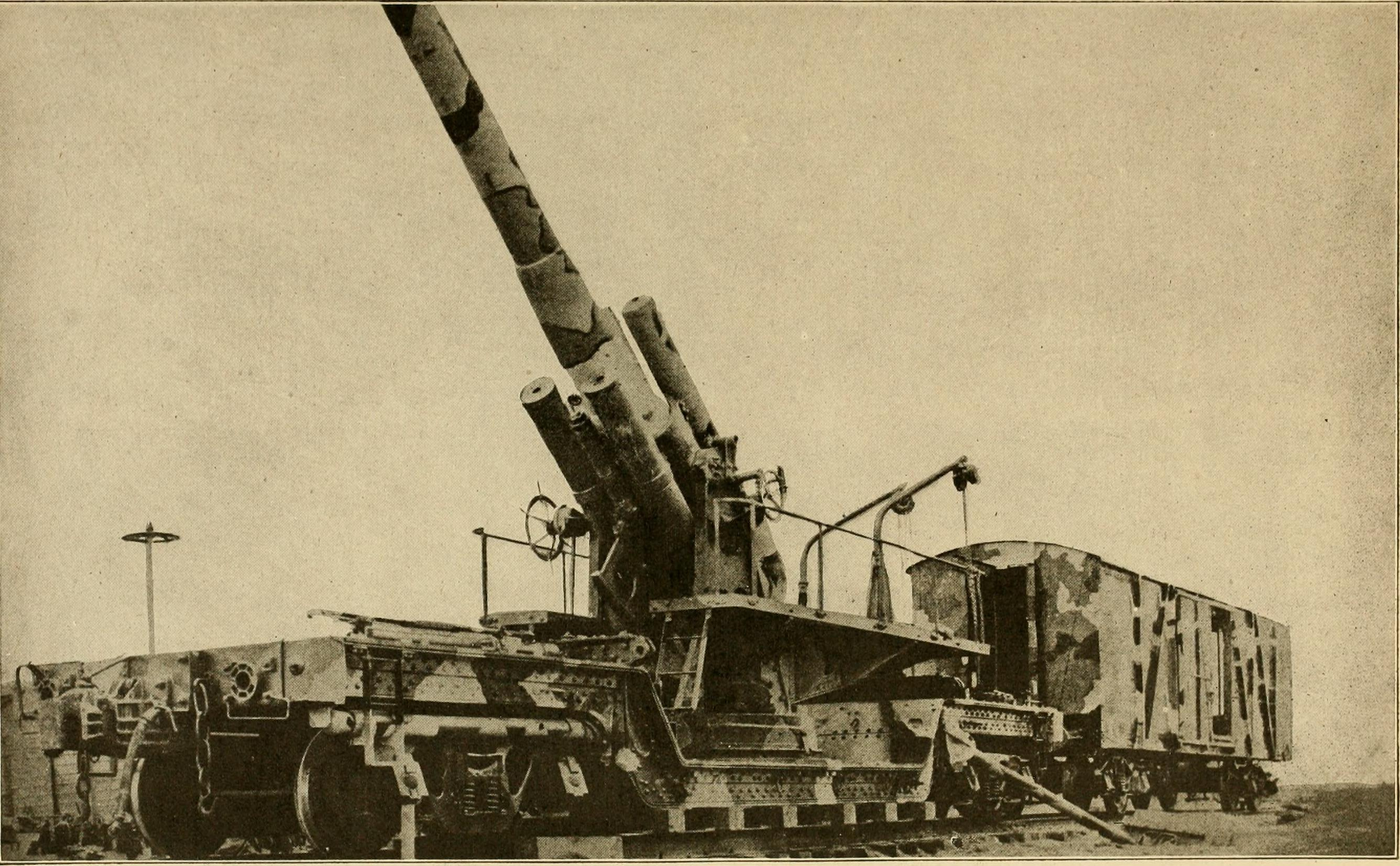
8-inch gun M1888 on carriage M1918, camouflaged with ammunition wagon. Original caption indicates it may be one of three weapons delivered to France in World War I.

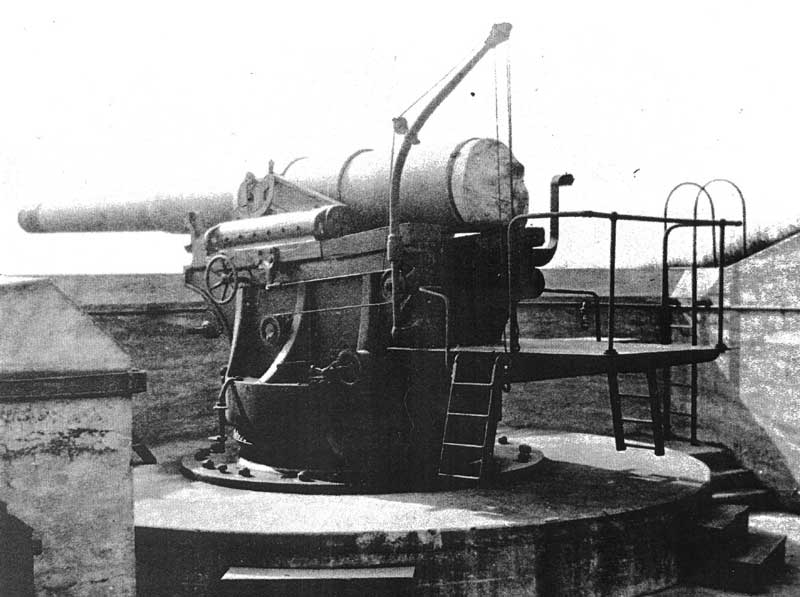
8-inch gun M1888 on barbette carriage M1892; these preceded the disappearing carriage in US service.

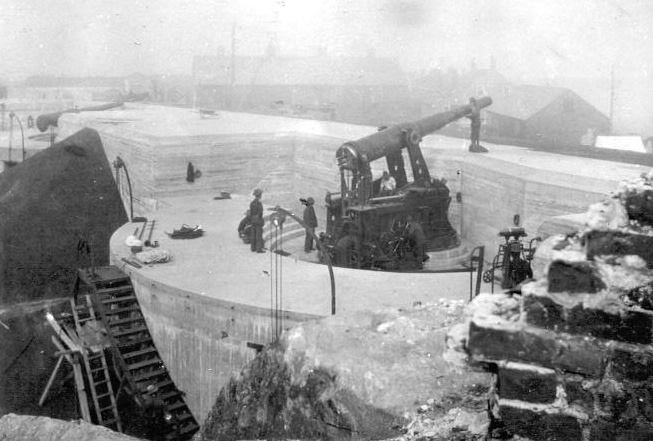
8-inch gun M1888 on disappearing carriage M1894, Fort Constitution, New Hampshire.

== Surviving examples ==
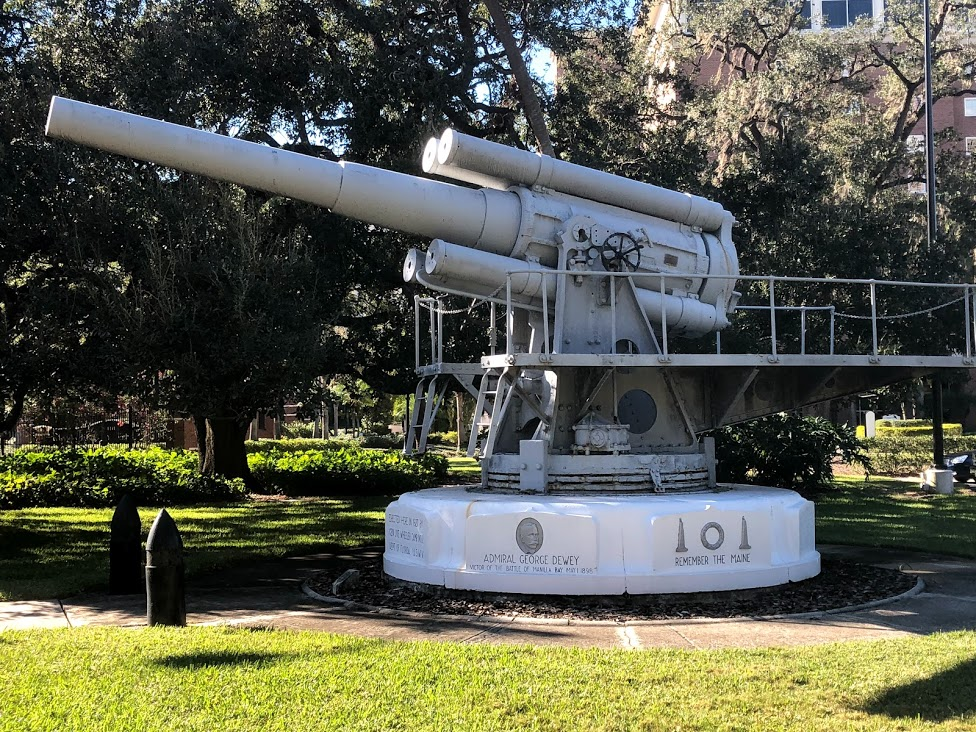
Spanish–American War Memorial, Plant Park, University of Tampa, Tampa, Florida. 8-inch M1888MIA1 No. 32 Watervliet, railroad gun originally from Battery Bowyer, Fort Morgan, Alabama.

- One 8-inch Gun M1888MIA1 (#32 Watervliet) on Barbette Carriage M1918MI (#9 Morgan Eng.), Spanish–American War Memorial, Henry B. Plant Museum, Tampa, Florida, (gun formerly at Battery Bowyer, Fort Morgan, Alabama)
- One 8-inch gun M1888MII, Bethlehem No. 8, Bottomside, Fort Mills, Corregidor Island, Philippines (gun thought to be formerly at Bty RJ-43, Fort Mills)

== See also ==
- 8-inch Mk. VI railway gun (supplemented the M1888 in World War II)
- 8"/35 caliber gun – Navy gun of similar type and era
- List of U.S. Army weapons by supply catalog designation
- Railway gun
- Seacoast defense in the United States
