= 62nd Air Defense Artillery Regiment =

62nd Air Defense Artillery regiment
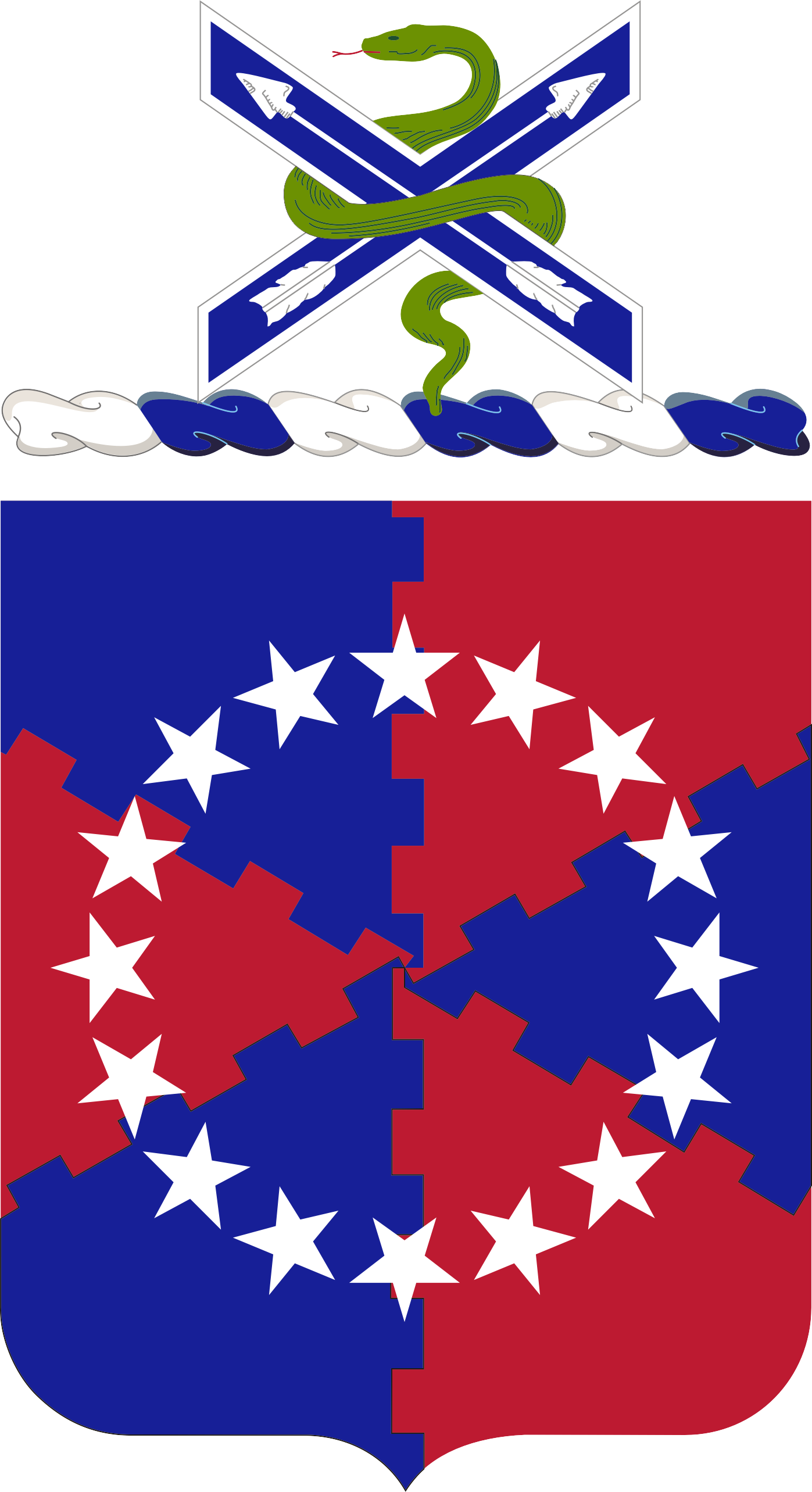
- Coat of arms
- Active: 1917
- Country: USA
- Branch: Army
- Type: Air defense artillery
- Size: Regiment
- Motto(s): "Nitimur in Alta" (Aim High)
- Mascot(s): Oozlefinch
- Decorations: Presidential Unit Citation

Insignia
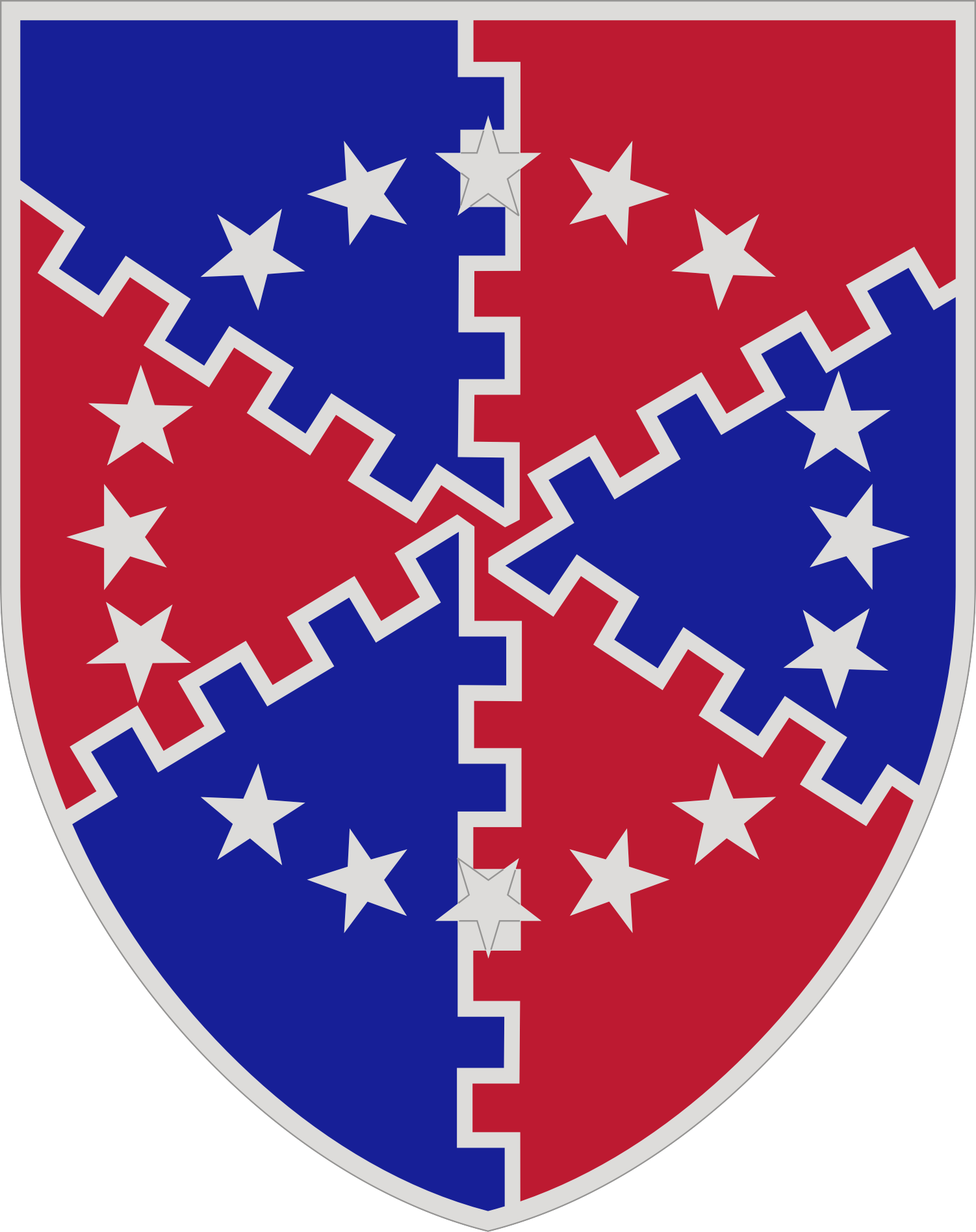
- Distinctive unit insignia

The 62nd Air Defense Artillery Regiment is an Air Defense Artillery regiment in the United States Army. The lineages of some of the units that have been part of the 62nd Air Defense Artillery and its predecessors give the regiment campaign credit for the War of 1812.

== History ==
In 2019, while the Aegis Ashore at NSF Deveselu was being upgraded, B Battery, 62nd Air Defense Artillery Regiment (B-62 THAAD), was emplaced in NSF Deveselu, Romania during the interim.

== Lineage ==
Constituted 27 April 1798 as the 62nd Artillery (CAC). Activated at Fort Winfield Scott 7 January 1918. Assigned to 33rd Brigade CAC, and shipped to Camp Mills New York arrived in France 21 July 1918; returned from France 19 February 1919, Demobilized at Camp Eustis March 1919.

- Reconstituted 1 August 1921 as the 2nd Antiaircraft Battalion (CAC) and organized 4 September 1921 at Fort Totten (New York), with HHD&CT, Search Light, Gun, and Machine Gun Batteries.
- Redesignated 1 June 1922 as 62nd Antiaircraft Battalion, (CAC), and firing batteries consolidated with inactive serially numbered companies as follows
- Searchlight Battery as Battery A. consolidated with 82nd Company (CAC)
- Gun Battery was combined with 165th Company to become Battery B.
- Machine gun Battery as Battery C. consolidated with 167th Company
- HHD&CT redesignated 258th Company (CAC).

Battalion expanded to a regiment 27 August 1922 with HHB, Service Battery, HH&CT 1st Battalion, and nine lettered firing batteries as follows.

- Headquarters and Headquarters Battery, from 9th Company (CAC)
- Service Battery from 37th Company (CAC)
- Headquarters and Headquarters Detachment & Combat Train 1st Battalion, from HHD 1st Battalion 62nd AA.
- A. Battery from 82nd Company (CAC)
- B. Battery from 17th Company (CAC)
- C. Battery from 29th Company (CAC)
- D. Battery from 33rd Company (CAC) (Inactive)
- E. Battery from 30th Company (CAC)
- F. Battery from 32nd Company (CAC)
- G. Battery from 165th Company (CAC) (Inactive)
- H. Battery from 167th Company (CAC) (Inactive)

Regiment Redesignated from 62nd Artillery (AA)(CAC) to 62nd Coast Artillery (AA) Regiment on 1 July 1924. and reorganized.

- on 1 July 1939 Batteries D, G, and H activated.
- 20 January 1941 personnel from Battery B, and Search Light Platoon Battery A. reassigned to Newfoundland and redesignated Battery A 421st CA (AA) Battalion 1 August 1942
- 16 June 1941 Battery H, with Searchlight Platoon A battery attached, transferred to Tungdliarfik Fjord, and Bluie West, Greenland.
- I. Battery (SL) Constituted from Battery H. 16 June 1941 and assigned as part of the garrison at Bluie West.
- H. Battery (37mm AW) transferred less personnel and equipment back to Fort Totten 26 July 1941.
- I. Battery inactivated and disbanded 12 December 1942, personnel and equipment transferred to Battery A 424th CA (AW) Battalion. Battery I transferred to Fort Totten less personnel and equipment.
- 3rd Battalion constituted 27 May 1942 and activated at Fort Totten 15 June 1942.

Regiment moved to Camp Kilmer, NJ. and staged for overseas shipment. sailed for United Kingdom on 6 August 1942 on S.S. Monterey. Disembarked at Greenock, Scotland.

- Landed at Oran, Algeria (Operation Torch), 11 November 1942. moved to Tunisia 10 June 1943.
- Landed Licata, Sicily 23 July 1943
- Inactivated at Palermo, Sicily 10 November 1943. broken up as follows-
- HHB redesignated 80th AAA Group.
- 1st Battalion redesignated 62nd AAA (Gun) Battalion.
- 2nd Battalion redesignated 893rd AAA (AW) Battalion.
- 3rd Battalion redesignated 331st AAA (SL) Battalion.

62nd Coast Artillery (AA) disbanded 4 December 1943.

62nd AAA Battalion moved to Italy 7 July 1944 and landed in southern France 16 August 1944. inactivated 13 March 1946 at Camp Kilmer

- Redesignated 9 December 1948 as 62nd Antiaircraft Artillery Automatic Weapons Battalion, and reactivated 15 January 1949 at Fort Bliss.
- assigned to 2nd Armored Division 4 November 1949
- Relieved from 2nd Armor 20 October 1950.
- redesignated as the 62nd Antiaircraft Artillery Battalion 1 October 1953
- Inactivated 15 September 1958 in Germany
- Consolidated 24 June 1964 with 62nd Artillery a Parent Regiment under the Combat Arms Regimental System.

== Current units ==
- 1st Battalion 62nd Air Defense Artillery Regiment
- 2nd Battalion 62nd Air Defense Artillery Regiment
- 3rd Battalion 62nd Air Defense Artillery Regiment Deactivated 2004
- B Battery (THAAD)
- E Battery (THAAD)

== Distinctive unit insignia ==
- Description

A Silver color metal and enamel device 1 1/32 inches (2.6 cm) in height overall consisting of a shield blazoned: Gyronny of six embattled Azure and Gules, a circle of sixteen mullets Argent.

- Symbolism

Units of the 62d Coast Artillery Regiment, from which the 62d Antiaircraft Artillery Battalion descended, participated in six wars- The War of 1812, Indian Wars, Mexican War, Civil War, Spanish–American War, and the Philippine Insurrection. This participation is symbolized by the six embattled sectors. At the time the first unit was organized the uniforms worn by the Artillery were dark blue faced with scarlet, and there were sixteen states in the Union, commemorated by the blue and red of the shield and the sixteen mullets, respectively.

- Background

The distinctive unit insignia was originally approved for the 62d Coast Artillery Regiment on 21 February 1929. It was redesignated for the 62d Antiaircraft Artillery Automatic Weapons Battalion on 23 August 1949. It was redesignated for the 62d Antiaircraft Artillery Battalion on 4 January 1956. The insignia was redesignated for the 62d Artillery Regiment on 19 December 1958. It was redesignated for the 62d Air Defense Artillery Regiment effective 1 September 1971.

== Coat of arms ==
=== Blazon ===
- Shield

Gyronny of six embattled Azure and Gules, a circle of sixteen mullets Argent.

- Crest

On a wreath of the colors Argent and Azure, on a saltire Azure fimbriated Argent two arrows of the last, all entwined with a serpent Vert. Motto: NITIMUR IN ALTA (We Aim at High Things).

=== Symbolism ===
- Shield

Units of the 62d Coast Artillery Regiment, from which the 62d Antiaircraft Artillery Battalion descended, participated in six wars- The War of 1812, Indian Wars, Mexican War, Civil War, Spanish–American War, and the Philippine Insurrection. This participation is symbolized by the six embattled sectors. At the time the first unit was organized the uniforms worn by the Artillery were dark blue faced with scarlet, and there were sixteen states in the Union, commemorated by the blue and red of the shield and the sixteen mullets, respectively.

- Crest

The saltire is from the Confederate flag and is blue to indicate that the service during the Civil War was with the Northern Army. The two arrows represent the Indian Wars and the serpent the Mexican War.

=== Background ===
The coat of arms was originally approved for the 62d Coast Artillery Regiment on 21 February 1929. It was redesignated for the 62d Antiaircraft Artillery Automatic Weapons Battalion on 23 August 1949. It was redesignated for the 62d Antiaircraft Artillery Battalion on 4 January 1956. The insignia was redesignated for the 62d Artillery Regiment on 19 December 1958. It was redesignated for the 62d Air Defense Artillery Regiment effective 1 September 1971.

== Campaign streamers ==
War of 1812

- Streamer without inscription

Mexican War

- Monterey
- Vera Cruz
- Contreras
- Cerro Gordo
- Molino Del Ray
- Chapultepec
- Puebla 1947

Indian Wars

- Seminoles
- Washington 1856
- Washington 1858

Civil War

- Bull Run
- Mississippi River
- Peninsula
- Antietam
- Fredericksburg
- Chancellorsville
- Gettysburg
- Wilderness
- Spotsylvania
- Shenandoah
- Maryland 1862
- Maryland 1863
- Tennessee 1863
- Virginia 1863
- Tennessee 1864

War with Spain

- Manila

Philippine Insurrection

- Manila
- Malolos
- Luzon 1899

World War II

- Algeria-French Morocco
- Tunisia
- Sicily
- Rome- Arno
- Southern France
- Rhineland
- Ardennes-Alsace
- Central Europe

== Decorations ==
- Presidential Unit Citation (Navy)
- Meritorious Unit Citation (Army)
- Presidential Unit Citation (Korea)
