= Camp Pendleton (Virginia) =

- Camp Pendleton-State Military Reservation Historic District
- U.S. National Register of Historic Places
- U.S. Historic district
- Virginia Landmarks Register
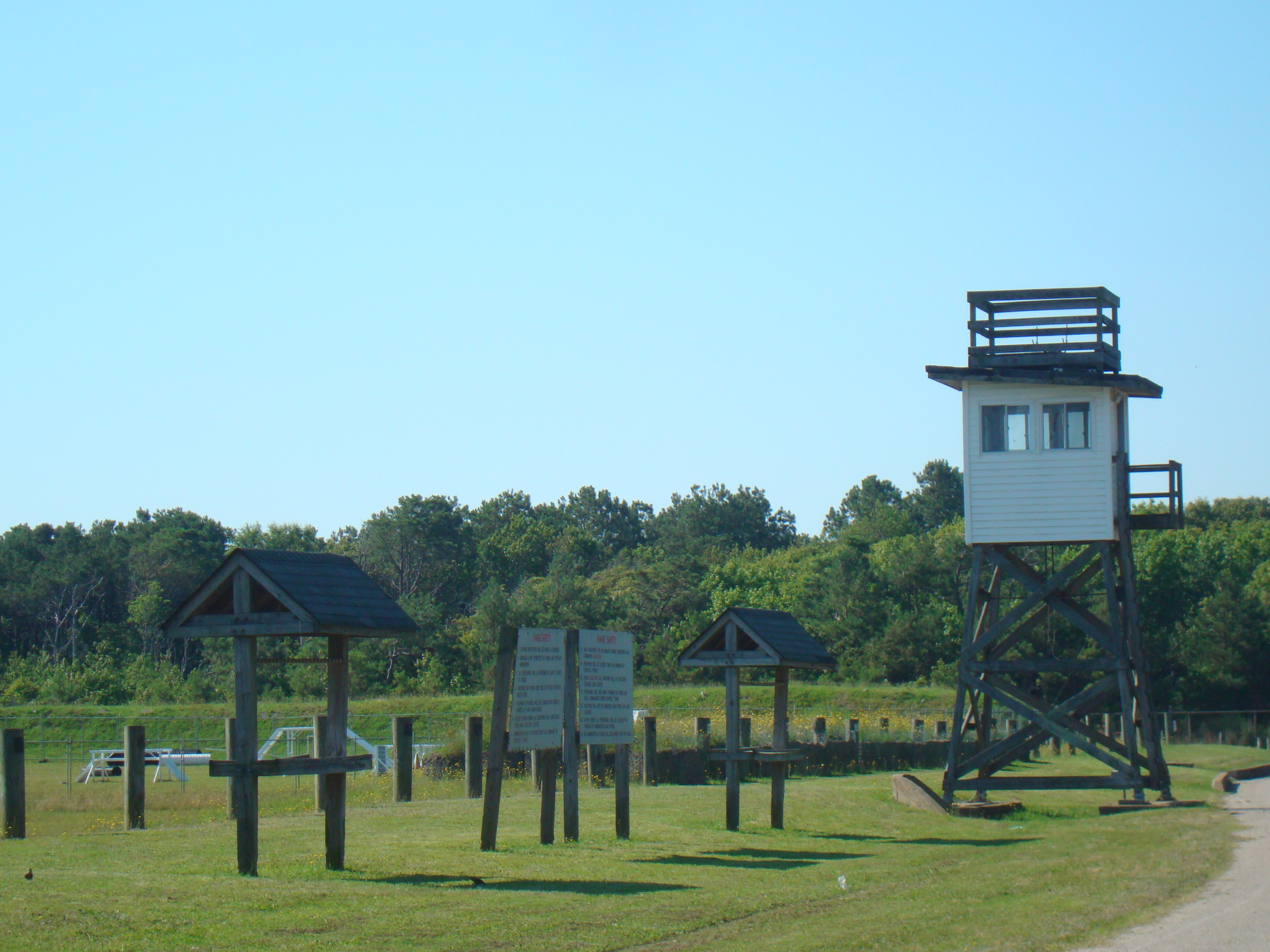
- Rifle range tower at Camp Pendleton

- Location within Virginia Location within the United States
- Location: Roughly bounded by General Booth Blvd., S. Birdneck Rd., and the Atlantic Ocean, Virginia Beach, Virginia
- Coordinates: 36°48′54″N 75°58′58″W
- Area: 328 acres (133 ha)
- Built: 1911
- Architect: W.W. LaPrade, Col. Charles D. Hartman
- Architectural style: Bungalow/craftsman
- NRHP reference No.: 04000852
- VLR No.: 134-0413

Significant dates
- Added to NRHP: September 26, 2005
- Designated VLR: June 16, 2004

Camp Pendleton is a 325-acre (1.32 km^{2}) state military reservation in Virginia Beach, Virginia, named after Confederate Brigadier General William N. Pendleton, who served as Robert E. Lee's chief of artillery during the American Civil War. It lies on the Atlantic coast slightly east of Naval Air Station Oceana.

Since Camp Pendleton is owned by the State of Virginia and not the federal government, the facility was not covered by The Naming Commission's mandate to rename US military installations. However, in January 2021 Governor Ralph Northam "directed his administration to review and recommend a replacement name for Camp Pendleton". Northam was unable to rename this base before he was replaced as governor in January 2022 by Glenn Youngkin who decided not to continue his predecessor's uncompleted work. By March 2023, the Virginia National Guard added this statement to the installation's official website: "The Virginia National Guard no longer uses the Camp Pendleton designation and now refers to it only by the original name of the State Military Reservation".

== History ==
The facility was laid out in 1911, with construction beginning in 1912, as the State Rifle Range for the use of the state militia. Between 1922 and 1942, it was named after the then serving governor of Virginia, being firstly named Camp Trinkle (1922–1926), then Camp Byrd (1926–1930), Camp Pollard (1930–1934), Camp Peery (1934–1938), and Camp Price (1938–1942). During both World Wars, the base was federalized. In World War I it was used by the U.S. Navy for coastal artillery training (more likely the Army, as the Navy had no coastal artillery function and the source states it was an alternative to the Coast Artillery Corps' Camp Eustis) and during World War II it was controlled by the U.S. Army, who first applied the name Camp Pendleton. The 50th Coast Artillery Regiment, with 24 mobile 155 mm guns, was organized at Camp Pendleton in February 1942 and elements remained there until December 1942. The 53rd Coast Artillery Regiment was activated there on 20 July 1942 with personnel from an inactivated portion of the 13th Coast Artillery.

=== National Register of Historic Places ===
The Camp Pendleton-State Military Reservation Historic District was designated a historic district and listed on the National Register of Historic Places on September 26, 2005. The camp initially was about 400 acres (160 ha) in size. The original 1912 construction mostly related to the rifle range, but most of those buildings were demolished prior to World War II. A second major construction phase began in 1919, during which the U.S. Navy focused on improvements to the rifle range. Those buildings have also been demolished, but the layout of both the first and second phase remains. The third and final phase of construction was the responsibility of the U.S. Army during World War II; most of the camp's remaining buildings date from that phase. At the time it was listed on the National Register, Camp Pendleton had 108 buildings in a condition good enough to qualify them as contributing properties.

== Current use ==
Camp Pendleton's primary purpose is the training of the Virginia National Guard, as well as other states' National Guard units and components of the U.S. Armed Forces. Other tenants include the Military Sealift Command, whose facilities are leased to the federal government by the State of Virginia, and the 203rd RED HORSE of the Virginia Air National Guard. On March 3, 2001, 18 members of the 203rd RED HORSE and 3 aviators from the Florida Army National Guard died when their aircraft, a Florida ARNG C-23 Sherpa, crashed over Georgia. It is considered the worst peacetime National Guard crash ever and the worst National Guard loss of life in Virginia since World War II.

In 1991, the United States Department of Defense began the Youth Challenge Program. The Virginia implementation of that program is the Commonwealth Challenge (or Commonwealth ChalleNGe), a program with a military structure operated by the Virginia National Guard on Camp Pendleton for at risk 16 to 18 year olds. It focuses on developing, "...values, skills, education and self-discipline." The at risk youths come from all parts of Virginia. The Camp Pendleton program opened in September 1994 (some cite July 1994), is 5 1/2 months long and offers a GED program. There are three phases: 2 weeks of indoctrination, 20 weeks of the core program, and a 12-month post-graduation program. Community service is part of the program. Classes start each January and June. The only cost to the participant are for personal items; tuition, room, and board are provided. So far 30 classes and over 3000 cadets have graduated from the Virginia program. In 2010, Virginia almost removed funding for the program, but it was restored by the then-governor.

Since shortly after World War II a 2,000 square feet (190 m^{2}) home on the camp has served as a vacation spot for the presiding governor of Virginia. The architecture of this home is in the same style as the rest of the camp. It has vinyl siding. The "cottage" was originally built in 1915 and initially served as the commanding officer's residence. From 2004 until 2014, the United States Naval Sea Cadet Corps conducted summer and winter boot camps at Camp Pendleton.

== Future ==
When the facility was created it was in a relatively remote, sparsely populated area. Since then, the City of Virginia Beach has grown and developed around it, leading to concerns over safety issues. Over time, hundreds of acres of land belonging to the camp have been sold to the city of Virginia Beach. The role of Camp Pendleton is also changing, as more National Guard training takes place at the much larger Fort Pickett, lessening the importance of Camp Pendleton. This has led to repeated requests by the City authorities to convert it to other uses, including complete or partial conversion to a state park. The findings of a report completed at the behest of the Virginia General Assembly on November 22, 1998 were that it was not feasible at that time to convert Camp Pendleton to a state park because of the demands of long-term planning, coordination with the federal government, and environmental reclamation.

== See also ==
- List of U.S. Army installations named for Confederate soldiers
- National Register of Historic Places listings in Virginia Beach, Virginia
