= Fort Crockett =

- Galveston, Texas, United States
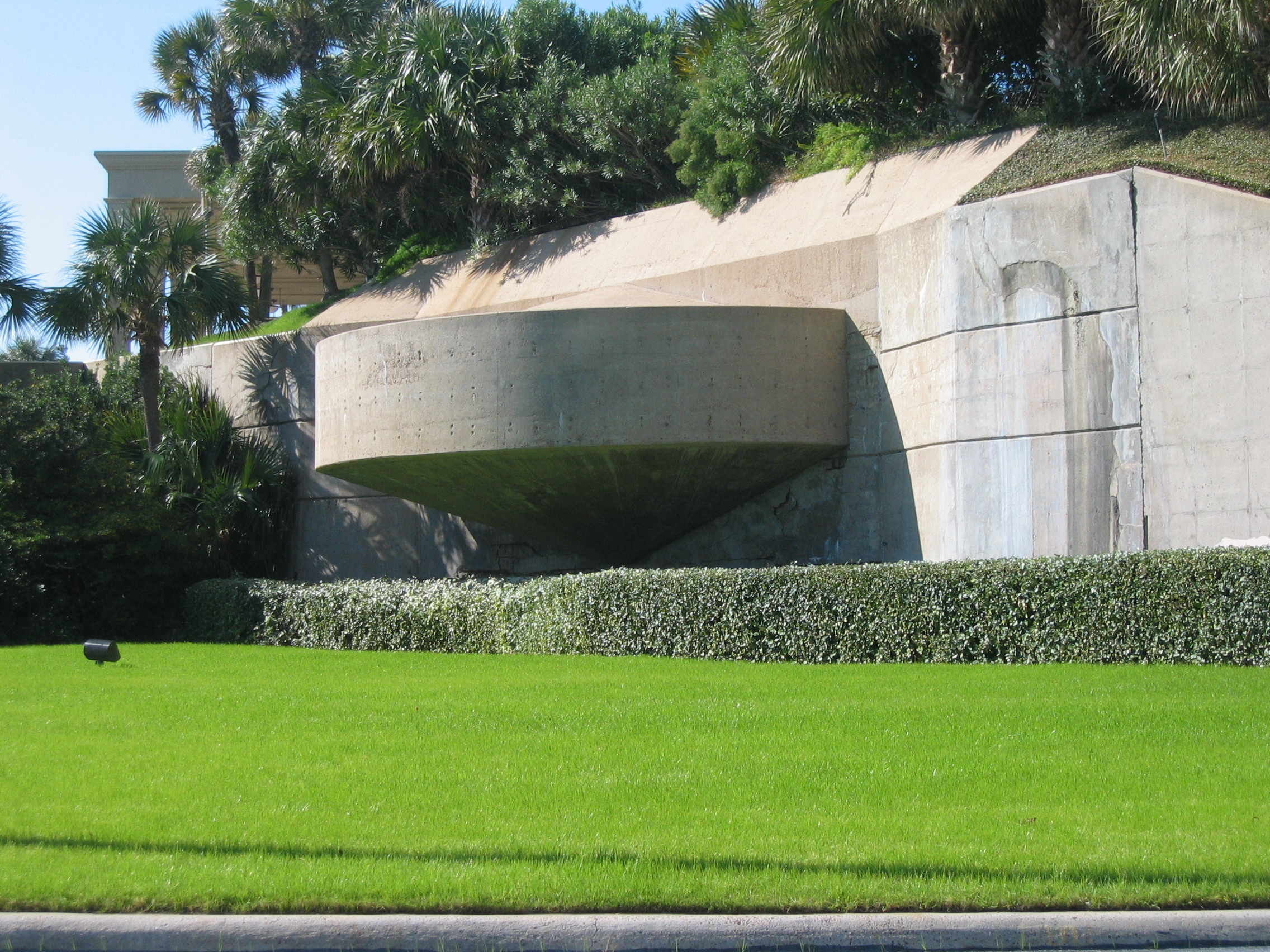
- Casemate of Battery Hoskins

Site information
- Owner: US NOAA National Marine Fisheries Service

Location
- Location within Texas Location within the United States
- Coordinates: 29°16′29″N 94°49′01″W
- Area: 40 acres (160,000 m^{2})

Site history
- Built: 1903

Fort Crockett is a government reservation on Galveston Island overlooking the Gulf of Mexico. The facility was originally built as a defense installation to protect the city and harbor of Galveston and to secure the entrance to Galveston Bay, thus protecting the commercial and industrial ports of Galveston and Houston and the extensive oil refineries in the bay area. The facility is now managed by the US NOAA National Marine Fisheries Service, and hosts the Bureau of Commercial Fisheries Laboratory, the Texas Institute of Oceanography, as well as some university facilities. The area still contains several historical buildings and military fortifications.

== History ==
A military facility of the US Army Coast Artillery Corps on Galveston Island was established in the late 1890s. Construction got underway just in time to be disrupted by the Great Galveston Hurricane of 1900. The United States Army Corps of Engineers spent several years rebuilding and expanding the reservation before it was re-garrisoned. In 1903, the facility was named Fort Crockett in honor of David Crockett, US Congressman from Tennessee and famous Texas hero of the Battle of the Alamo. Following extensive repairs and upgrades, the fort was garrisoned by the US Army.

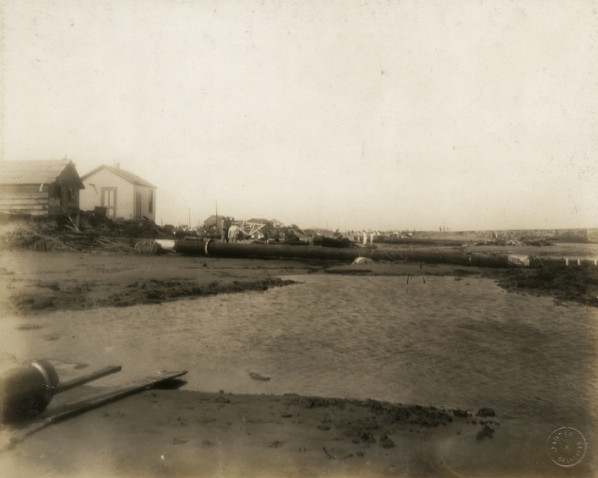
Damaged Fort Crockett Parade Ground after 1915 Galveston Hurricane

During the First World War, Fort Crockett served as a US Army artillery training center. Troops bound for France were trained in the use of several types of artillery.

During the 1920s and early 1930s, Fort Crockett housed the United States Army Air Corps' (USAAC) 3rd Attack Group (an ancestor to USAF's 3rd Wing). At this time, the 3rd Attack Group was the only USAAC group devoted solely to attack aircraft. In 1932, Fort Crocket received eleven A-8 Shrike attack aircraft, the US military's very first all-metal monowing combat aircraft this delivery constituted the first delivery of this aircraft to a forward operational unit. After 1934, the 3rd Attack group was relocated to Barksdale, Louisiana.

During the Second World War, Fort Crockett was expanded with an additional large gun battery, and focus was placed on defense against German U-boats. Additionally, the fort served as a German POW camp.

Following the war, Fort Crockett served for several years as an army recreational center. In addition to the attractions on the base itself (tennis, golf, etc.), the city of Galveston was a major tourist destination with a variety of attractions, thus making the location ideal.

In the 1950s, Fort Crockett became home for fisheries research for the US Fish and Wildlife Service.

In 1958 Texas A&M Marine Lab came to occupy part of the former army barracks. In 1963, the largest of the buildings in the Fort Crockett complex was renovated to house the new Texas Maritime Academy of Texas A&M University (Now called the Texas A&M Maritime Academy).

Due to the massive amount of concrete used in constructing the protective casemate for the guns and magazines, Battery Hoskins proved uneconomical to remove. The abandoned casemates remained an unofficial tourist attraction for decades. In the early 1980s, a luxury resort (the San Luis Resort) was built on and behind the battery. The massive concrete gun emplacements remain dramatically visible from the seawall highway that runs along Galveston Beach, even though one gun emplacement now sports a swimming pool atop it, and the other gun emplacement is adorned with a wedding gazebo.

== Defensive facilities of Galveston Bay ==
- Fort Travis
- U.S. National Register of Historic Places
- Texas State Antiquities Landmark
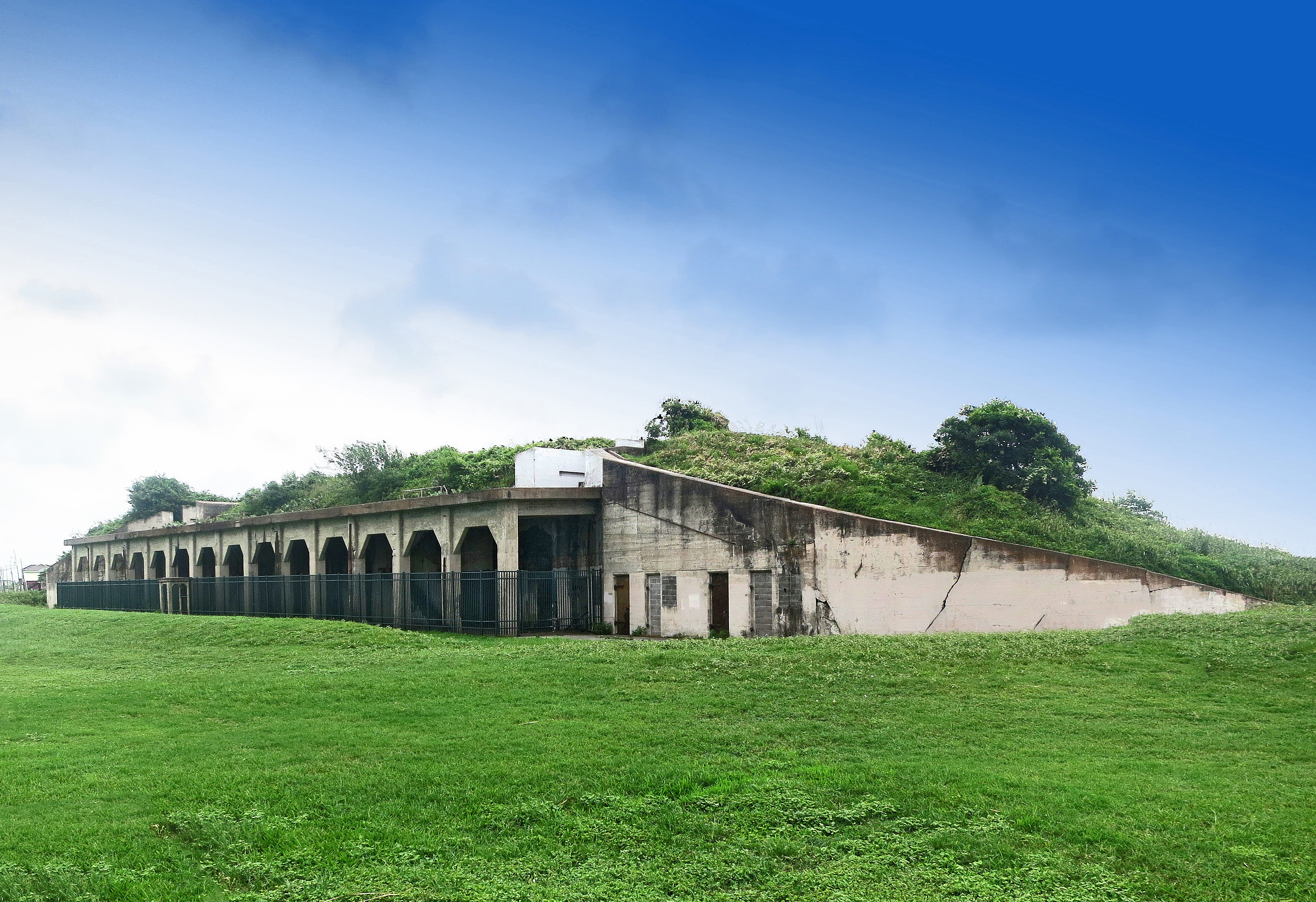
- Fort Travis on Bolivar Peninsula

- Location within Texas Location within the United States
- Location: SH 87 at Loop 108, Port Bolivar, Texas
- Coordinates: 29°21′53″N 94°45′29″W
- Area: 70 acres (28 ha)
- Built: 1898
- NRHP reference No.: 05000247
- TSAL No.: 8200001368

Significant dates
- Added to NRHP: March 30, 2005
- Designated TSAL: January 1, 1984

During the Texas Revolution, Galveston harbor and the entrance to Galveston Bay was secured by a small fortification located at the north east side of Galveston Island, which corresponds to the west side of Bolivar Roads, the entrance to the bay. This was originally named Fort Travis in honor of William Barret Travis, the commanding officer of the Alamo.

In the late 19th century, the entrance to Galveston Bay was secured by two new fortifications, one on each side of the mouth of the bay, as the Coast Defenses of Galveston (Harbor Defenses (HD) after 1924). The "Fort Travis" name was transferred across Bolivar Roads to a new fortification on Point Bolivar, the tip of the Bolivar Peninsula, which forms the east side of the entrance to the bay. An additional new fortification was built on the north east tip of Galveston Island, and was named Fort San Jacinto in honor of the final battle of the Texas Revolution, which established Texas' independence from Mexico.

At the end of the 19th century, Fort Crockett was established as headquarters for all three facilities. Located west of the city of Galveston, its long-range guns could command the entire area. By the first half of the 20th century, Fort Crockett had the basic equipment believed needed to defend the Galveston area from attack from air or sea.

=== Coastal artillery batteries at Fort Crockett ===
From 1924 through 1940, HD Galveston was garrisoned by Battery G, 13th Coast Artillery (HD) Regiment as a caretaker unit. In early World War II, two regiments of the US Army Coast Artillery Corps were headquartered at Fort Crockett, and manned four major artillery batteries, each supporting a different type of artillery. These regiments were the 20th Coast Artillery (HD) Regiment, 265th Coast Artillery (HD) Regiment, and elements of the 50th Coast Artillery (Tractor Drawn) (TD) Regiment. Though installed over several decades, the different guns were selected to provide both long-range and rapid-fire support. Battery Izard contained eight 12-inch mortars. Battery Wade Hampton contained two 10-inch "disappearing" guns. Battery Laval contained two 3-inch (76 mm) guns, and Battery Hoskins contained two 12-inch (305 mm) guns. These batteries were supported by various fire-control structures, with radar and anti-aircraft guns added in the 1940s.

=== Coastal artillery batteries at Fort San Jacinto ===
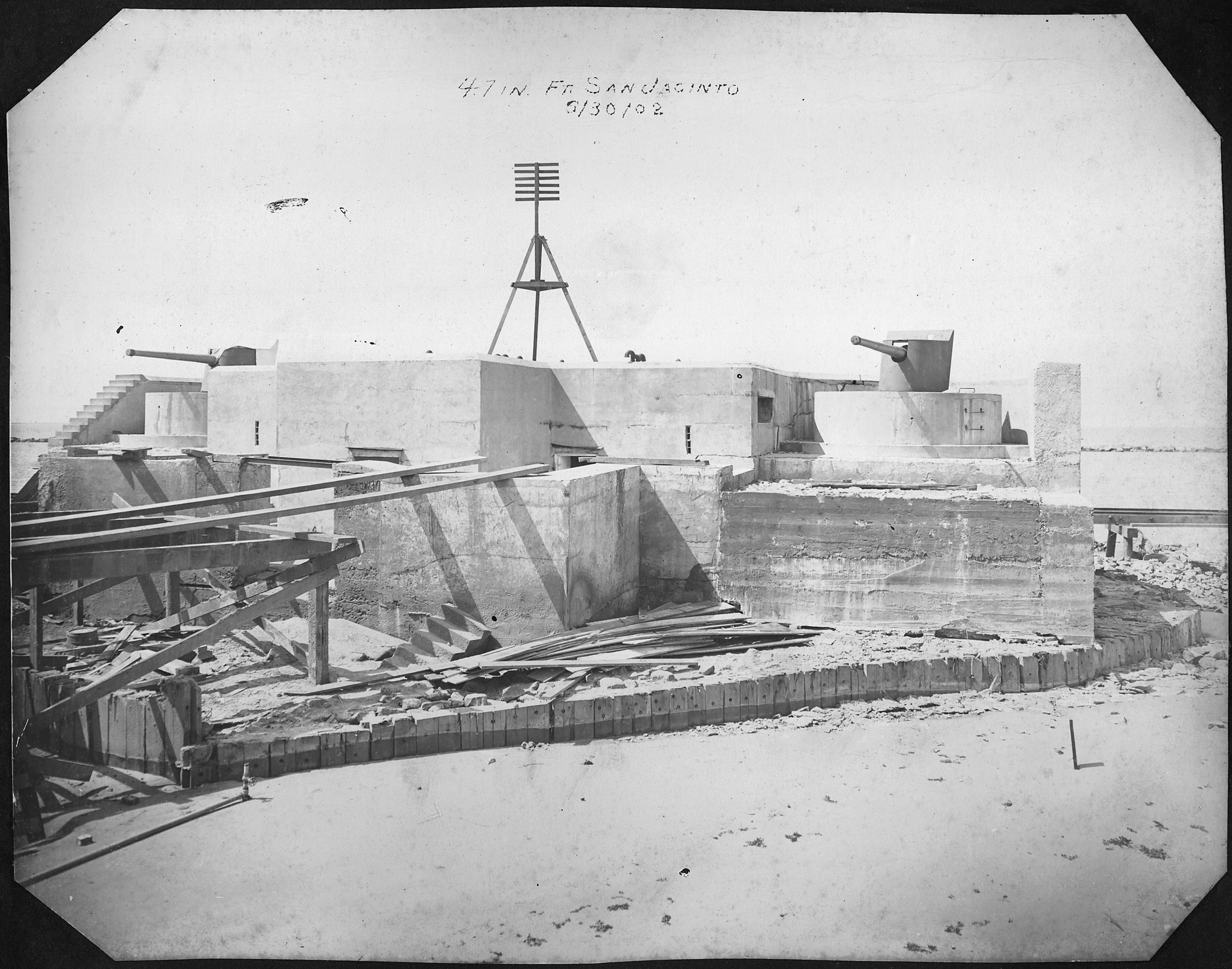
Battery Hogan at Fort San Jacinto (1902)

Additional companies of Coast Artillery were stationed at Fort San Jacinto, located on the north-east tip of Galveston Island, commanding the southern portion of the entrance to Galveston Bay. Battery Mercer contained 12-inch mortars. Battery Heileman contained two 10-inch "disappearing" guns. Battery Hogan contained two 4.7-inch (119 mm) guns, and Battery Croghan contained two 3-inch (76 mm) guns. Battery #235 contained 6-inch (152 mm) guns and another battery contained 90 mm guns.

=== Coastal artillery batteries at Fort Travis ===
One additional company of Coast Artillery was stationed at Fort Travis, located at Bolivar Point, commanding the northern side of the entrance to Galveston Bay. Battery Kimble contained two 12-inch (305 mm) guns. Battery Davis contained two 8-inch (203 mm) guns. Battery Ernst contained two 3-inch (76 mm) guns. These batteries were supported by various fire-control structures, and radar in the 1940s. Fort Travis was served by a spur track until the Santa Fe Railway abandoned its Bolivar Peninsula trackage in 1942.

== See also ==
- 13th Coast Artillery (United States)
- 20th Coast Artillery (United States)
- List of World War II prisoner-of-war camps in the United States
- National Register of Historic Places listings in Galveston County, Texas
