= 50th Coast Artillery (United States) =

50th Coast Artillery Regiment
- Active: 1918 – 1919; 1924 – 1944
- Country: United States
- Branch: Army
- Type: Coast artillery
- Role: Tractor drawn heavy artillery
- Size: Regiment
- Mascot: Oozlefinch
- Engagements: World War I; Admiralty Islands campaign (World War II)

The 50th Coast Artillery Regiment was a Coast Artillery Corps regiment in the Regular Army. It was mobilized in World War I and World War II.

== World War I ==
The 50th Artillery (Coast Artillery Corps) (CAC) was organized in July 1918 at Camp Eustis, Virginia. Moved to Brest, France via Newport News port of embarkation October 1918 on the Italian liner SS America. Moved from Brest to Montoir-de-Bretagne (Loire-Inférieure) 30 October 1918 until the Armistice. The regiment was slated to be armed with 24 British-designed 9.2-inch howitzers, but did not commence training or see action, possibly not even receiving guns, until after the Armistice. They trained at Operations & Training Center No. 5 at Angers post-Armistice, with a firing range at Montmorillon, but on 26 November moved to Camp Pontanezen in Brest. Returned to the US February 1919, demobilized March 1919 at Camp Dix, New Jersey.

== World War II ==
Constituted 24 January 1942 as an inactive regiment and activated as the 50th Coast Artillery Regiment (155 mm gun) at Camp Pendleton, Virginia 1 February 1942, assigned to Provisional Coast Artillery Brigade. Regiments of this type began World War II with 24 155 mm M1918 guns on mobile mounts in six batteries of four guns each, and may later have received the 155 mm M1 gun.

Battery A transferred to Tongatapu, Tonga Islands in South Pacific 15 March 1942. On 17 July 1942 Battery A redesignated 825th CA (155 mm Gun) Battery (Separate) and Battery A transferred back to Camp Pendleton, less personnel and equipment, and reorganized later in 1942.

Battery B deployed to Efate, New Hebrides in the South Pacific, via the San Francisco Port of Embarkation, 2 March 1942 until January 1943, when it was redesignated 826th CA (155 mm Gun) Battery (Separate), and Battery B returned, less personnel and equipment, to Camp Pendleton.

The 2nd and 3rd Battalions were activated and trained in February and March 1942.

Headquarters and headquarters battery (HHB) transferred to Fort Crockett in the Harbor Defenses of Galveston 9 April 1942 to 4 May 1942, when personnel and equipment transferred to HHB 20th CA (Harbor Defense (HD)) Regt and HHB 50th CA transferred (less personnel and equipment) to Camp Pendleton.

Regimental HHB, 3rd Battalion HHB, and Battery E arrived Galveston, Texas 9 April 1942. Sections (2 guns each) of Battery E assigned to Port Aransas and Sabine Pass, Texas. HHB 3rd Battalion posted at Fort Crockett 10 April 1942 to 21 October 1942.

Battery F entrained for Fort Barrancas, Florida. Arriving 7 April 1942, Battery F moved by motor convoy to Fort Morgan, Alabama and established Temporary Harbor Defenses (THD) of Fort Morgan. 3rd Battalion HHB with Batteries E and F transferred to the Gulf Sector, Southern Defense Command.

HHB 50th CA was reorganized at Camp Pendleton 4 May 1942 using personnel of HHB, 244th CA (155 mm Gun) Regiment.

The 1st Battalion, 50th CA reorganized in 1942, and with 2nd Battalion remained assigned to Provisional CA Brigade at Camp Pendleton until December 1942. On 19 December 1942, the reorganized 50th CA (HHB and 1st & 2nd Battalions) was temporarily transferred to the Southern Sector, Eastern Defense Command, HHB and 1st Battalion at Fort Taylor, Florida, 2nd Battalion at Fort Moultrie, South Carolina. On 18 May 1943 the regiment was transferred to Camp Hero, New York until 4 October 1943. HHB transferred to Fort McKinley, Maine, arriving 6 October 1943 until ordered to Fort Devens, Massachusetts 13 January 1944 and inactivated 21 January 1944. The 1st and 2nd Battalions at Camp Hero were also inactivated, and the 50th CA was disbanded 31 January 1944.

The personnel of 1st Battalion were reorganized into the 42nd CA Battalion (155 mm Gun), activated 2 February 1944 at Camp Hero and transferred through Seattle to Alaska, eventually Camp Earle on Attu, prior to November 1945 return to Fort Lawton, Washington, and inactivation 28 November 1945.

The 2nd Battalion shipped from San Francisco 4 December 1943, arriving Milne Bay, Papua 2 January 1944. Assigned to Cape Cretin 5 March 1944 and redesignated 43rd CA Battalion (155 mm Gun) 5 April 1944. No longer required at Cape Cretin, 43rd CA Battalion transferred to Pityilu Island in the Admiralties 16 April 1944. The 43rd Battalion remained in the Admiralties through the end of the war, firing field artillery missions for the 1st Cavalry Division on Los Negros. Arrived Los Angeles 30 December 1945; transferred to Camp Anza, California and inactivated 31 December 1945.

3rd Battalion HHB and Battery E departed Texas for Pascagoula, Mississippi, establishing THD Pascagoula 22 October 1942. On 4 November 1943, 3rd Battalion HHB and Battery E departed Pascagoula for Fort Morgan, leaving a detachment of the battalion HHB to operate THD Pascagoula. At Fort Morgan, Battery E redesignated 721st CA Btry (155 mm Gun) (Separate) 18 December 1943. The 3rd Battalion and 721st Battery departed Fort Morgan in late 1943 for Fort Barrancas. Ordered to Camp Shelby, MS, they arrived 25 January 1944. They were disbanded 28 January 1944 and personnel assigned to Army Ground Forces.

== Campaign streamers ==
43rd Coast Artillery Battalion after redesignation from 2nd Battalion, 50th Coast Artillery:

World War II

- Bismarck Archipelago
- New Guinea

== See also ==
- Seacoast defense in the United States
- United States Army Coast Artillery Corps
- Harbor Defense Command
