= 20th Coast Artillery (United States) =

20th Coast Artillery Regiment
- Active: 1940 - 1944
- Country: United States
- Branch: Army
- Type: Coast artillery
- Role: Harbor defense
- Size: Regiment
- Part of: Harbor Defenses of Galveston
- Garrison/HQ: Fort Crockett
- Mascot(s): Oozlefinch

The 20th Coast Artillery Regiment was a Coast Artillery regiment in the United States Army. It was the garrison of the Harbor Defenses of Galveston in World War II, with Battery C deployed to Tongatapu, Tonga March-August 1942. Until the 20th CA (Harbor Defense) (HD) was fully activated in April 1942, HD Galveston was also garrisoned by the 265th Coast Artillery (HD) Regiment and elements of the 50th Coast Artillery (Tractor Drawn) (TD) Regiment. The 20th CA Regiment was active from August 1940 until broken up and partly deactivated in August 1944 as part of an Army-wide reorganization.

== Lineage 1 ==
Constituted and organized in October 1918 as the 20th Artillery (Coast Artillery Corps) (C.A.C.) at Fort Crockett, Texas, but demobilized in November 1918. This was one of a number of Coast Artillery regiments mobilized to operate heavy and railway artillery on the Western Front in World War I, but the Armistice resulted in the dissolution of the 20th.

== Lineage 2 ==
Constituted in the Regular Army 1 February 1940 as the 20th Coast Artillery (Harbor Defense) (HD), activated 1 August 1940 at Fort Crockett by reorganizing caretaker Battery G, 13th Coast Artillery as HHB, 20th Coast Artillery. Battery A also activated same date.

- Batteries B and C activated 1 March 1941 at Fort Crockett.
- Battery C transferred to Tongatapu, Tonga 23 March 1942.
- On 1 April 1942 part of Battery H and other elements were transferred to Battery A, which was redesignated the 812th CA Battery (HD) (Separate).
- Battery A was reorganized at Fort Crockett (possibly on or soon after 1 April 42), and on 12 May 1942 moved to Fort San Jacinto.
- 3rd Battalion activated 1 April 1942 and posted at Fort Travis until 1 July 1942 when moved to Temporary Harbor Defenses (THD) of Freeport, Texas, with Battery C. Battery G activated 1 April 1942 at Fort Travis.
- Battery I activated at THD Freeport, TX with surplus personnel from 20th CA and moved to Fort Crockett 2 July 1942.
- On 1 September 1942 Battery C transferred back to Fort Crockett and the 812th CA Battery transferred to Tongatapu, both less personnel and equipment.
- The 20th CA operated HD Galveston with the 265th Coast Artillery (HD) Regiment January-December 1941. 2nd Battalion, 265th CA, departed for HD Los Angeles 9 December 1941, leaving Galveston manned by 1st Battalion, 265th CA, and the partially organized 20th CA. When 1st Bn, 265th CA, transferred to Key West in April 1942, HHB 50th Coast Artillery (Tractor Drawn) (TD) Regiment, 3rd Battalion HHB, and Battery F, 50th CA (TD), were temporarily assigned to HD Galveston, while 20th CA was organizing on the Texas coast until early May. 1st & 2nd Bn HHBs and Batteries D, E, F, G, H, & I were activated 1 April 1942 at Ft. Crockett and assigned to various posts at Galveston, relieving the 50th CA and 1st Battalion, 265th CA. Battery K (searchlight) was activated on 9 April 1942.
- In addition to manning HD Galveston, elements of the 20th CA took over THDs along the Texas coast, rotating units between HD Galveston and outposts at Port Aransas, TX; Calcasieu and Sabine Passes, Louisiana; Freeport, Indianola, and Port Isabel, TX into 1944.
- On 31 August 1944 the 20th CA was broken up. The regimental HHB was reorganized as HHB HD Galveston and the 1st Battalion became the 20th CA Battalion (HD) (Sep). Battery K became Battery K (searchlight) HD Galveston. Batteries D and E were deactivated with personnel reassigned to HD Galveston, and the regiment was disbanded.
- 20th CA Battalion disbanded 31 March 1945 at Fort Travis.

== See also ==
- Distinctive unit insignia (U.S. Army)
- Seacoast defense in the United States
- United States Army Coast Artillery Corps
- Harbor Defense Command
