= Youth Challenge Program =

National Guard program for at-risk youth

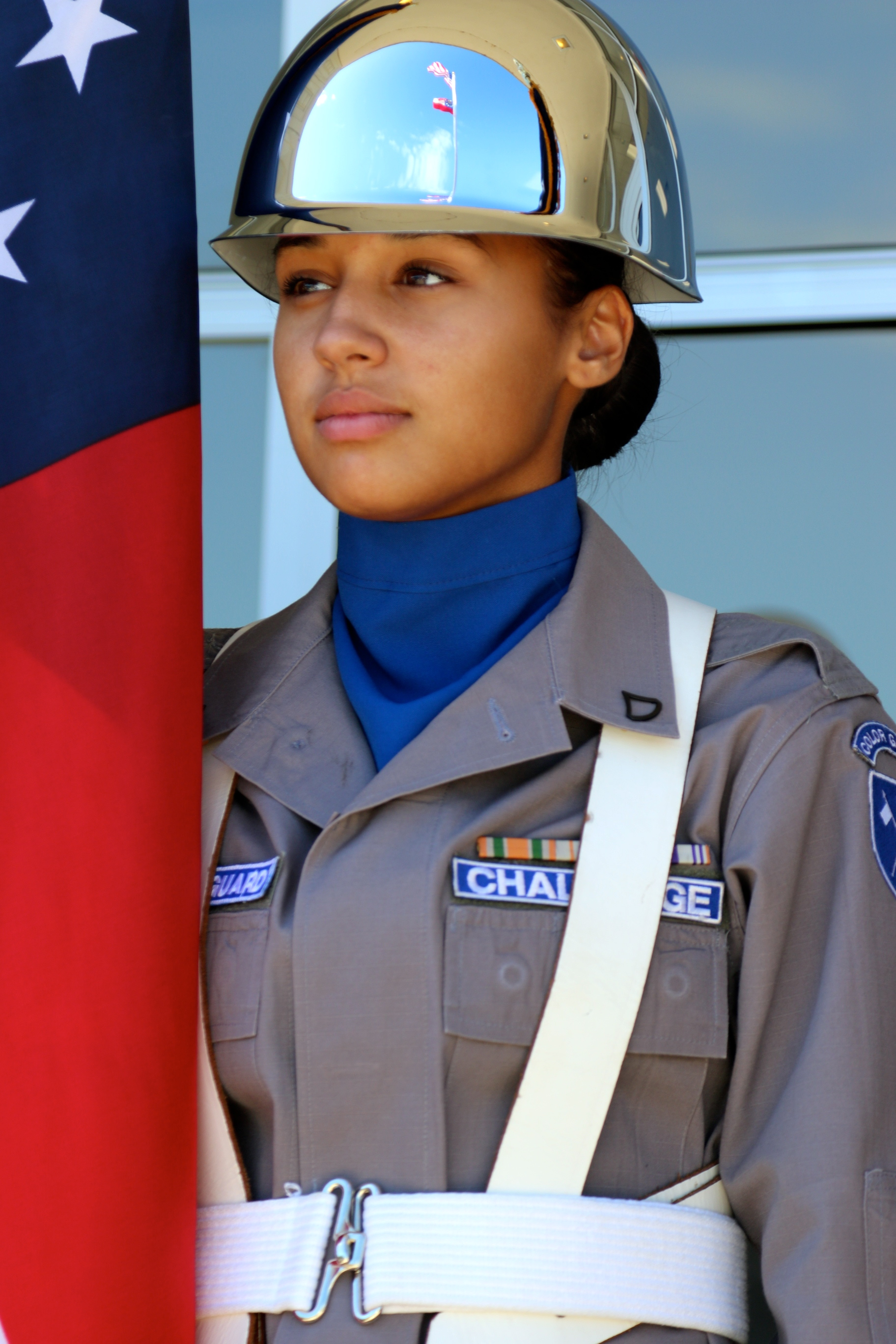
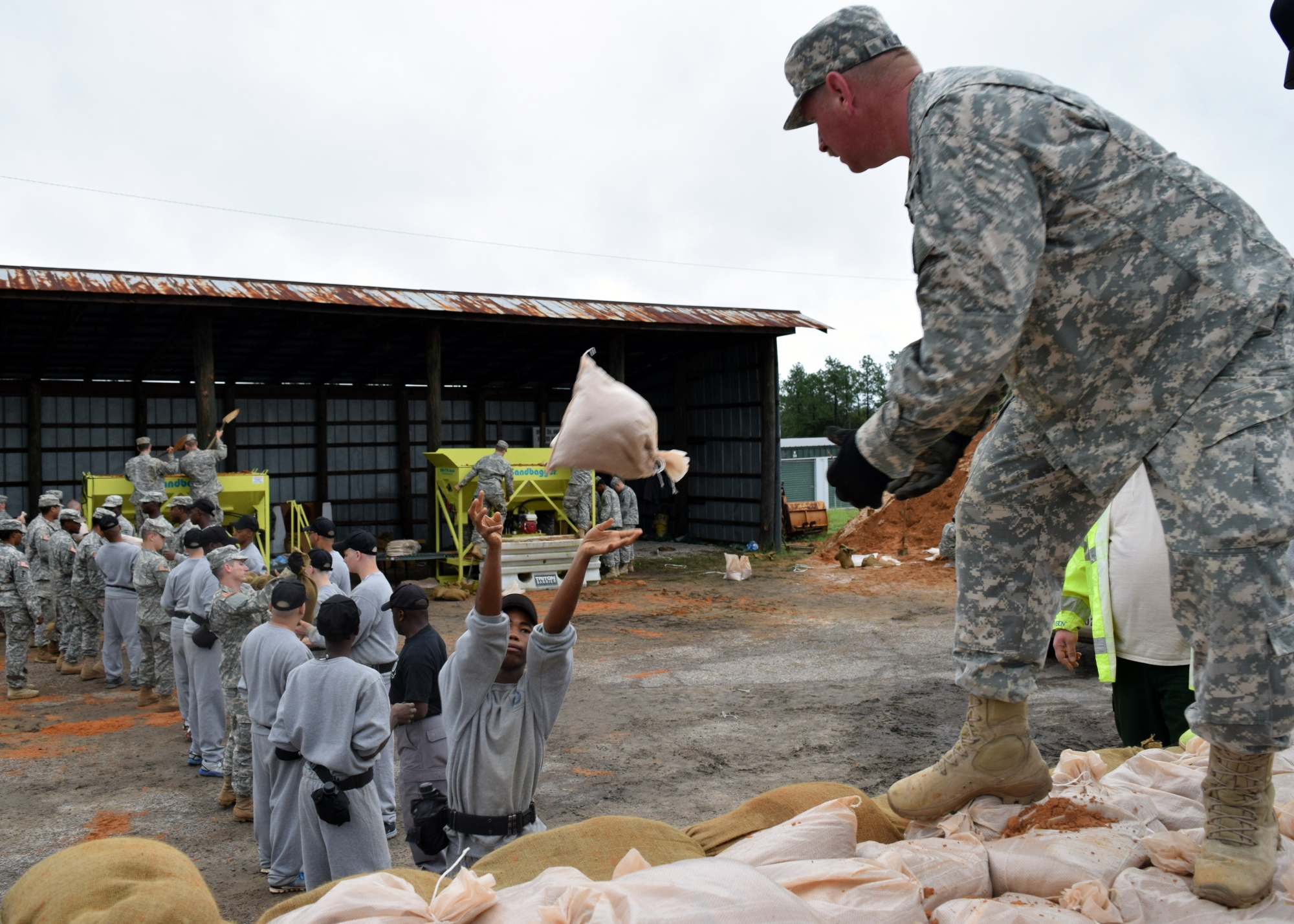
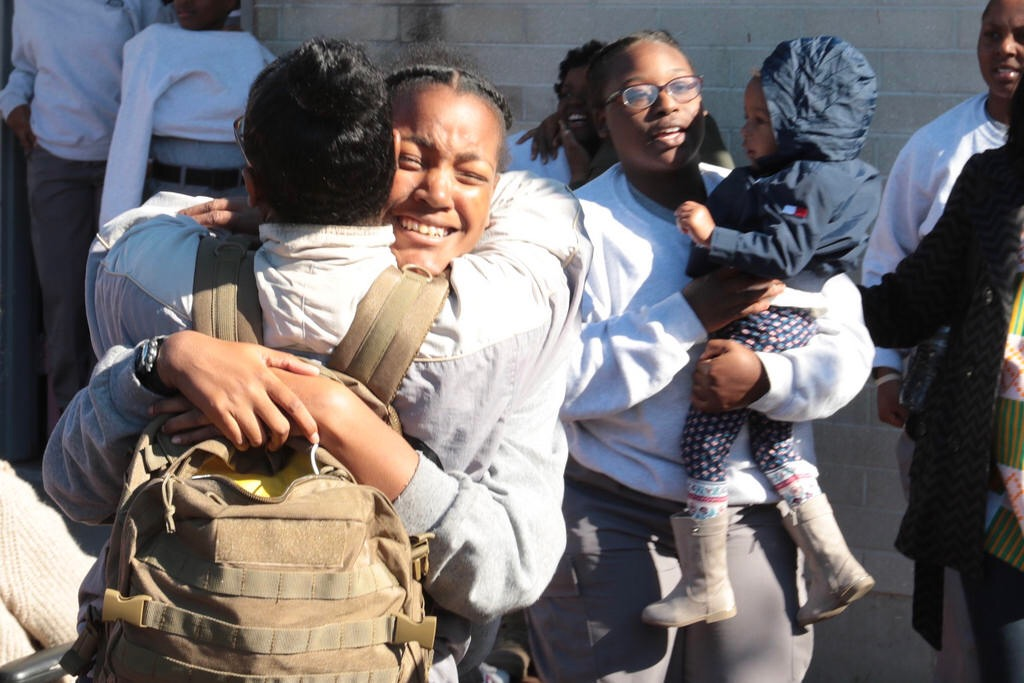
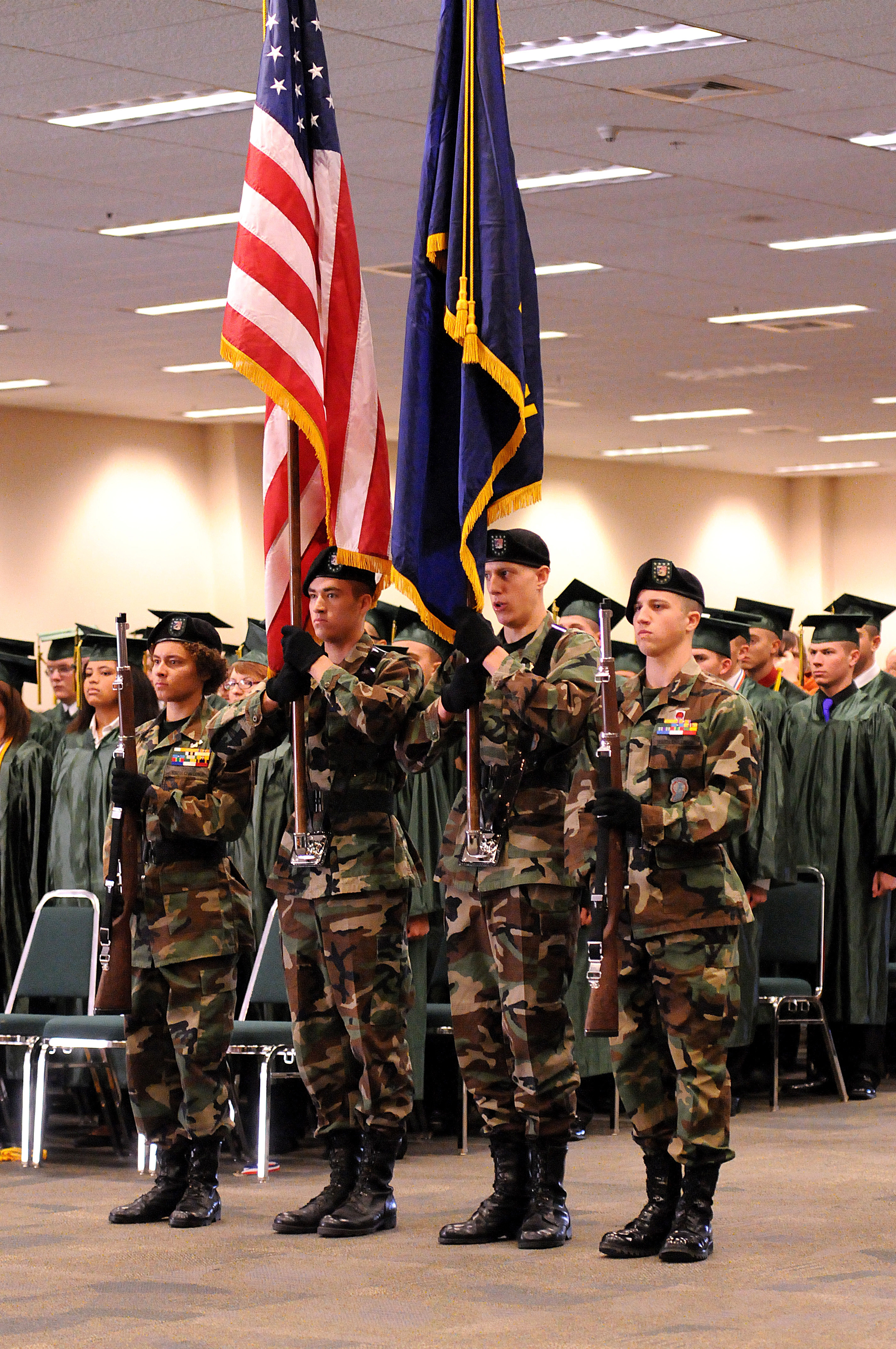
Top left: Cadet Darblin Cabral, from the Ft. Stewart Youth Challenge Academy Class 47 Honor Guard. Top right: A Youth Challenge Academy cadet throws a sandbag to Georgia State Defense Force Cpl. Richard Wilson. Bottom left: A student hugs her mother during the Georgia National Guard Youth Challenge Academy Family Day event. Bottom right: The Oregon National Guard Youth Challenge Program Cadet Color Guard team.

The Youth ChalleNGe Program is a program for at-risk youth run by the National Guard of the United States (which is why the NG in ChalleNGe is either: Capitalized, Italicized, Bolded or all of the above), which consists of Youth Challenge Academies (known as YCA's) in each participating state. The stated mission of the Youth Challenge Program is "to intervene in and reclaim the lives of at-risk youth to produce program graduates with the values, skills, education and self-discipline necessary to succeed as adults." The program accepts 16- to 18-year-old male and female high school dropouts who are drug-free and not in trouble with the law. The program lasts for 17½ months. The first 5½ months are part of the quasi-military Residential Phase. The last 12 months are part of the Post-Residential Phase. Most participants will earn their GED or a high school diploma by the end of their Residential Phase.

The program is one of many programs administered by the National Guard Bureau that address leadership, life skills, and physical training.

== Phases ==
=== Acclimation phase ===
The program begins with a 2-week Acclimation Phase where candidates can adjust to the physical, mental, and disciplined aspects of the program. At the end of the Acclimation Phase, candidates graduate to cadets and begin the Residential Phase of the program.

=== Residential phase ===
The residential phase is a 22-week long phase and the main phase of the Youth Challenge Program. During the Residential Phase, Cadets will attend school, participate in physical training, learn the values of discipline and teamwork, and explore numerous career opportunities.

=== Post-residential phase ===
The post-residential phase is a 12-month period that focuses on placement. Cadets must secure positive placement via a job, returning to high school, enrolling in college or a trade program, enlist in the military, or volunteer at least 30 hours a week. Cadets are also expected to maintain contact with their mentor and the program placement staff.

== Participating states and territories ==
The following is a list of states who participate in the Youth Challenge Program. Some states have multiple campuses; for example, Georgia has a YCA at both Fort Stewart and Fort Gordon, but both fall under the same state director.

- Alaska Military Youth Academy in *Alaska
- Arkansas Youth Challenge in *Arkansas
- Sunburst Youth Academy in *California
- Capital Guardian Youth ChalleNGe Academy in *District of Columbia
- Florida Youth ChalleNGe Academy in *Florida
- Georgia Youth Challenge in *Georgia
- Hawaii Youth ChalleNGe Academy in *Hawaii
- Idaho Youth ChalleNGe Academy in *Idaho
- Lincoln's ChalleNGe Academy in *Illinois
- Hoosier Youth ChalleNGe Academy in *Indiana
- National Guard Youth ChalleNGe Program in *Kentucky
- Louisiana National Guard Youth ChalleNGe Program in *Louisiana
- Michigan Youth ChalleNGe Academy in *Michigan
- Mississippi ChalleNGe Academy in *Mississippi
- Montana Youth ChalleNGe Academy*Montana
- Battle Born Youth ChalleNGe Academy in *Nevada
- New Jersey Youth ChalleNGe Academy in *New Jersey
- New Mexico Youth ChalleNGe Academy in *New Mexico
- Tarheel ChalleNGe Academy in*North Carolina
- Thunderbird Youth Academy in *Oklahoma
- Oregon Youth ChalleNGe Program in *Oregon
- Puerto Rico Youth ChalleNGe Academy in *Puerto Rico
- Keystone State ChalleNGe Academy in *Pennsylvania
- SC Youth ChalleNGe Academy in*South Carolina
- Tennessee National Guard Volunteer ChalleNGe Academy in *Tennessee
- Texas ChalleNGe Academy in *Texas
- Virginia National Guard Commonwealth ChalleNGe Youth Academy in*Virginia
- Washington Youth Academy in *Washington
- Mountaineer ChalleNGe Academy in *West Virginia
- Wisconsin ChalleNGe Academy in *Wisconsin
- Wyoming Cowboy Challenge Academy in *Wyoming

== Related programs by the National Guard ==
- Partners in Education
- HUMVEE School Program
- YOU CAN School Program
- Guard Fit Challenge
- Heritage Outreach Program
- ASVAB Career Exploration Program
- GED Plus Program
- About Face
- Forward March
- National Guard Drug Demand Reduction Program

== Gallery ==
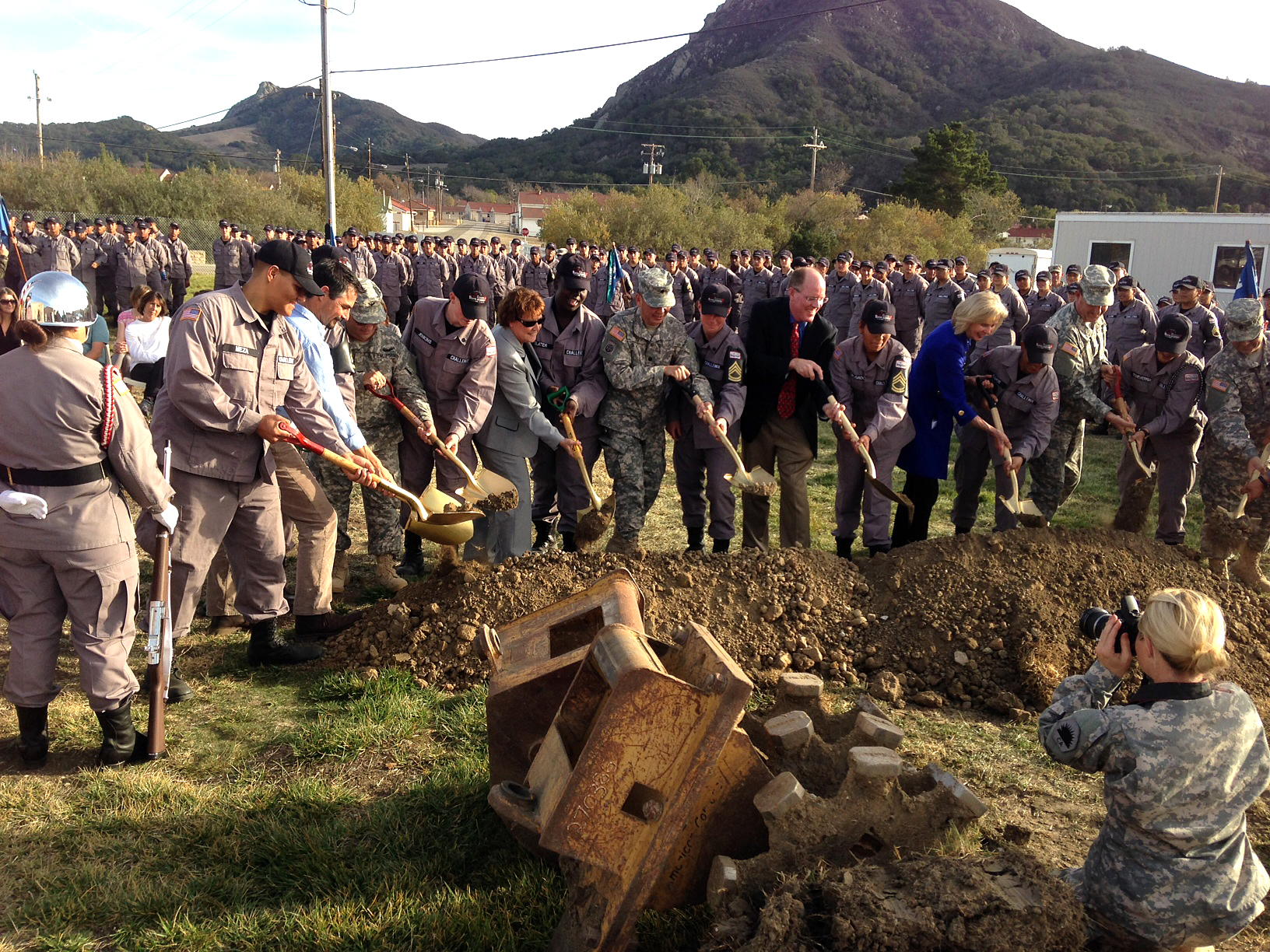
Officials break ground for the California National Guard's Grizzly Youth Academy program expansion work at Camp San Luis Obispo.

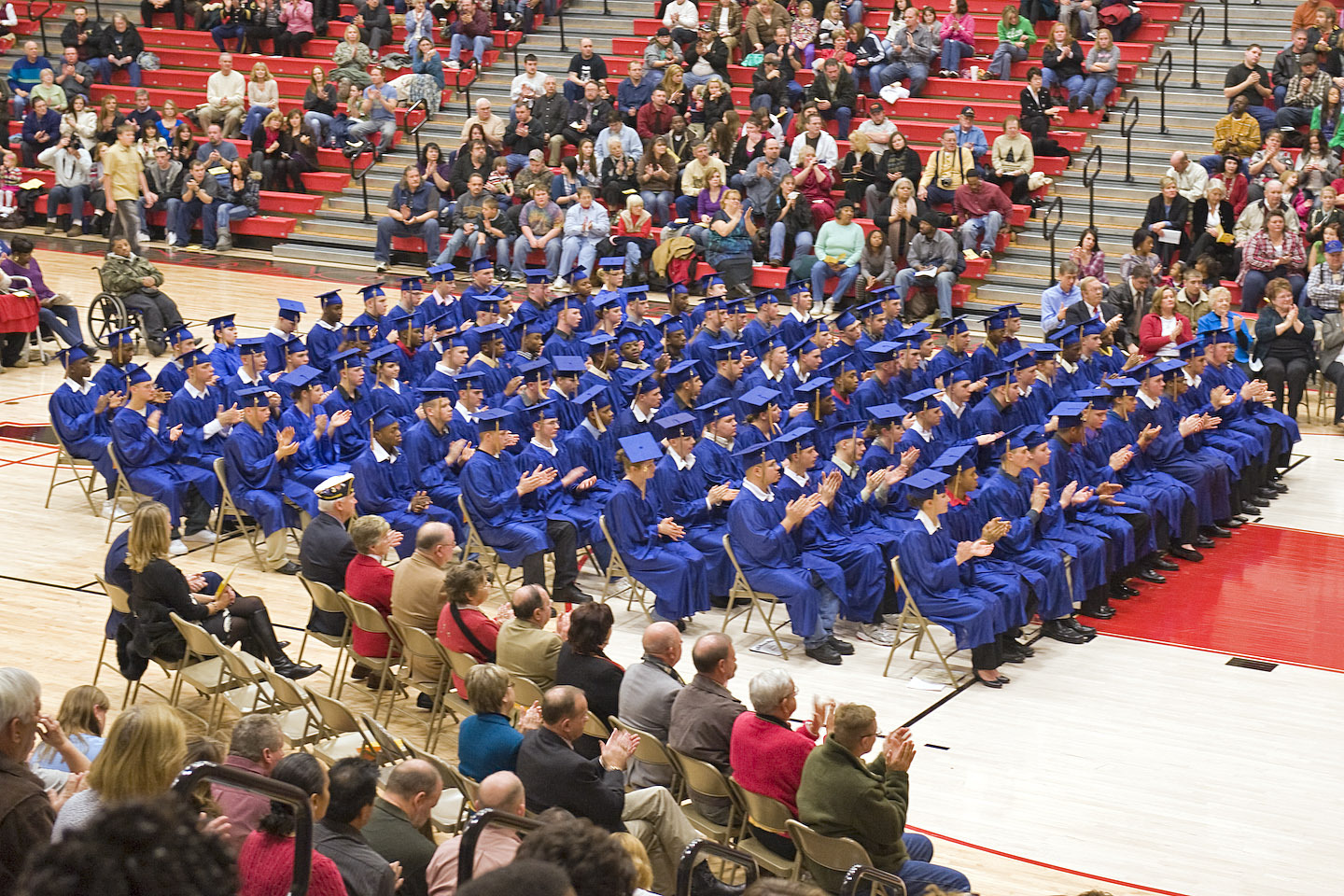
Hoosier Youth Challenge Academy cadets applaud at their graduation ceremony held at the high school in Knightstown, Indiana.

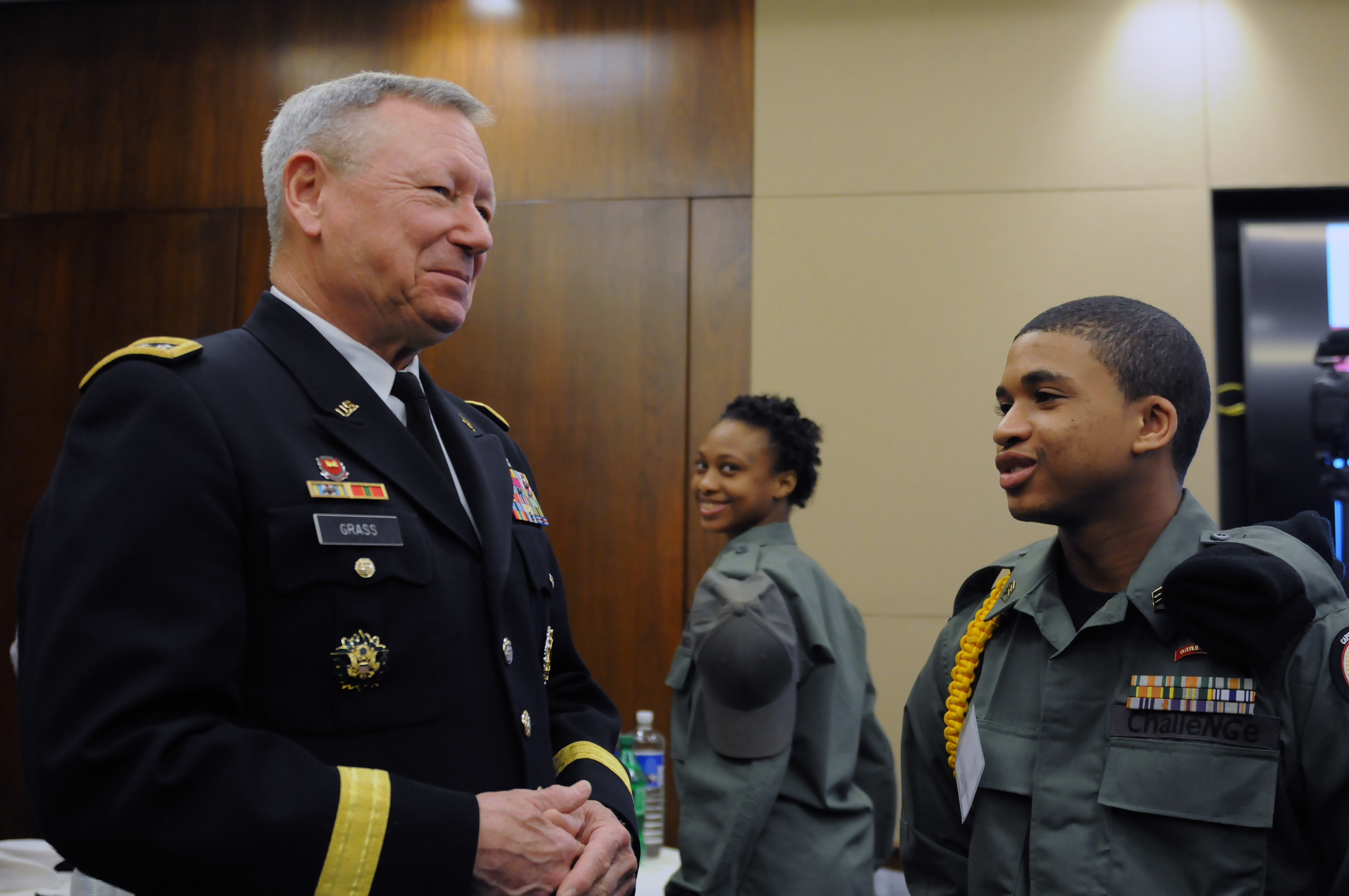
Army Gen. Frank Grass, chief, National Guard Bureau, converses with a Capital Guardian Youth ChalleNGe Academy cadet.

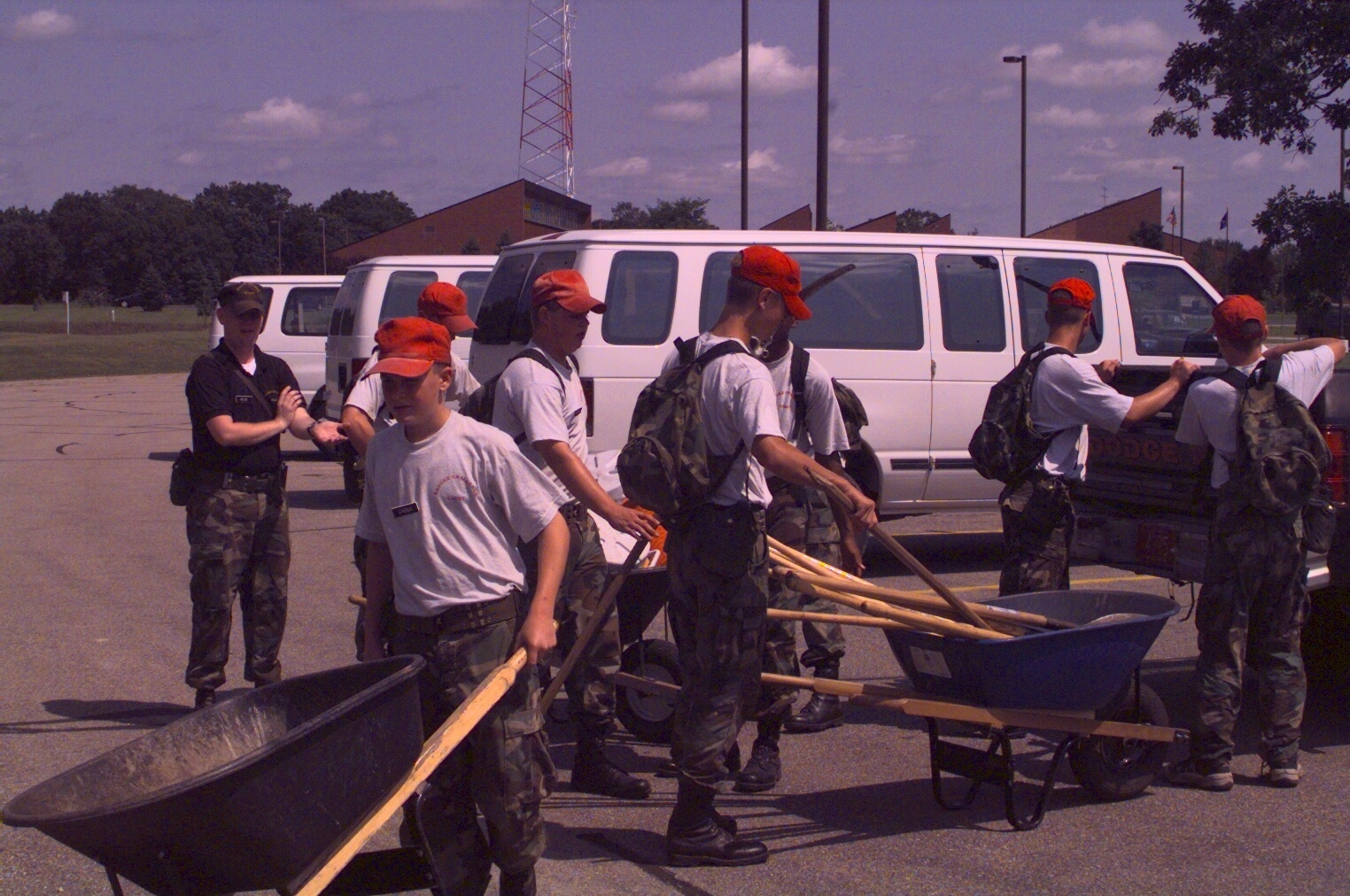
Badger Challenge cadets work on a walking trail near the Wisconsin Military Academy.

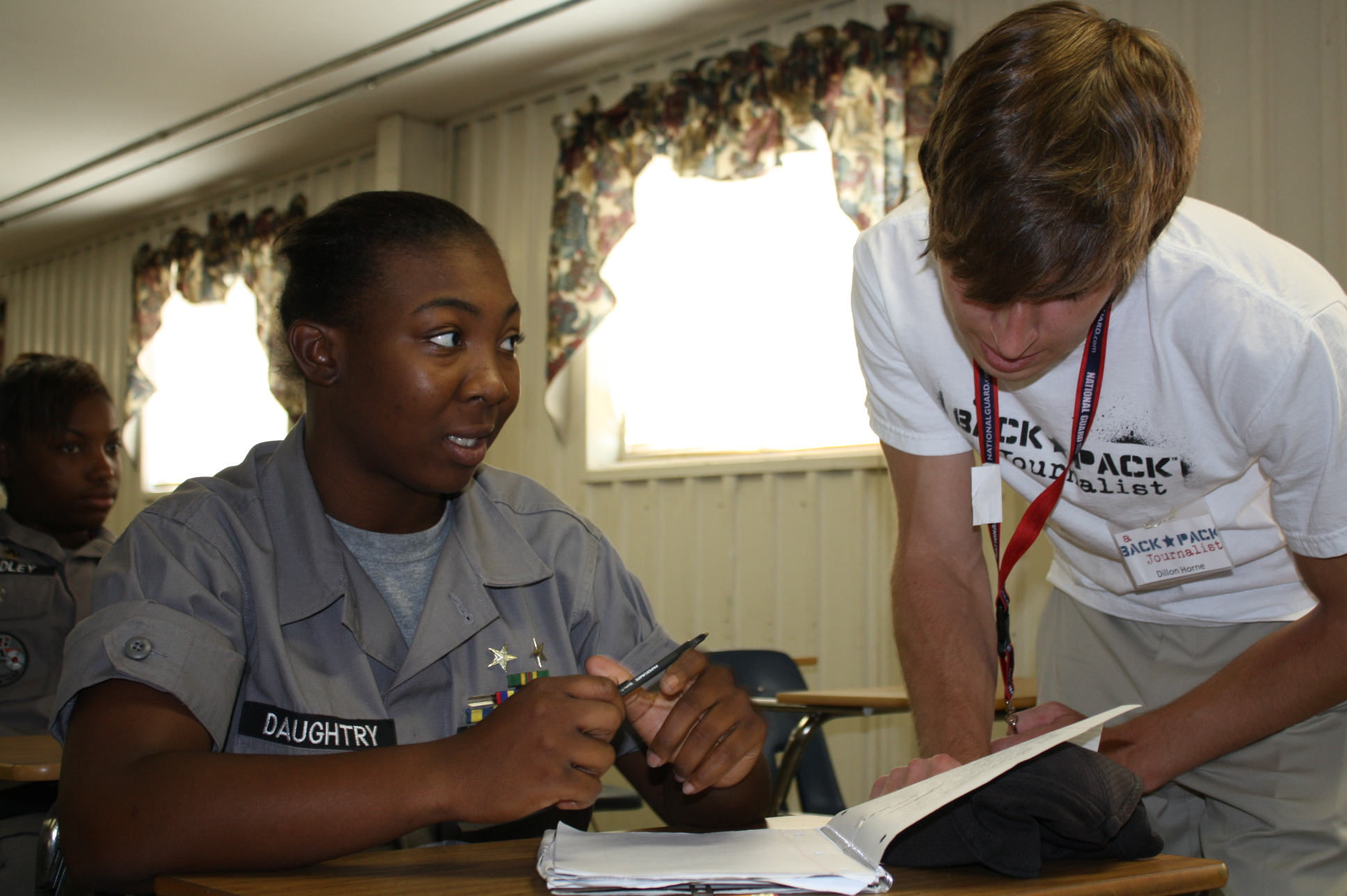
Youth ChalleNGe cadet Triana Daughtry of Augusta reviews her writing with "A Backpack Journalist" instructor Dillon Horne during a free-verse poetry course.

== See also ==
- Civil Air Patrol
- Exploring (Learning for Life)
- Junior Reserve Officers' Training Corps
- United States Naval Sea Cadet Corps
- Young Marines
