= 13th Coast Artillery (United States) =

13th Coast Artillery Regiment
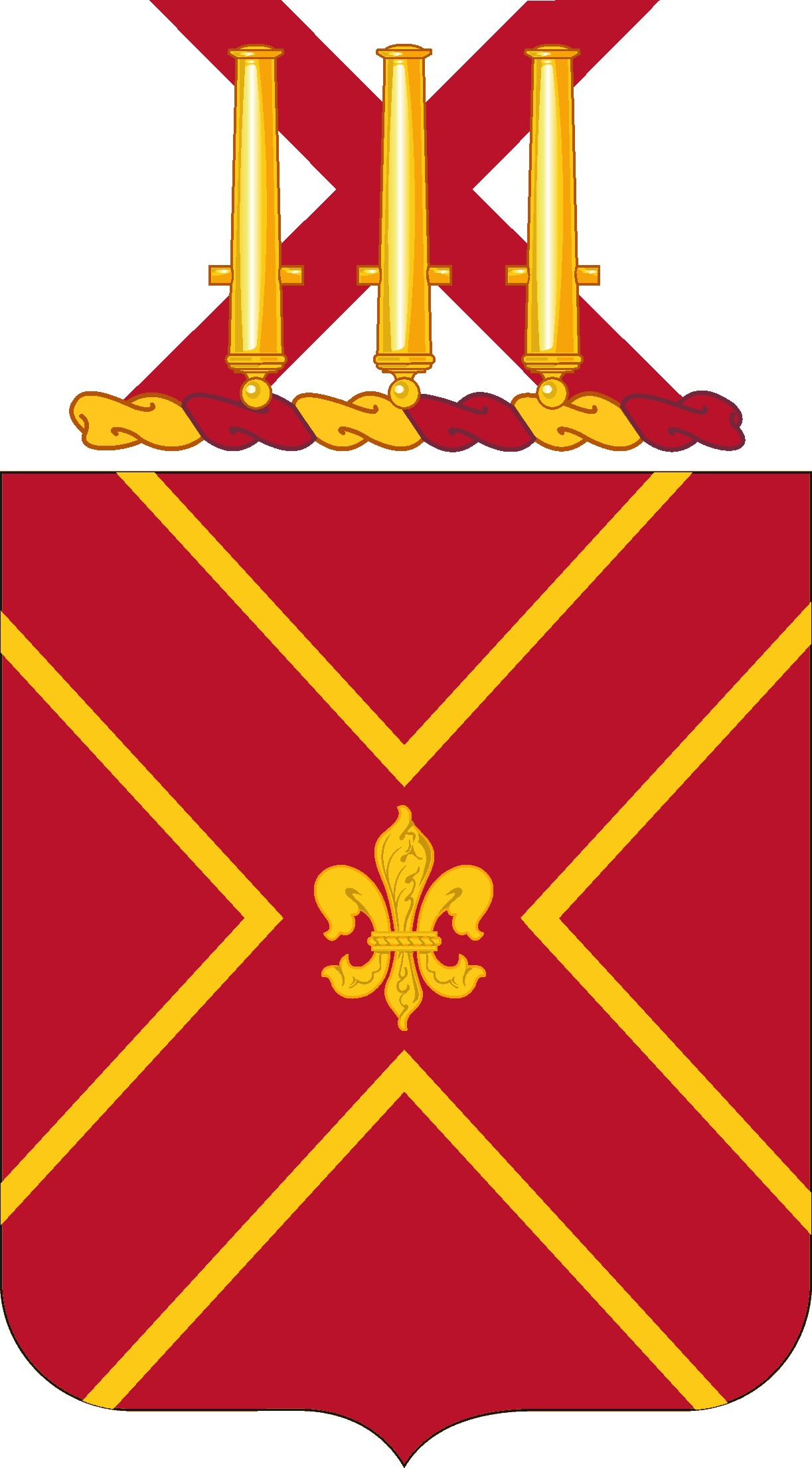
- Coat of arms
- Active: 1924–1944
- Country: United States
- Branch: Army
- Type: Coast artillery
- Role: Harbor defense
- Size: Regiment
- Garrison/HQ: Fort Barrancas, Florida
- Motto(s): "Quod Habemus Defendmus" We Defend What We Have
- Mascot(s): Oozlefinch
- Engagements: World War II

The 13th Coast Artillery Regiment was a Coast Artillery regiment in the United States Army. Elements of the regiment served during World War II in the Harbor Defenses of Pensacola (HD Pensacola), HD Key West, HD Galveston, HD Charleston, Temporary HD of New Orleans, and in Bora Bora in the South Pacific. The regiment was broken up and its elements redesignated on 31 August 1944 as part of an Army-wide reorganization.

== Lineage ==
Constituted in the Regular Army 27 February 1924 as 13th Coast Artillery (Harbor Defense) (HD), and organized 1 July 1924 at Fort Barrancas in HD Pensacola, Florida by redesignating the following companies of the Coast Artillery Corps (CAC): 121st, 145th, 162nd, 163rd, 170th, 179th, 180th, 181st, 182nd, 183rd, and 188th.

- Regimental Headquarters and Headquarters Battery (HHB) and Battery A assigned to Fort Barrancas.
- Battery B assigned to Fort Pickens, Florida (HD Pensacola).
- Battery D assigned to Fort Moultrie, South Carolina (HD Charleston), caretaking battery.
- Battery E assigned to Key West Barracks, Florida (HD Key West), caretaking battery.
- Battery G assigned to Fort Crockett in HD Galveston, Texas, caretaking battery.
- 1st Battalion HHB activated 8 January 1940 at Key West Barracks.
- Battery G inactivated January 1940, personnel used to activate HHB 20th Coast Artillery at Fort Crockett.
- 3rd Battalion HHB activated 15 January 1941 at Fort Barrancas.

On 15 January 1942 3rd battalion activated with Batteries F and H, moved to Charleston Port of Embarkation, and as part of Task Force 5614 sailed 27 January 1942 for Bora Bora in French Polynesia, South Pacific, arrived there 27 February 1942 as part of Operation Bobcat.

- HHB 3rd Battalion and Batteries F and H inactivated 5 October 1942, personnel used to activate the 276th Coast Artillery Battalion in Bora Bora, inactive units returned (less personnel and equipment) to the 13th Coast Artillery at Fort Barrancas.
- On 23 April 1942 Key West elements transferred to Camp Pendleton and reassigned to 53rd Coast Artillery (155 mm gun), which was then mobilizing.
- In late July 1942, a detachment of Regimental HHB and Batteries B and D were sent to Burrwood, Louisiana to establish Temporary HD (THD) of New Orleans and maintain searchlight positions of Battery H at Port Eads and South Pass at the mouth of the Mississippi River.
- 1st Battalion HHB and Battery E inactivated at Fort Story 20 July 1942, then reactivated and assigned to THD of New Orleans November 1942.
- Battery D inactivated at Fort Moultrie 23 April 1942, personnel transferred to 263rd Coast Artillery.
- Batteries G, H, and I inactivated 31 May 1944.

In mid-August 1944, regiment broken up as follows:

- HHB 13th Coast Artillery redesignated HHB HD Pensacola.
- HHB 1st Battalion reconstituted, reactivated, and redesignated as HQ and HQ Detachment 13th Coast Artillery Battalion (HD), and assigned to operate THD New Orleans at Burrwood, Louisiana.
- Battery A redesignated Battery C, 13th CA Battalion.
- Battery B redesignated Battery A, 181st Coast Artillery Battalion.
- Battery C redesignated Battery B, 13th Coast Artillery Battalion.
- HHB 2nd Battalion reorganized and redesignated HHB 13th Coast Artillery Battalion.
- Battery D inactivated 31 August 1944 and disbanded.
- Battery E redesignated Battery B 181st Coast Artillery Battalion.
- Battery F redesignated Battery A 13th Coast Artillery Battalion.
- HHB 3rd Battalion and Batteries G, H, and I inactivated and disbanded.
- Battery K redesignated Battery K (searchlight), HD Pensacola.

13th and 181st Coast Artillery Battalions inactivated 1 April 1945.

== Distinctive unit insignia ==
- Description

A Gold color metal and enamel device 1 1/8 inches (2.9 cm) in height consisting of a shield blazoned: Gules on a saltire Or voided of the field a fleur-de-lis of the second. Attached below and to the sides of the shield a Gold scroll inscribed "QUOD HABEMUS DEFENDEMUS" in Black letters.

- Symbolism

The red of the shield signifies Air Defense Artillery. The outline in gold of the saltire or diagonal cross denotes that the Regiment was organized in the south; viz: The Coast Defenses of Charleston, Pensacola, Key West and Galveston. The saltire is taken from the battle flag of the Confederacy and, as only its outline appears on the shield, denotes a suggestion of the south. The fleur-de-lis stands for the service in France of the 121st Company, C.A.C. (Battery C, 61st Regiment, C.A.C.). The motto translates to "What We Hold We Will Defend."

- Background

The distinctive unit insignia was originally approved for the 13th Coast Artillery Regiment on 11 August 1924. It was redesignated for the 13th Artillery Group on 20 November 1967. The insignia was amended to add the motto on 20 November 1967. It was redesignated for the 13th Air Defense Artillery Group on 4 April 1972.

== Coat of arms ==
=== Blazon ===
- Shield

Gules on a saltire Or voided of the field a fleur-de-lis of the second (Or).

- Crest

On a wreath of the colors Or and Gules, a saltire Gules charged with three cannon paleways Or. Motto QUOD HABEMUS DEFENDEMUS (What We Hold We Will Defend).

=== Symbolism ===
- Shield

The red of the shield signifies Artillery. The outline in gold of the saltire or diagonal cross denotes that the Regiment was organized in the south; viz; The Coast Defenses of Charleston, Pensacola, Key West and Galveston. The saltire is taken from the battle flag of the Confederacy and, as only its outline appears on the shield, denotes a suggestion of the south. The fleur-de-lis stands for the service in France of the 121st Company, C.A.C. (Battery C, 61st Artillery, C.A.C.)

- Crest

The red saltire represents the Regiment being organized in the south and the three cannons symbolize Artillery.

=== Background ===
The coat of arms was approved on 9 August 1924.

== Campaign streamers ==
American Defense Service Medal
American Campaign Medal
World War II Victory Medal (United States)

== Decorations ==
none

== See also ==
- Distinctive unit insignia (U.S. Army)
- Seacoast defense in the United States
- United States Army Coast Artillery Corps
- Harbor Defense Command
