= United States Army Coast Artillery Corps =

Former administrative corps and coastal artillery branch of the U.S. Army

U.S. Army Coast Artillery Corps
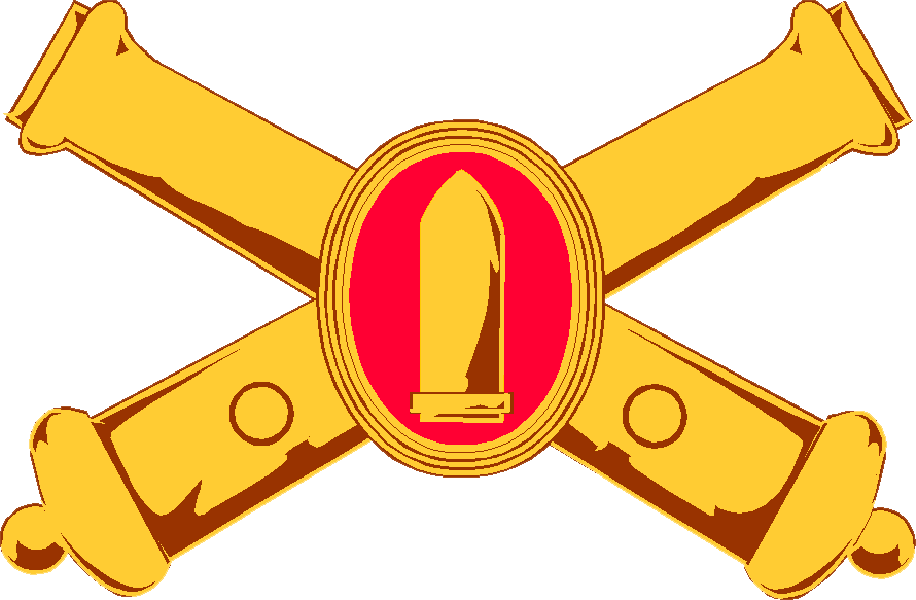
- Active: 1901–1950
- Country: United States of America
- Branch: United States Army
- Garrison/HQ: Fort Monroe
- Patron: Saint Barbara
- Colors: Scarlet
- Mascot: Oozlefinch

Commanders
- Notable commanders: Chiefs of Coast Artillery

The U.S. Army Coast Artillery Corps (CAC) was an administrative corps responsible for coastal, harbor, and anti-aircraft defense of the United States and its possessions between 1901 and 1950. The CAC also operated heavy and railway artillery during World War I.

== History ==
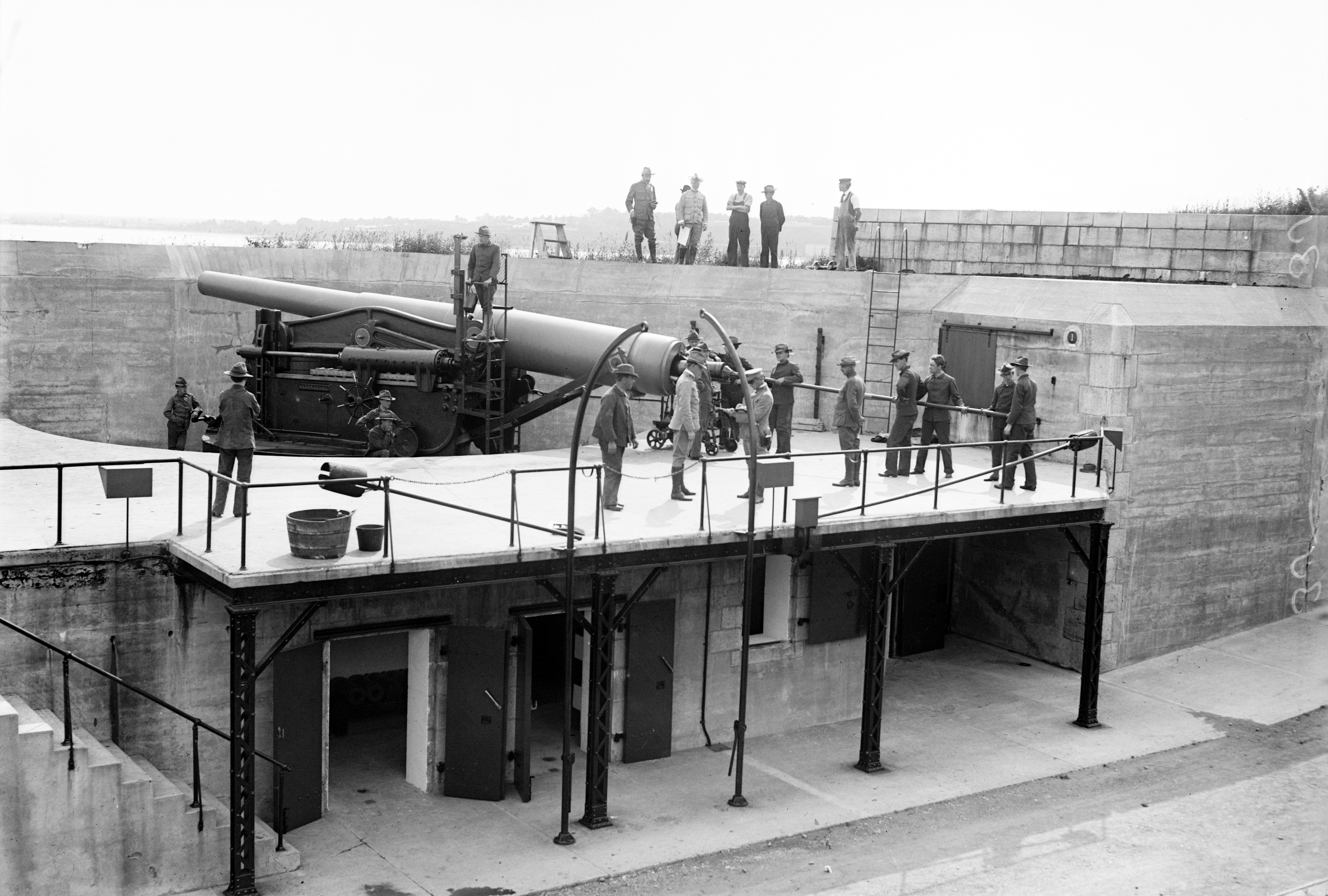
Practice loading of a 10-inch gun on a disappearing carriage at Fort Hamilton, Brooklyn, NY, a typical Endicott period installation.

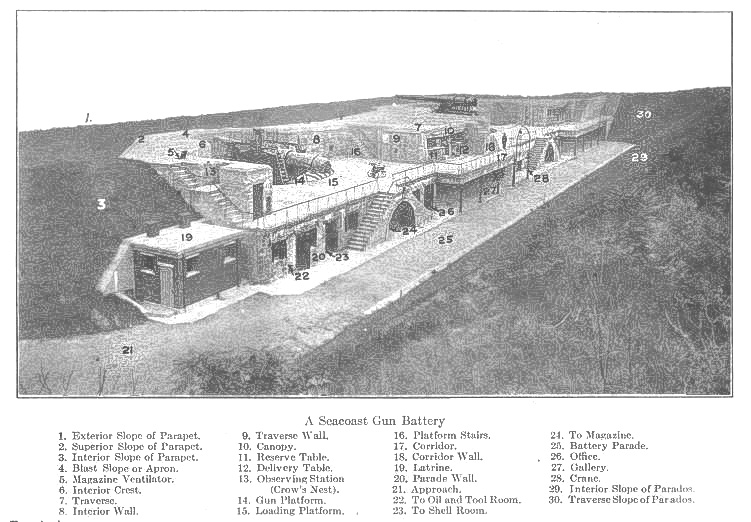
Typical Endicott period battery with components labeled.

As early as 1882 the need for heavy fixed artillery for seacoast defense was noted in Chester A. Arthur's Second Annual Message to Congress where he noted:

"I call your attention to the recommendation of the Secretary and the board that authority be given to construct two more cruisers of smaller dimensions and one fleet dispatch vessel, and that appropriations be made for high-power rifled cannon for the torpedo service and for other harbor defenses."

In 1885 the Endicott Board was convened under the subsequent Grover Cleveland administration, chaired by Secretary of War William Crowninshield Endicott. This board recommended a large-scale program of harbor defenses at 29 ports, including guns, mortars, and mine fields. Most of their recommendations were implemented and new defenses were constructed by the United States Army Corps of Engineers between 1895 and 1905. As the defenses were constructed, each harbor or river's installations were controlled by Artillery Districts, renamed Coast Defense Commands in 1913 and Harbor Defense Commands in 1925. With the 1913 renaming, Artillery Districts became regional commands, each including several coast defense commands.

An extensive fire control system was developed and provided for the forts of each Artillery District.

=== 1901 reorganization ===
Army leaders realized that heavy fixed artillery required different training programs and tactics than mobile field artillery. Prior to 1901 each of the seven Regular Army artillery regiments contained both heavy and light artillery batteries. In February 1901 the Artillery Corps was divided into two types: field artillery and coast artillery. The previous seven artillery regiments were dissolved, and 30 numbered companies of field artillery (commonly called batteries) and 126 numbered companies of coast artillery (CA) were authorized. 82 existing heavy artillery batteries were designated as coast artillery companies, and 44 new CA companies were created by splitting existing units and filling their ranks with recruits. The company-based organization was for flexibility, as each harbor defense command was differently equipped and a task-based organization was needed. The Coast Artillery would alternate between small unit and regimental organization several times over its history. The head of the Artillery Corps became the Chief of Artillery in the rank of brigadier general with jurisdiction over both types of artillery.

=== Controlled mine fields ===
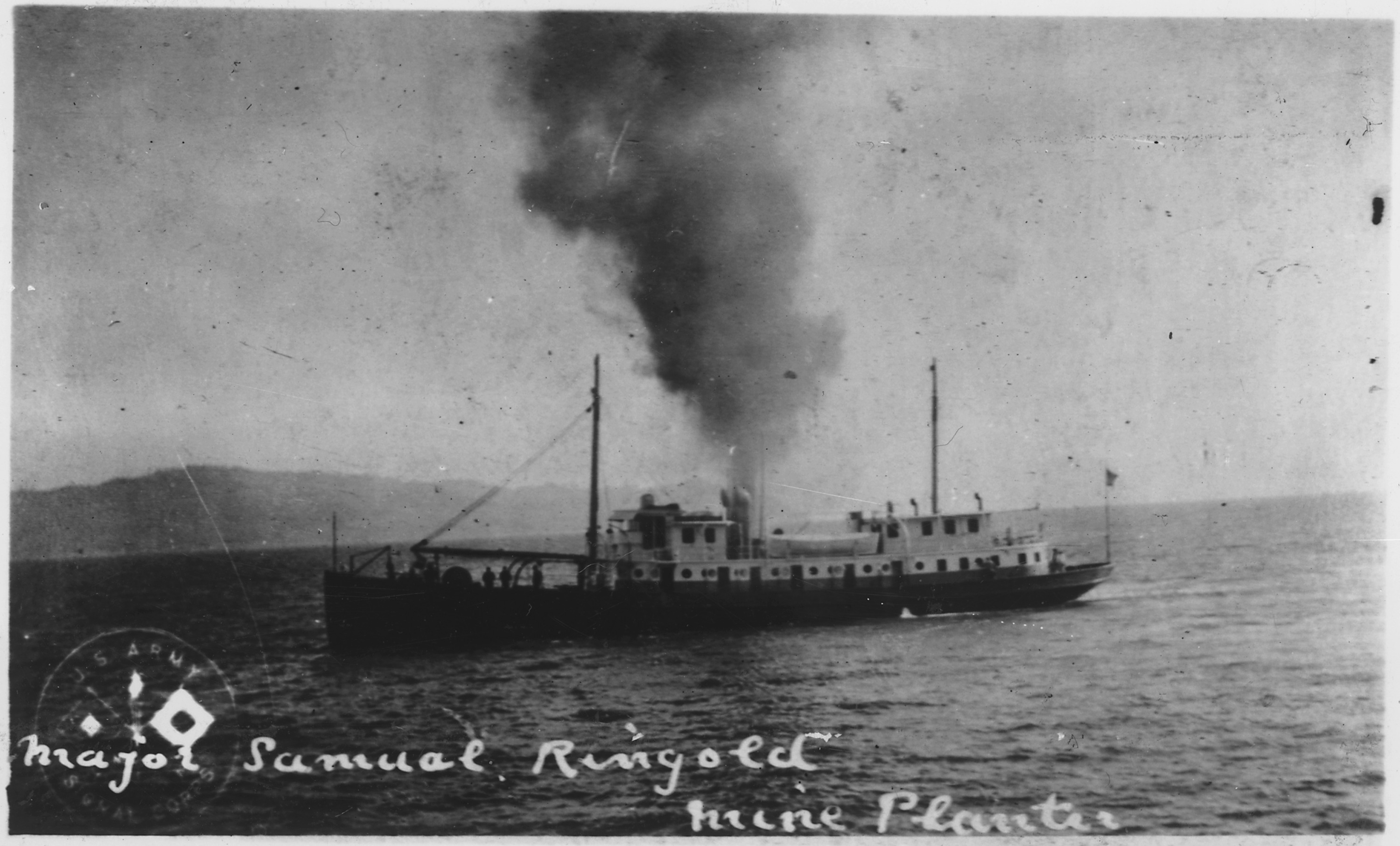
USAMP Major Samuel Ringgold, built in 1904, which planted practice groups of mines in the Columbia River during the 1920s. (National Archives and Records Administration)

c. 1901 the Coast Artillery took responsibility for the installation and operation of the controlled mine fields from the Corps of Engineers; these were planted to be under observation, remotely detonated electrically, and protected by fixed guns. With that responsibility the Coast Artillery began to acquire the vessels required to plant and maintain the minefields and cables connecting the mines to the mine casemate ashore organized as a "Submarine Mine Battery" within the installation command, "submarine" meaning "underwater" in this case. The larger vessels, called "mine planters", were civilian crewed until the creation of the U.S. Army Mine Planter Service (AMPS) and Warrant Officer Corps in 1918 to provide officers and engineers for the ships designated as mine planters. The mine component was considered to be among the principal armament of coastal defense works.

=== Taft Board and the creation of the Coast Artillery Corps ===
In 1905, after the experiences of the Spanish–American War, President Theodore Roosevelt appointed a new board on fortifications, under Secretary of War William Howard Taft. They updated some standards and reviewed the progress of the Endicott board's program. Most of the changes recommended by this board were technical; such as adding more searchlights, electrification (lighting, communications, and projectile handling), and more sophisticated optical aiming techniques. The board also recommended fortifications in territories acquired from Spain: Cuba and the Philippines, as well as Hawaii and a few other sites. Defenses in Panama were authorized by the Spooner Act of 1902. Due to rapid development of the dreadnought battleship type, a new 14-inch (356 mm) gun was introduced in a few locations, including Los Angeles, the Philippines, Hawaii, and Panama. The Japanese were acquiring capital ships with guns of this caliber, beginning with Kongō in 1913. The Taft program fortifications differed slightly in battery construction and had fewer numbers of guns at a given location than those of the Endicott program. By the beginning of World War I, the United States had a coastal defense system that was equal to any other nation.

The rapidity of technological advances and changing techniques increasingly separated coastal defenses (heavy) from field artillery (light). Officers were rarely qualified to command both, requiring specialization. As a result, in 1907, Congress split the Field Artillery and Coast Artillery into separate branches, creating a separate Coast Artillery Corps (CAC), and authorizing an increase in the Coast Artillery Corps to 170 numbered companies. National Guard coast artillery units were also formed by the states to attempt to bring the CAC up to strength in wartime. Confusingly, many of these units were designated Coast Artillery Corps of their respective state National Guards. In 1907 the United States Army Field Artillery School at Fort Monroe became the Coast Artillery School, which operated until 1946, and in 1908, the Chief of Artillery became the Chief of Coast Artillery in the rank of major general.

=== World War I ===
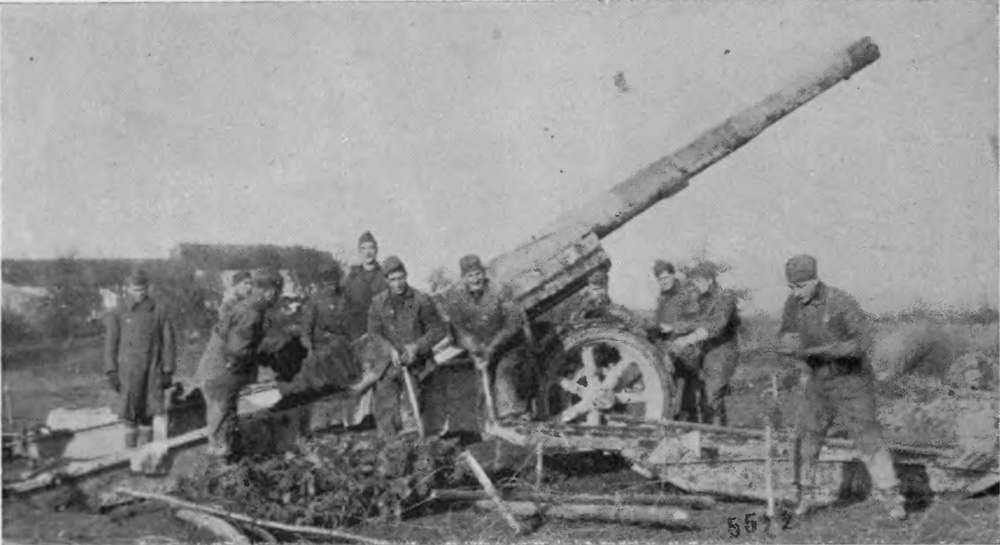
US-manned 155 mm GPF gun of Battery F, 55th Coast Artillery, France 1918

When war broke out in Europe in 1914, the Coast Artillery was undermanned and poorly equipped except for coastal artillery weapons. The War Department formed a Board of Review that recommended an increase in strength, which resulted in 105 new CA companies in 1916–17, although these were initially undermanned. After the American entry into World War I, the Coast Artillery as a whole was ordered brought up to strength, and 71 new companies were organized by July 1917.

In response to the rapid improvements in dreadnought battleships, approximately 14 two-gun batteries of 12-inch guns on a new M1917 long-range barbette carriage began construction in 1917, but none were completed until 1920.

The Coast Artillery was designated to provide the personnel for all US-manned heavy artillery (155 mm gun and larger), almost all railway artillery, and later anti-aircraft artillery units. As with most US Army World War I equipment, these units were primarily equipped with French- and British-made weapons, with few American-made heavy weapons arriving in France before the Armistice. As with other American World War I units, the CAC units operated alongside French forces for the most part. The CAC units sent to France and Britain with the American Expeditionary Forces (AEF) were organized into a total of 11 brigades comprising 33 regiments of 24 guns each, plus a replacement regiment, nine trench mortar battalions and thirteen anti-aircraft battalions (a.k.a. sectors). Many Coast Artillery companies were withdrawn from stateside coast defenses to provide cadre for the new artillery regiments. However, only 13 regiments saw action, while the remaining 20 regiments did not complete training before the Armistice, and up to 6 of these never received guns. A total of 61 regiments were organized; however, at least 23 of these were organized in the US shortly before the Armistice and were soon disbanded. The coast defense commands retained a company-based organization. Only one regiment saw action equipped with US-made guns, the 58th Coast Artillery armed with the 8-inch howitzer M1917, based on the British BL 8-inch howitzer Mk VI.

Ninety-five 6-inch guns were withdrawn from coast defenses, with an additional 46 weapons supplied by the Navy and 30 ex-Navy weapons from arms dealer Francis Bannerman. Seventy-two of the Army 6-inch guns (possibly with a few additional Navy weapons) and 26 5-inch guns also removed from coast defenses were mounted on M1917 field carriages and equipped four artillery regiments in France, but none of these completed training before the Armistice. After the war, some of the 6-inch guns were returned to coast defenses, but the 5-inch guns were withdrawn from coast defense service. Most of the 6-inch guns were stored and were eventually deployed in World War II.

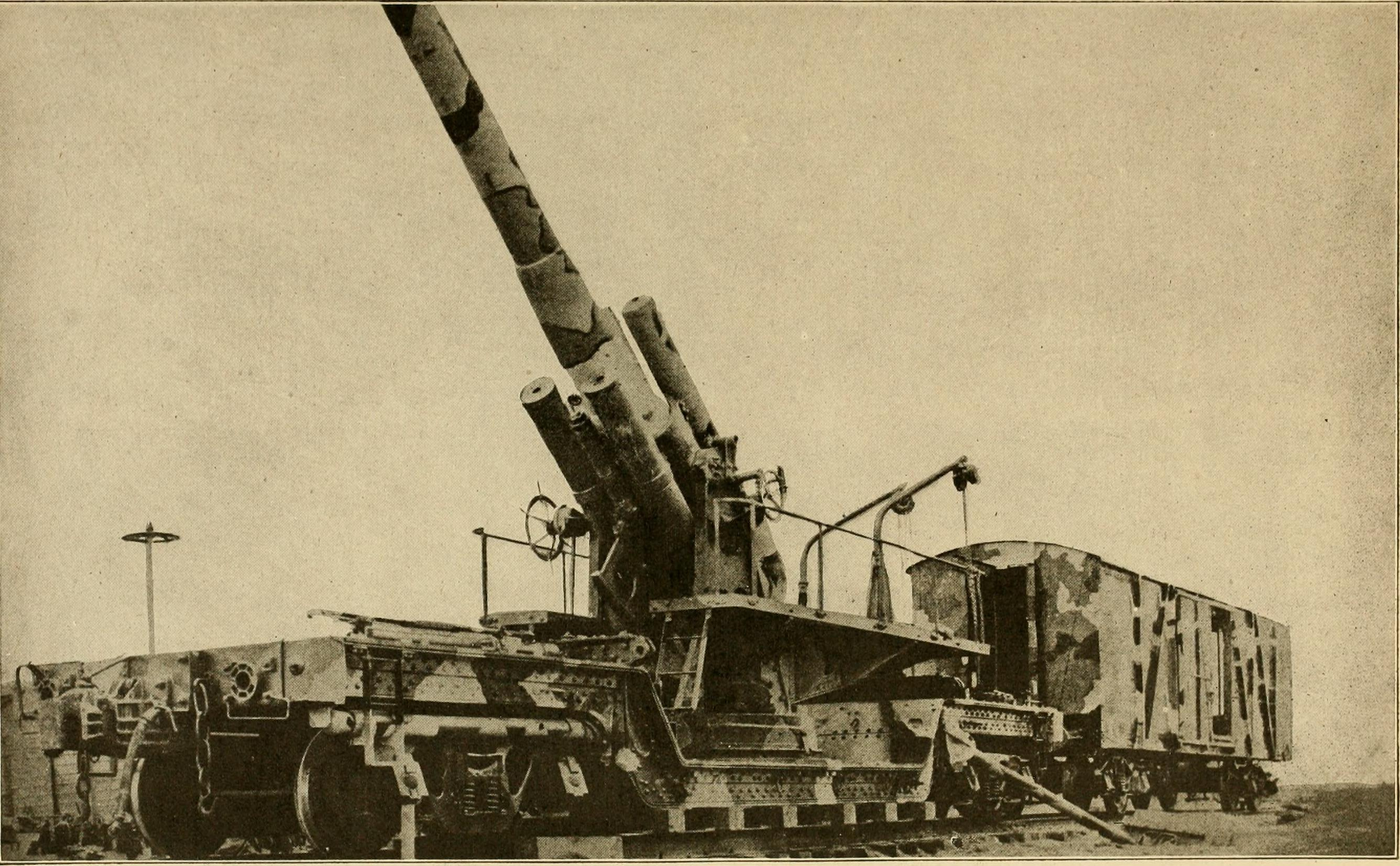
8-inch M1888 railway gun with ammunition wagon.

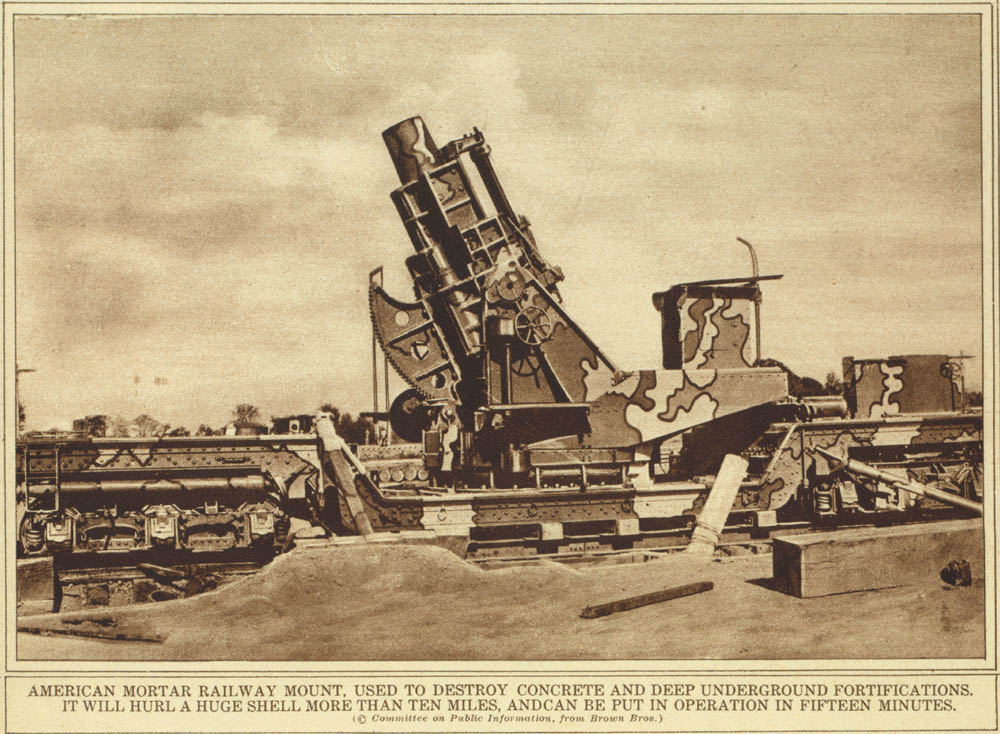
12-inch mortar on M1918 railway carriage.

No US railway guns existed when the US entered World War I in early 1917. Due to low production and shipping priorities, the Army's railway gun contribution on the Western Front consisted of four CA regiments operating French-made weapons. These were organized as the 30th Separate Artillery Brigade (Railway), also designated as the Railway Artillery Reserve (RAR), which usually operated mingled with French units in an Allied RAR. The 40th Artillery Brigade of three regiments was also a railway artillery brigade of the RAR; however, it did not complete training before the Armistice.

The US Navy manufactured and operated five 14"/50 caliber railway guns that were delivered in time to support the final Allied offensives. With a view to getting numerous US-made weapons into the fight eventually, the Army also converted some of the many US coast artillery weapons to railway mounts. A total of 96 8-inch guns, 129 10-inch guns, 49 12-inch guns, and 150 12-inch mortars could be taken from fixed coast defense batteries or spares. Twelve 7-inch ex-Navy guns and six 12-inch guns being built for Chile were also available.

None of the army weapons were shipped to France except three 8-inch guns and some 10-inch barrels (to be mounted in France), as few of any type were completed before the Armistice. Forty-seven 8-inch railway guns were ordered, with 18 completed by the Armistice and the remainder completed later. Eight 10-inch railway mounts of 54 ordered were completed by this time, and twelve 12-inch railway mounts were completed by 1 April 1919. Three railway mountings for the Chilean 12-inch guns were ready for shipment by the Armistice; the remaining three barrels were retained as spares. Ninety-one 12-inch railway mortars were ordered, with 45 complete by 7 April 1919 and all major components of the remainder also complete. It is unclear how many additional railway guns and mortars were completed, but all 47 8-inch weapons and probably the 91 12-inch mortars were. The 7-inch and 8-inch guns and 12-inch mortars used a common carriage, with outriggers and a rotating mount allowing all-around fire. This allowed the weapons to be used in coast defense against moving targets.

The 8-inch guns and 12-inch mortars were retained on railway mountings after the war, while most of the 10-inch and 12-inch guns were returned to the coastal forts. The 7-inch railway guns most likely became fixed coast artillery, although some were eventually transferred to Brazil as railway guns in 1941.

The official birthday of the Army Warrant Officer Corps is 9 July 1918, when an Act of Congress established the Army Mine Planter Service as part of the Coast Artillery Corps, replacing previous civilian manning of mine planter vessels. Implementation of the Act by the Army was published in War Department Bulletin 43, dated 22 July 1918.

=== Interwar period ===
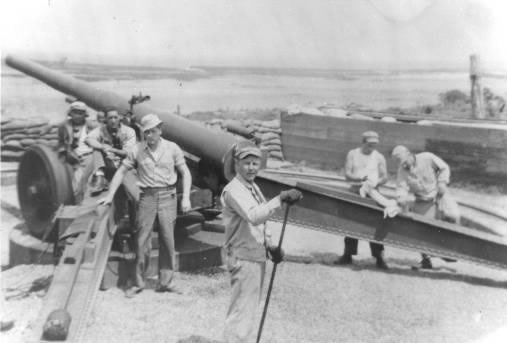
155 mm gun M1918 on Panama Mount

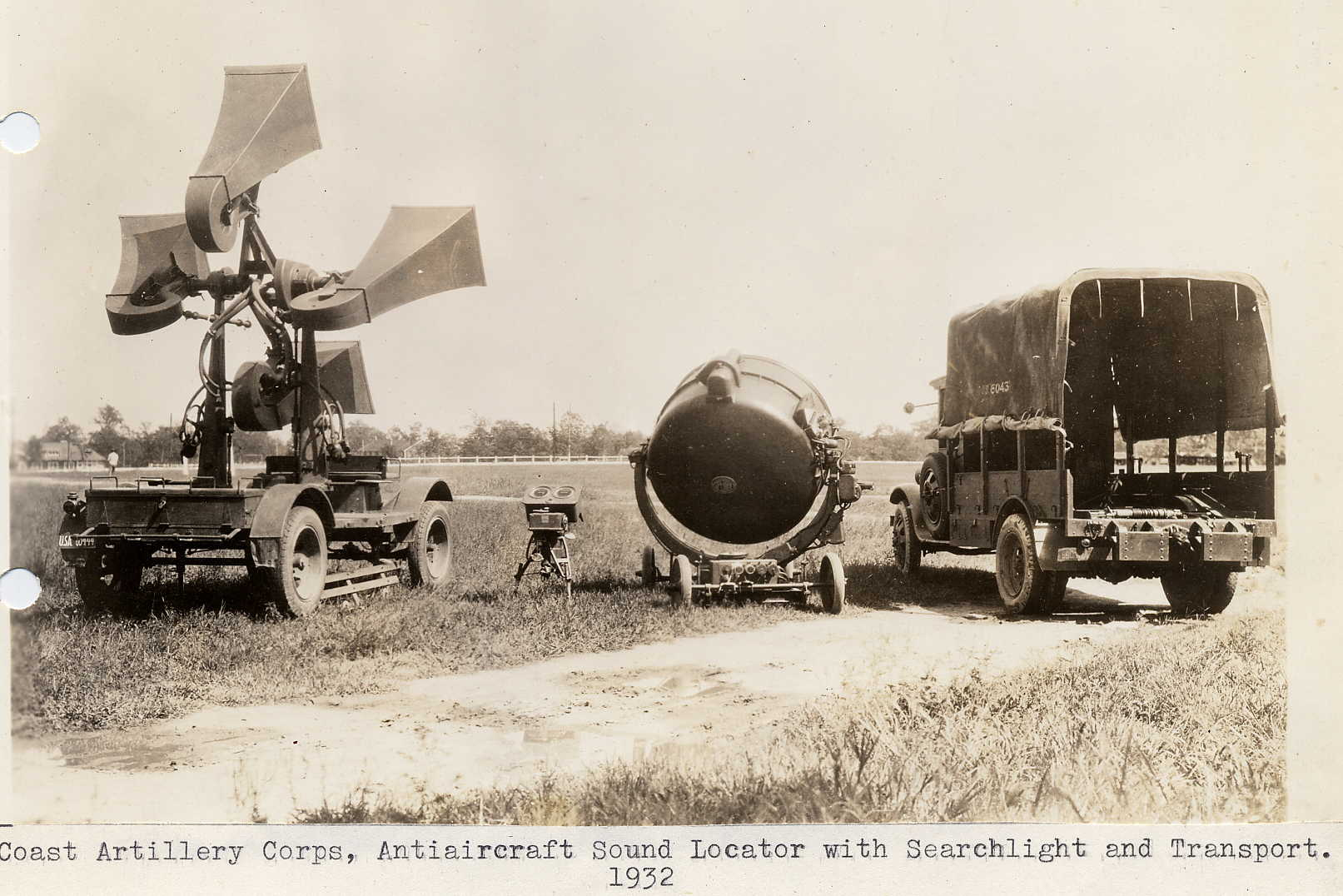
Coast Artillery Corps anti-aircraft sound locator and searchlight 1932

After World War I all but ten of the wartime regiments were disbanded. The four regiments of the 30th Railway Artillery Brigade initially remained, along with six tractor-drawn regiments equipped with the 155 mm gun M1918 (6.1 inch), developed from the French Canon de 155mm GPF (Grand Puissance Filloux, or high-powered gun designed by Filloux), a weapon these regiments used during the war. This weapon, drawn by heavy Holt tractors, introduced road and cross-country mobility to the Coast Artillery, and allowed mobile defense of areas not protected by fixed harbor defenses. Circular concrete platforms called "Panama mounts" were added to existing defenses to improve the utility of these guns. Budget reductions resulted in the disbandment of all but three of the tractor-drawn regiments and all but one railway regiment by late 1921. The anti-aircraft mission continued with three battalions in the Contiguous United States (CONUS), one battalion in the Philippines, and a regiment in Hawaii.

The railway artillery mission became a permanent role of the CA, but railway guns were not widely deployed. All 47 8-inch railway guns were deployed, but only 16 of the 91 12-inch railway mortars were deployed at any one time.

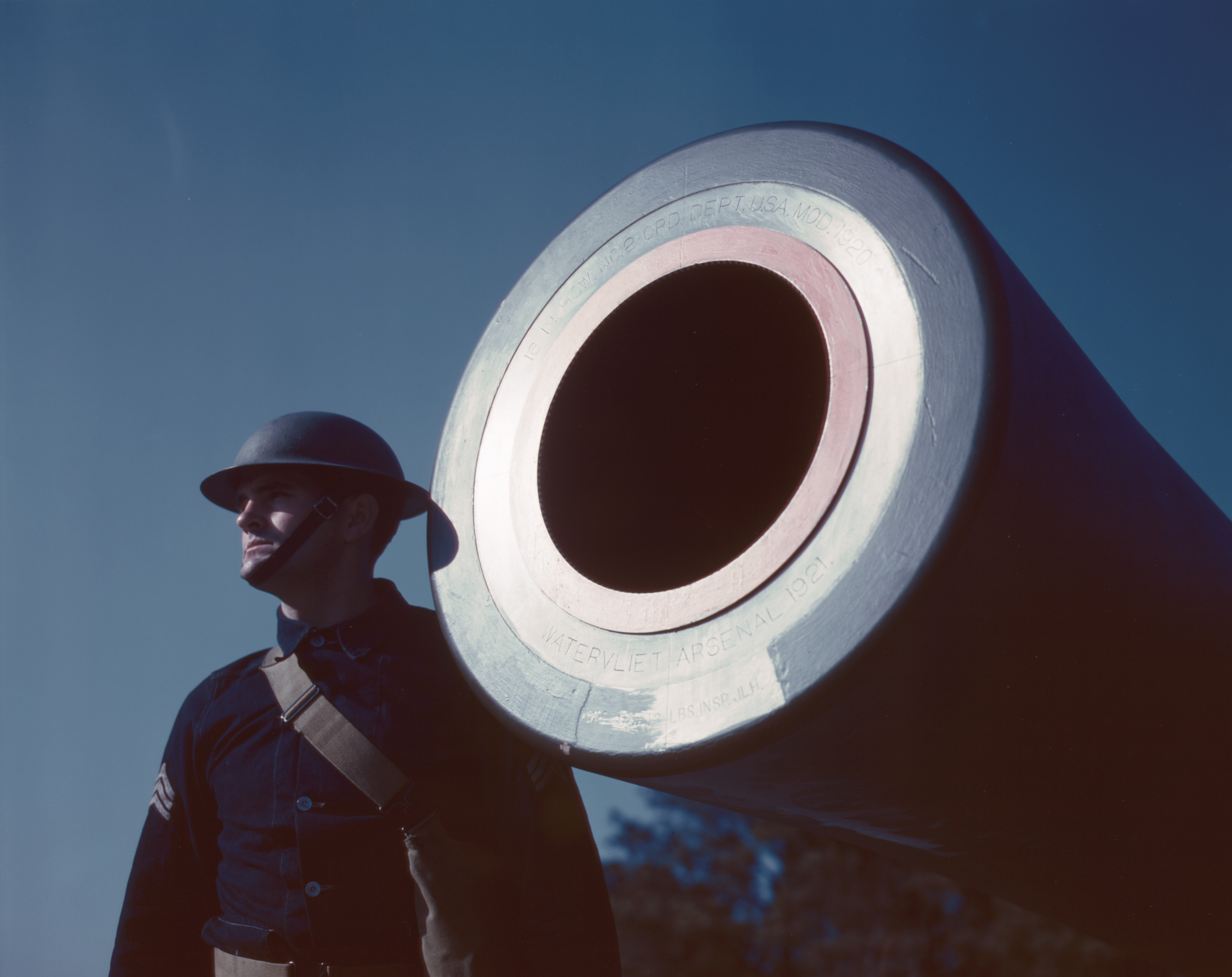
16-inch coast artillery howitzer, Fort Story, Virginia, United States 1942

Due to the continued improvement of battleships until the 1922 Washington Naval Treaty halted their construction, the Coast Artillery acquired some new 16-inch (406 mm) and 14-inch (356 mm) weapons, although in minute quantities. Based on the Coast Artillery's experience operating heavy weapons in World War I, especially the French-made 400 mm (15.75-inch) Modèle 1916 railway howitzer, new barbette carriages were designed with an elevation of 65 degrees to allow plunging fire as enemy ships approached. Only 22 16-inch and four 14-inch M1920 railway guns were deployed within the Continental United States, Hawaii, and Panama by 1940. The 16-inch guns were one 16-inch gun M1895 on a disappearing carriage, seven 16-inch M1919 guns (one on a disappearing carriage), four 16-inch M1920 howitzers, and ten 16"/50 caliber Mark 2 guns (including some Mark 3 guns), the last taken from weapons produced for South Dakota-class battleships and Lexington-class battlecruisers cancelled by the Washington Naval Treaty. Twenty of about 70 of these weapons were initially given to the Army, but funding precluded deployment of more than ten until 1940. The remaining 50 or so weapons were retained by the Navy for use on future battleships; but in 1940 a near-fiasco in the design of the Iowa-class battleships precluded their use on that class, and the guns were released to the Army.

A postwar weapon deployed in more reasonable quantities was the 12-inch gun M1895 on the long-range barbette carriage M1917. These were the same guns found in Endicott period installations, but on a high-angle carriage that increased their range from 18,400 yd (16,800 m) on a disappearing carriage at 15° elevation to 29,300 yd (26,800 m) at 35° elevation. Thirty guns were deployed in 16 batteries, including two one-gun batteries in the Philippines, all completed by 1924. These were the last guns added to the Philippine defenses until 1940, as the Washington Naval Treaty prohibited additional fortifications in the Pacific.

US Army Coastal Artillery Districts as of October 5, 1920
					Hawaiian separate Coast Artillery Brigade
I Corps	II Corps	III Corps	IV Corps	IX Corps	Hawaii
New England	New York, New Jersey, Pennsylvania, Delaware	Maryland, Virginia and North Carolina	North Carolina, South Carolina, Georgia, Florida, Alabama, Mississippi, Louisiana and Texas	California, Oregon, Washington and Alaska	Hawaiian Separate Coast Artillery Brigade (1936-1945)

In 1922 fifteen companies of Philippine Scouts coast artillery were established. These units were composed primarily of Filipino enlisted men and US officers, and garrisoned many of the coast defenses in the Philippines until the surrender of US forces there in 1942.

Also in 1922, the Journal of the United States Artillery was renamed the Coast Artillery Journal.

In 1923–1924, the Coast Artillery adopted a regimental system forcewide, which included the Regular Army, National Guard, and Organized Reserve components (see "Units" section below). This lasted until the anti-aircraft regiments were broken up into battalions in 1943-44 and the harbor defense regiments were similarly broken up by late 1944. On 9 June 1925 the Coast Defense Commands were redesignated as Harbor Defense Commands via a War Department order.

By the end of the 1920s, eight Harbor Defense Commands in less-threatened areas were completely disarmed. These included the defenses of the Kennebec River (Maine), Baltimore (Maryland), Potomac River (Maryland and Virginia), Cape Fear River (North Carolina), Savannah (Georgia), Tampa Bay (Florida), Mobile (Alabama), and the Mississippi River (Louisiana). The mine capability may have been retained in reserve at these defenses. Some of these installations were rearmed with "Panama mounts" for towed artillery early in World War II.

The new 16-inch and 12-inch batteries of the 1920s were all in open mounts, unprotected against air attack except for camouflage. Like the Endicott and Taft period emplacements, they were positioned to be hidden from observation from the sea, but were open to the air. This somewhat inexplicable situation was remedied by casemating most of the newer batteries early in World War II.

=== World War II ===
The outbreak of war in Europe in September 1939 and the Fall of France in June 1940 greatly accelerated US defense planning and funding. About this time a severe lack of design coordination resulted in the Iowa-class battleships being unable to use the Mark 2 and Mark 3 16-inch guns, and a new gun design was required for them. With war on the horizon, the Navy released the approximately 50 remaining guns, and on 27 July 1940 the Army's Harbor Defense Board recommended the construction of 27 (eventually 38) 16-inch two-gun batteries to protect strategic points along the US coastline, to be casemated against air attack. However, as the war's progress greatly reduced the threat from enemy surface vessels, only 21 of these were completed, and not all of them were armed.

The 16-inch guns were only the top end of the World War II program, which eventually replaced almost all previous coast defense weapons with newer (or remounted) weapons. Generally, each harbor defense command was to have two or three 16-inch or 12-inch long-range batteries, plus 6-inch guns on new mountings with protected magazines, and 90 mm Anti Motor Torpedo Boat (AMTB) guns. Activation of the National Guard and expansion of regular harbor defense regiments to wartime strength resulted in 45,000 troops assigned to this function by fall 1941. Including field artillery units deployed in coast defense, harbor defense forces peaked at 70,000 troops from spring 1942 until mid-1943. In 1943–44, with most of the new defenses completed, the numerous older weapons of the Endicott and Taft periods were scrapped, with their crews largely reassigned to field artillery units.

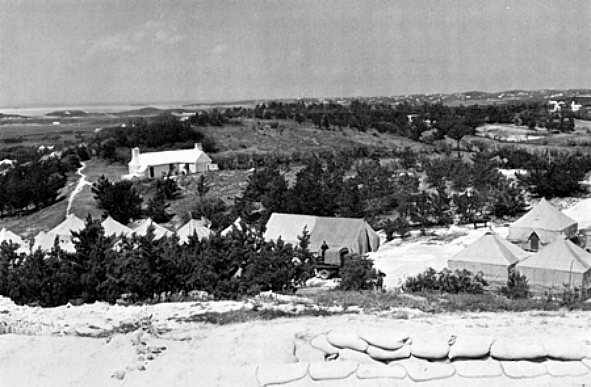
"B" Battery, 57th Coast Artillery Regiment, at Ackermann's Hill (or Turtle Hill), in the British Army's Warwick Camp, in Bermuda during the Second World War

Bermuda

Although the British colony of Bermuda had been heavily fortified over the previous centuries, and hundreds of artillery pieces had been emplaced, most were hopelessly obsolete. Of the newer guns, only two batteries, each of two 6-inch guns, were in serviceable condition (at St. David's Battery and Warwick Camp, both manned by the Bermuda Militia Artillery). Consequently, among the first American units deployed to Bermuda were batteries of artillery at Cooper's Island, Fort Albert and Fort Victoria on St. George's Island, Fort Langton at Prospect Camp, Warwick Camp, Tudor Hill, and also Scaur Hill Fort on Somerset Island. Subunits included "B" Battery, 57th Regiment, United States Army Coast Artillery Corps, deployed to Ackermann's Hill at Warwick Camp in 1941 with two 155 mm GPF artillery guns on wheeled carriages, which were placed on "Panama mounts" by October 1941. All US Army defenses outside the leased baselands were withdrawn from Bermuda on the end of hostilities.

After Pearl Harbor

The attack on Pearl Harbor showed that the Coast Artillery, despite the inclusion of the anti-aircraft mission, was ineffective against a mass air attack. Pre-war anti-aircraft planning had been very inadequate, with few weapons allocated, and the coast defense guns had become almost irrelevant. They were positioned to keep enemy ships out of a friendly harbor, but that was all they could accomplish. The Japanese invaded the Philippines shortly after Pearl Harbor, bringing the Harbor Defenses of Manila and Subic Bays into the war along with the other US and Filipino forces in the archipelago. The Japanese initially landed in northern Luzon, far from the defenses of Manila Bay. Although the Coast Artillery did their best, their weapons were poorly positioned against the direction of enemy attacks and vulnerable to air and high-angle artillery attack. Eight 8-inch railway guns had been deployed to the Philippines in 1940, but six were destroyed by air attack while entrained in response to the initial landings, and the other two were placed in fixed mountings on Corregidor and Bataan, but lacked crews and ammunition. The 14-inch turret guns of Fort Drum and the 12-inch mortars of Battery Way and Battery Geary were probably the most effective coast defense weapons in the Battle of Corregidor, but all but two of the mortars were knocked out before the Japanese landed on the island. The US and Filipino forces surrendered on 6 May 1942, after destroying their weapons.

The Coast Artillery faced two priorities during the war: mobilization and modernization. The National Guard was mobilized in 1940 and the Reserve units were mobilized in 1942. Most of the reserve regiments not designated as anti-aircraft in 1925 appear to have been disbanded by World War II. Besides new construction at most harbor defenses, the standard anti-aircraft gun was upgraded from the 3-inch gun M3 to the 90 mm gun M1. Except for the early-war fighting in the Philippines, the anti-aircraft branch was the Coast Artillery's only contribution on the front lines of World War II; almost all mobile heavy artillery overseas was operated by the Field Artillery.

Two times a post-1895 military base in the continental United States came under attack were the bombardments of Dutch Harbor, Alaska and Fort Stevens, Oregon by the Imperial Japanese Navy in June 1942. For the former, members of the 206th Coast Artillery Regiment lost seven during the battle in which the Japanese planes inflicted moderate damage to the base. For the latter, battery Russell was attacked with a deck gun from the Japanese submarine I-25, but the fort's commander did not return fire, since his fire control equipment indicated the submarine was out of range, and for fear of revealing the battery's position. Other than some severed telephone cables, no significant damage to either side occurred.

In late 1942, the War Department decided that to free up more younger and physically fit troops for frontline duty, harbor defense and anti-aircraft units in the continental United States would be staffed primarily with "limited service" troops, who generally were not permitted to serve on the front lines due to age or disability. Since Coast Artillery units were allowed to exceed authorized personnel strength while making the transition, understrength batteries were brought up to their authorized manning levels for the duration of the war. Reassigned former Coast Artillery troops usually went to field artillery or anti-aircraft units.

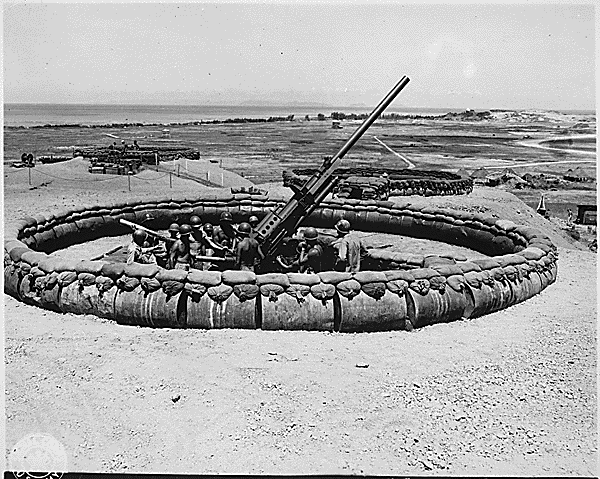
View of 90 mm anti-aircraft gun emplacement, Okinawa, 1945.

The regiments were broken up into battalions in 1943–44, in line with an Army-wide policy for all units except infantry, and a number of former Coast Artillery units were converted into heavy field artillery units. In 1944, with about two-thirds of the initially projected new batteries complete and most naval threats neutralized or destroyed, work was stopped on the remaining new batteries. Except for some 6-inch pedestal guns and 3-inch guns, the Endicott- and Taft-period guns were scrapped and the Coast Artillery Corps drawn down in size. When the war ended it was decided that few (and soon no) gun defenses were needed, and by 1948 almost all of the seacoast defenses had been scrapped. With only the anti-aircraft mission left, the Coast Artillery was disestablished and the anti-aircraft and field artillery branches were merged in 1950. Some of the mine planter vessels were transferred to the Navy and designated Auxiliary Minelayers (ACM, later MMA). The anti-aircraft and field artillery branches were later separated again and regiments eventually re-appeared. In the 1950s through early 1970s, the Anti-Aircraft Command and its successors operated the Nike-Ajax and Nike-Hercules missiles that, along with the United States Air Force's BOMARC, were the successors to the Coast Artillery in defending the US continent and friendly countries. Today the Air Defense Artillery carries the Coast Artillery's lineage, including many regiment numbers and the Oozlefinch mascot.

== Chiefs of Coast Artillery ==
The Office of the Chief of Coast Artillery was established in the rank of major general 1 July 1908 until it was abolished 9 March 1942, with functions transferred to the Commanding General, Army Ground Forces, effective 9 March 1942, by Circular 59, War Department, 2 March 1942.

Image	Rank	Name	Begin date	End date	Notes
	Major General	Arthur Murray	1 July 1908	14 March 1911	
	Major General	Erasmus M. Weaver Jr.	15 March 1911	28 May 1918	
	Major General	Frank W. Coe	29 May 1918	19 March 1926	
	Major General	Andrew Hero Jr.	20 March 1926	21 March 1930	
	Major General	John W. Gulick	22 March 1930	21 March 1934	
	Major General	William F. Hase	26 March 1934	20 January 1935	
	Major General	Harry L. Steele	21 January 1935	31 March 1936	
	Major General	Archibald H. Sunderland	1 April 1936	31 March 1940	
	Major General	Joseph A. Green	1 April 1940	9 March 1942	

== Units ==
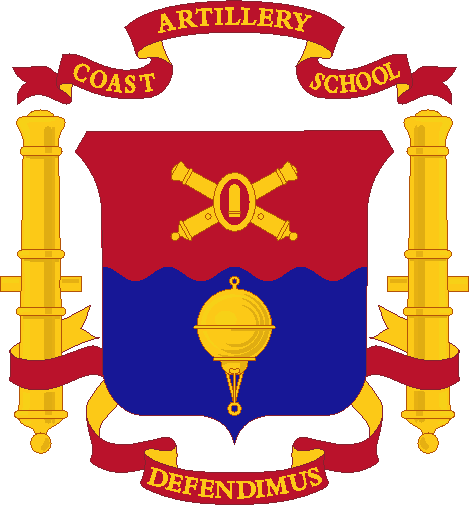
Coast Artillery School device

In 1901, the regimental organization of the US Army artillery was abolished. More companies were added, and given numerical designations.

- 126 companies of heavy (coast) artillery
- 30 companies of light (field) artillery

In 1907 the Coast Artillery Corps was established and the Field Artillery was re-regimented

- 1st Field Artillery Regiment (United States)
- up to 320th

The Corps constantly reorganized the numbered companies until 1924, but during World War I created 61 regiments and 16 brigade headquarters with many of the numbered companies as cadre, for service operating heavy and railway artillery with the American Expeditionary Forces (AEF) on the Western Front in France. 34 of these regiments and 11 brigade headquarters served in France; the remainder stayed in the United States. Most of these were disbanded immediately after the war. Also during World War I, the antiaircraft branch was born, with thirteen AA battalions (also called sectors) and six AA machine gun battalions. This mission was formally assigned to the Coast Artillery Corps in 1920.

In 1924 the Coast Artillery Corps returned to the regimental system, and the numbered companies were returned to letter designations. In order to promote esprit-de-corps, the first seven regiments inherited the lineage of the original seven regiments of artillery. The Regular Army had 17 harbor defense regiments (one of Philippine Scouts), four tractor-drawn regiments (one of Philippine Scouts), three railway regiments, and six anti-aircraft regiments. The National Guard had 10 harbor defense regiments, two tractor-drawn regiments, and nine anti-aircraft regiments. In the Organized Reserve, there was 14 harbor defense regiments, four railway regiments, three tractor-drawn regiments, and 42 anti-aircraft regiments in 8 AA brigades. However, many of the Reserve units had only small numbers of, or widely dispersed, personnel assigned, which hampered effective training. Many were demobilized before being initiated (activated) in the 1920s and 1930s or after U.S. entry into World War II, or served in that war under different designations.

=== Regular Army ===
- 16 harbor defense regiments
  - 1st Coast Artillery (HD) - Harbor Defenses of Cristobal, Panama
  - 2nd Coast Artillery (HD) - Harbor Defenses of Cristobal, Panama
  - 3rd Coast Artillery (HD) - Harbor Defenses of Los Angeles and San Diego, California, and the Columbia River
  - 4th Coast Artillery (HD) - Harbor Defenses of Balboa, Panama
  - 5th Coast Artillery (HD) - Harbor Defenses of Southern New York
  - 6th Coast Artillery (HD) - Harbor Defenses of San Francisco, California
  - 7th Coast Artillery (HD) - Harbor Defenses of Sandy Hook, New Jersey, and the Delaware River
  - 8th Coast Artillery (HD) - Harbor Defenses of Portland, Maine, and Portsmouth, New Hampshire
  - 9th Coast Artillery (HD) - Harbor Defenses of Boston, Massachusetts
  - 10th Coast Artillery (HD) - Harbor Defenses of Narragansett Bay, Rhode Island and New Bedford, Massachusetts
  - 11th Coast Artillery (HD) - Harbor Defenses of Long Island Sound, New York
  - 12th Coast Artillery (HD) - Harbor Defenses of the Potomac River and Chesapeake Bay
  - 13th Coast Artillery (HD) - Harbor Defenses of Pensacola and Key West, Florida, and Charleston, South Carolina
  - 14th Coast Artillery (HD) - Harbor Defenses of Puget Sound, Washington
  - 15th Coast Artillery (HD) - Harbor Defenses of Pearl Harbor, Hawaii
  - 16th Coast Artillery (HD) - Harbor Defenses of Honolulu, Hawaii
- 3 tractor drawn regiments (155 mm)
  - 51st Coast Artillery (TD)
  - 55th Coast Artillery (TD)
  - 59th Coast Artillery (TD)
- 3 railway regiments
  - 41st Coast Artillery (RY)
  - 52nd Coast Artillery (RY)
  - 53rd Coast Artillery (RY) (active with Organized Reserve personnel as a "Regular Army Inactive" unit 1927–1930)
- 6 anti-aircraft regiments
  - 60th Coast Artillery (AA)
  - 61st Coast Artillery (AA)
  - 62nd Coast Artillery (AA)
  - 63rd Coast Artillery (AA)
  - 64th Coast Artillery (AA)
  - 65th Coast Artillery (AA)
- 2 Philippine Scouts (PS) regiments
  - 91st Coast Artillery (HD) (PS)
  - 92nd Coast Artillery (TD) (PS)

=== National Guard ===
- 10 harbor defense regiments (units designated as battalions or batteries as of 1924 are not listed)
  - 240th Coast Artillery (Maine) - Harbor Defenses of Portland, Maine
  - 241st Coast Artillery (Massachusetts) - Harbor Defenses of Boston, Massachusetts
  - 242nd Coast Artillery (Connecticut) - Harbor Defenses of Long Island Sound
  - 243rd Coast Artillery (Rhode Island) - Harbor Defenses of Narragansett Bay, Rhode Island
  - 245th Coast Artillery (New York) - Harbor Defenses of Southern New York
  - 246th Coast Artillery (Virginia) - Harbor Defenses of the Chesapeake Bay
  - 249th Coast Artillery (Oregon) - Harbor Defenses of the Columbia River
  - 251st Coast Artillery (California) - Harbor Defenses of San Diego and Los Angeles, California
  - 260th Coast Artillery (District of Columbia) - Harbor Defenses of the Potomac River
  - 264th Coast Artillery (Georgia) - Harbor Defenses of Savannah, Georgia
- 2 tractor drawn regiments (155 mm)
  - 244th Coast Artillery (TD) (New York)
  - 250th Coast Artillery (TD) (California)
- 9 anti-aircraft regiments
  - 197th Coast Artillery (AA) (New Hampshire)
  - 198th Coast Artillery (AA) (Delaware National Guard)
  - 200th Coast Artillery (AA) (North Carolina)
  - 202nd Coast Artillery (AA) (Illinois)
  - 203rd Coast Artillery (AA) (Missouri)
  - 206th Coast Artillery (AA) (Arkansas)
  - 211th Coast Artillery (AA) (Massachusetts)
  - 212th Coast Artillery (AA) (New York)
  - 213th Coast Artillery (AA) (Pennsylvania)

=== Interwar and World War II reorganization ===
- 1926: Battery G (NC) of the 200th CA Regiment (AA), AL, FL, LA, MS, and NC National Guard, which was the only active element of the regiment, was redesignated Battery F, 252nd CA Battalion (HD), on 1 December 1926.
- 1927: the 200th CA Regiment (AA) was demobilized (disbanded) on 5 September 1927.
- 1929: the 252nd CA Battalion (HD) reorganized as the 252nd CA Regiment (TD) in the NC National Guard, the 260th CA Regiment (HD) reorganized as the 260th CA (AA) in the DC National Guard, and the 265th CA Battalion (HD) reorganized as the 265th CA Regiment (HD) in the FL National Guard.
- 1930: the 251st CA (HD) reorganized as the 251st Coast Artillery Regiment (AA) in the CA National Guard, and the 263rd CA Battalion (HD) reorganized as the 263rd CA Regiment (HD) in the SC National Guard. The 59th Coast Artillery (TD) was reorganized as HD in the Philippines, and the 53rd CA (RY) was demobilized.
- 1931: the 41st CA Regiment (RY) was inactivated in Hawaii.
- 1932: the 2nd CA Regiment (HD) was transferred to Fort Monroe in the Harbor Defenses of Chesapeake Bay and the 12th CA Regiment (HD) was inactivated.
- 1933: the 264th CA Regiment (HD) reorganized as the 214th CA Regiment (AA) in the GA National Guard.
- 1935: the 248th CA Battalion (HD) was expanded to the 248th CA Regiment (HD) in the WA National Guard.
- 1940: the 207th CA Regiment (AA) of the NM National Guard, converted from the 111th Cavalry Regiment on 26 April 1940, was redesignated the 200th CA Regiment (AA) on 1 July 1940.

Mobilization in 1939-41 created more regiments, some newly-constituted and others by the conversion of unneeded units from other arms such as infantry and cavalry, particularly in the National Guard. The National Guard units above were placed on active duty during this period.

- (7) Harbor Defense regiments
  - 18th Coast Artillery, Columbia River and San Francisco
  - 19th Coast Artillery, San Diego (redesignated from 625th CA (HD))
  - 20th Coast Artillery, Galveston, TX
  - 21st Coast Artillery, Delaware River
  - 22nd Coast Artillery, Portsmouth, NH (redesignated from 614th CA (HD))
  - 23rd Coast Artillery, New Bedford, MA (redesignated from 616th CA (HD))
  - 261st Coast Artillery Battalion, Delaware River, Delaware National Guard
- (2) Tractor Drawn regiments (155mm)
  - 54th Coast Artillery (Colored) (redesignated from inactive 44th CA (TD))
  - 253rd Coast Artillery (Puerto Rico National Guard)
- (27) Anti-aircraft regiments
- On 20 July 1940 the 261st Coast Artillery (HD) Battalion was notionally expanded to a regiment, with a 2nd battalion constituted in the New Jersey National Guard (the 1st battalion was Delaware National Guard). However, the 2nd battalion, activated in 1940, was redesignated as the 122nd CA (AA) Battalion in January 1941. The 1st battalion was redesignated as the 261st CA (HD) Battalion (Separate) shortly before activation in January 1941.

Accelerated mobilization following the attack on Pearl Harbor and the American entry into World War II created the following regiments:

- (5) Harbor Defense regiments
  - 24th Coast Artillery, Newfoundland
  - 27th Coast Artillery Battalion, Bermuda
  - 31st Coast Artillery, Key West, FL
  - 35th Coast Artillery, Puerto Rico
  - 36th Coast Artillery, Puerto Rico, St. Thomas, later Panama
- (1) Railway regiment
  - 41st Coast Artillery (RY), Hawaii (partial activation; redesignated as HD for the North Shore in May 1943)
- (7) Tractor Drawn regiments (155mm)
  - 30th Coast Artillery, Aleutian Islands
  - 40th Coast Artillery, Aleutian Islands
  - 46th Coast Artillery
  - 47th Coast Artillery
  - 50th Coast Artillery
  - 53rd Coast Artillery
  - 58th Coast Artillery, South America, Dutch West Indies
- (26) Anti-aircraft regiments

In World War II more expansion and reorganization occurred. The Japanese invasion of the Philippines resulted in the surrender of US forces there on 9 April and 6 May 1942, including the 59th CA (HD), 60th CA (AA), 200th CA (AA), 515th CA (AA), 91st CA (HD) (PS), and 92nd CA (TD) (PS). The anti-aircraft regiments were broken up into battalions in 1943-44 and the harbor defense regiments were similarly broken up in late 1944, as part of an Army-wide reorganization that left only the Infantry branch as regiments. The "coast artillery" nomenclature was dropped from the antiaircraft units' designations at this time. As a result of this reorganization (in most cases), 46 anti-aircraft artillery (AAA) brigades, 155 AAA groups, and 13 coast artillery groups were activated, probably controlling task-organized groups of battalions. Over 900 battalions were created with the following designations:

- Coast Artillery Battalion
- Antiaircraft Artillery Battalion
- Antiaircraft Artillery Automatic Weapons Battalion
- Antiaircraft Artillery Gun Battalion
- Antiaircraft Artillery Searchlight Battalion
- Barrage Balloon Battalion.

On 1 April 1945 the majority of the remaining coast artillery battalions (other than antiaircraft) were inactivated, with most personnel either transferred to their parent harbor defense commands or used to activate or fill out field artillery units.

== Coast Artillery School ==
=== Distinctive unit insignia ===
- Description- A Gold color metal and enamel device 1 inch (2.54 cm) in height overall consisting of a shield blazoned: Per fess wavy Gules and Azure in chief on an oval escutcheon of the first (Gules) in front of the cannon saltirewise Or an Artillery projectile paleways within a bordure of the last (Or) in base a submarine mine of the like (Or).
- Background- The distinctive unit insignia was approved on 16 October 1929.
- Device
- Blazon
- Shield- Per fess wavy Gules and Azure in chief on an oval escutcheon of the first (Gules) in front of the cannon saltirewise Or an Artillery projectile paleways within a bordure of the last (Or) in base a submarine mine of the like (Or).
- Supporters- Two cannons paleways Or.
- Motto: "Defendimus" (We Defend).
- Symbolism
- Shield

The design was used by the Coast Artillery School for many years but was never recorded by the War Department. It is a shield of red and blue parted horizontally by a wavy line; on the upper red portion of the shield is the insignia of the Coast Artillery, and on the lower blue portion a submarine mine in gold. A scroll bearing the words "Coast Artillery School" may be added to the device.

- Supporters- Two cannons, muzzles up, are used as supporters.
- Background- The device was approved on 8 November 1924.

== See also ==
- Harbor Defense Command
- Seacoast defense in the United States
- List of coastal fortifications of the United States
- List of United States War Department Forms - Lists US Army ordnance publications circa 1895–1920, links online versions, including many coast artillery weapons
- Coastal defence and fortification
- United States home front during World War I
- Attacks on North America during World War II
- Harbor Defense Museum at Fort Hamilton, Brooklyn, NY

== Sources ==
- Berhow, Mark A., ed. (2015). American Seacoast Defenses, A Reference Guide (Third ed.). CDSG Press. ISBN 978-0-9748167-3-9.
- Conn, Stetson; Engelman, Rose C.; Fairchild, Byron (2000). Guarding the United States and Its Outposts. United States Army Center of Military History. ISBN 978-14102019-2-8.
- Friedman, Norman (1985). U.S. Battleships: An Illustrated Design History. Annapolis, Maryland: United States Naval Institute. ISBN 978-0-87021-715-9.
- Lewis, Emanuel Raymond (1979). Seacoast Fortifications of the United States. Annapolis: Leeward Publications. ISBN 978-0-929521-11-4.
- Miller, H. W., LTC, USA (1921). Railway Artillery, Vols. I and II. Washington: US Government Printing Office.
- Ordnance Corps, US Army (1922). American Coast Artillery Materiel. Washington: Government Printing Office.
- Rinaldi, Richard A. (2004). The U. S. Army in World War I: Orders of Battle. General Data LLC. ISBN 0-9720296-4-8.
- Stanton, Shelby L. (1991). World War II Order of Battle. Galahad Books. ISBN 0-88365-775-9.
- Williford, Glen (2016). American Breechloading Mobile Artillery, 1875-1953. Atglen, PA: Schiffer Publishing, Ltd. ISBN 978-0-7643-5049-8.
- List of all US coastal forts and batteries at the Coastal Defense Study Group, Inc. website
- FortWiki, lists most CONUS and Canadian forts
