= Sunset Beach =

Sunset Beach may refer to:

== Beaches ==
=== Canada ===
- Sunset Beach (Vancouver), in Vancouver, British Columbia, Canada

=== United States ===
- Sunset Beach, California (Orange County)
- Sunset Beach in Pacific Grove, California
- Sunset Beach (Treasure Island), Florida
- Sunset Beach (New Jersey), in Cape May, New Jersey
- Sunset Beach (Oahu), in Pupukea, Oahu, Hawaii
- Sunset Beach State Recreation Site, in Oregon
- Sunset Beach, North Carolina
- Sunset Beach, West Virginia

== Settlements ==
=== Australia ===
- Sunset Beach, Western Australia

=== Canada ===
- Sunset Beach, Alberta
- Sunset Beach, Ontario (disambiguation), one of four communities in Ontario, Canada
- Sunset Beach, Saskatchewan

=== United States ===
- Sunset Beach, California
- Sunset Beach, Oregon
- Sunset Beach, New Jersey
- Sunset Beach, New York
- Sunset Beach, North Carolina
- Sunset Beach, Washington
- Sunset Beach, Wisconsin

== Other ==
- Sunset Beach (TV series), an American television soap opera from 1997 to 1999
- Sunset Beach Hotel

== See also ==
- Sunset Beach, Alberta (disambiguation)
- Sunset State Beach, near Watsonville, California
- Sunset (disambiguation)
