= 6-inch gun M1897 =

American coastal artillery field gun

6-inch gun M1900
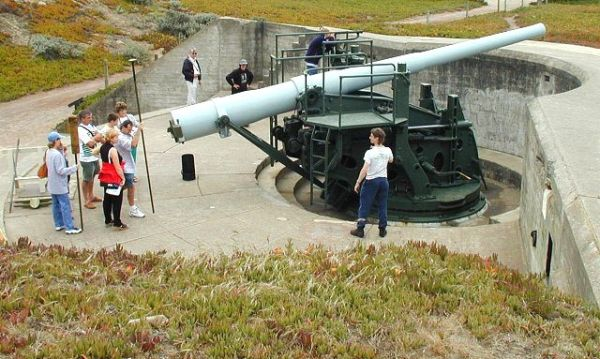
- 6-inch gun M1905 on disappearing carriage M1903, Battery Chamberlin, Fort Winfield Scott, Presidio of San Francisco
- Type: coastal artillery; field gun
- Place of origin: United States

Service history
- In service: 1897–1945
- Used by: United States Army
- Wars: World War I, World War II

Production history
- Designer: Watervliet Arsenal
- Designed: 1897
- Manufacturer: Watervliet Arsenal, possibly others
- Variants: M1897, M1900, M1903, M1905, M1908, M1 (a.k.a. T2)

Specifications
- Mass: 19,114 pounds (8,670 kg)
- Length: 310.4 inches (788 cm)
- Barrel length: 50 calibers (300 inches (760 cm)); M1897 & M1908: 45 calibers (270 inches (690 cm))
- Shell: separate loading, 108 pounds (49 kg) or 105 pounds (48 kg) AP shot & shell, 90 pounds (41 kg) HE
- Caliber: 6 inch (152 mm)
- Breech: Interrupted screw, De Bange type
- Recoil: Hydro-spring
- Carriage: M1898, M1903, or M1905 disappearing; M1900 or M1910 pedestal; M1, M2, M3, M4 shielded barbette; most carriages manufactured by Watertown Arsenal
- Elevation: disappearing: 15°; pedestal: 20°; WWII high-angle barbette: 47°
- Traverse: disappearing: 170° (varied with emplacement); pedestal: 360° (varied with emplacement); WWII high-angle barbette: 360° (varied with emplacement)
- Maximum firing range: disappearing: 14,600 yards (13,400 m); pedestal: 17,000 yards (16,000 m); WWII high-angle barbette with M1 gun: 27,500 yards (25,100 m)
- Feed system: hand

The 6-inch gun M1897 (152 mm) and its variants the M1900, M1903, M1905, M1908, and M1 (a.k.a. T2) were coastal artillery pieces installed to defend major American seaports between 1897 and 1945. For most of their history, they were operated by the United States Army Coast Artillery Corps. They were installed on disappearing carriages or pedestal (a.k.a. barbette) mountings, and during World War II many were remounted on shielded barbette carriages. Most of the weapons not in the Philippines were scrapped within a few years after World War II.

== History ==
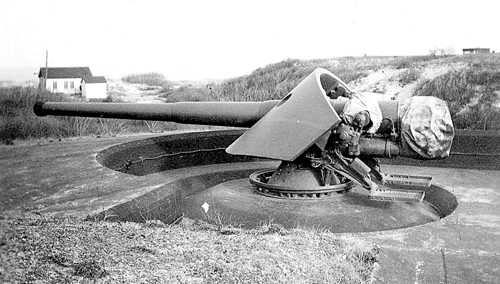
6-inch M1900 gun on M1900 pedestal mount, similar to two weapons still present at Fort Hancock, New Jersey

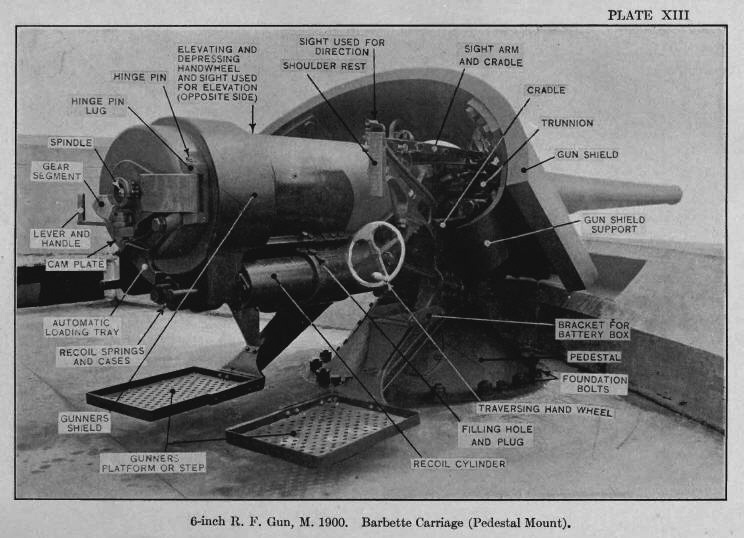
6-inch M1900 gun on M1900 pedestal mount, annotated

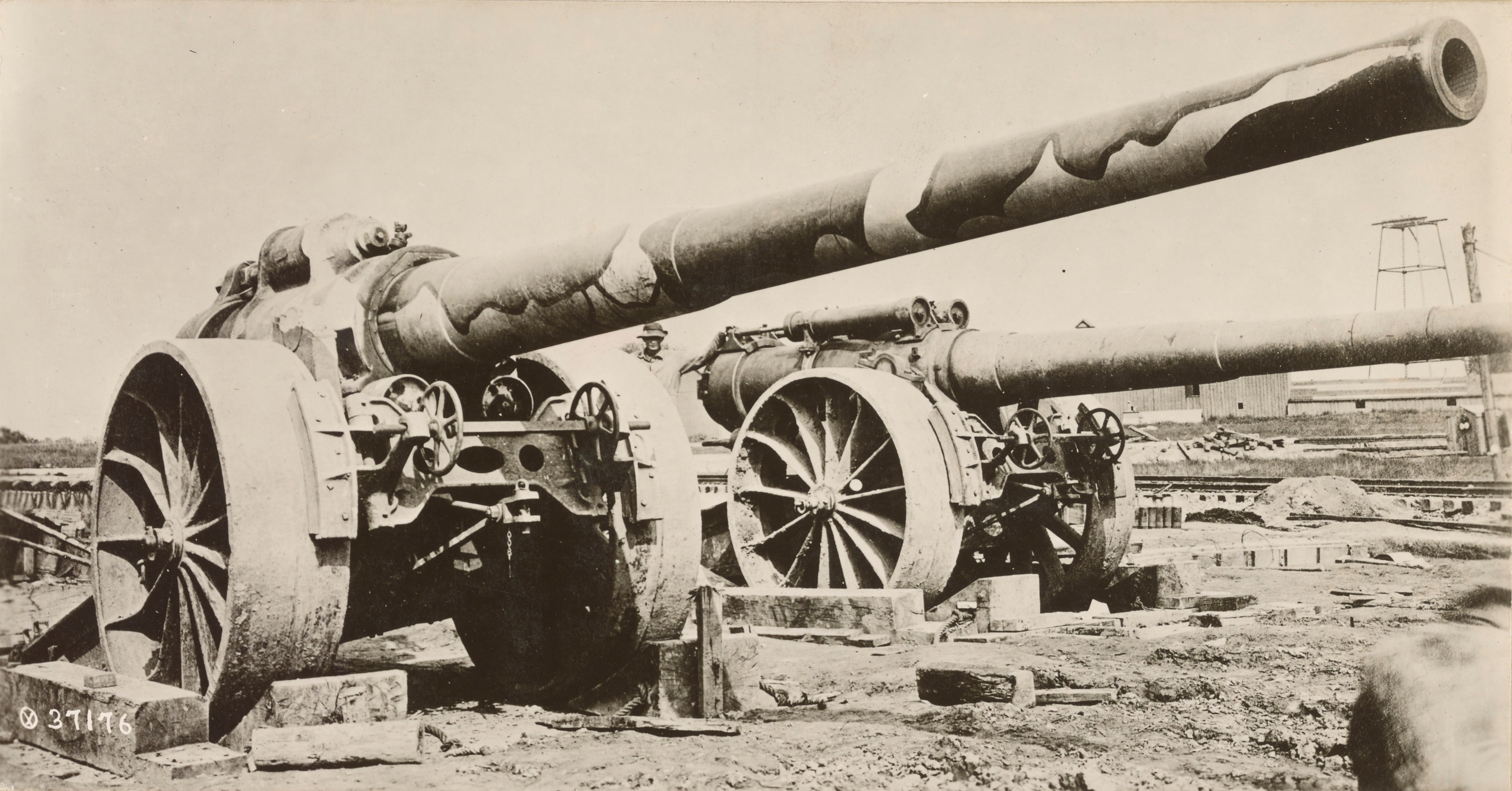
Two 6-inch guns on an M1917 carriage (foreground) and an M1917A carriage (background) in early 1919.

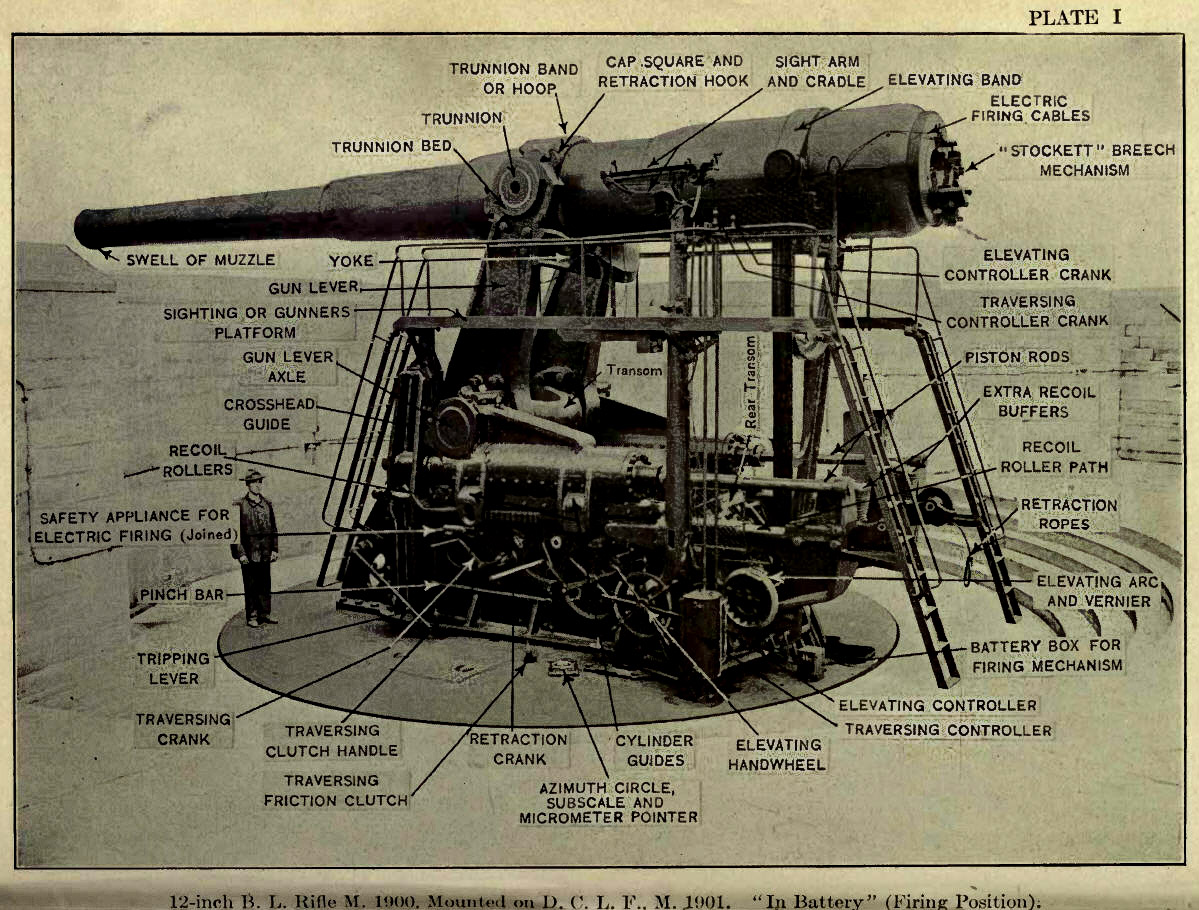
Annotated photograph of an M1901 Buffington–Crozier disappearing carriage for an M1900 12-inch gun, generally similar to 6-inch disappearing carriages

In 1885, William C. Endicott, President Grover Cleveland's Secretary of War, was tasked with creating the Board of Fortifications to review seacoast defenses. The board's findings in its 1886 report painted a grim picture of existing defenses. They recommended a massive $127 million construction program for breech-loading cannons, mortars, floating batteries, and submarine mines at some 29 locations along the US coastline. Most of the board's recommendations were implemented. United States Army Coast Artillery Corps fortifications built between 1885 and 1905 are often referred to as Endicott Period fortifications.

The 6-inch caliber was chosen, as in many applications, for combining a relatively heavy shell with rapid hand loading. In the overall system, it was an intermediate caliber between the heavy 8-inch, 10-inch, and 12-inch weapons and the small 3-inch guns intended to defend minefields against minesweepers.

The Watervliet Arsenal designed the guns and built the barrels. Initially, most of the guns were mounted on disappearing carriages; when the gun was fired, it dropped behind a concrete and/or earthen wall for protection from counter-battery fire. Within a few years, it was realized that operating the disappearing carriage negatively impacted the rate of fire, and the M1900 low-profile pedestal mount was designed.

On the outbreak of the Spanish–American War in 1898, most of the Endicott fortifications were still under construction. To quickly arm some works, a few weapons were purchased from the United Kingdom, including nine 6-inch Armstrong guns, two of which survive at Fort DeSoto near St. Petersburg, Florida. These appear to have been withdrawn from service by 1925.

Between the Endicott program and the 1905–15 Taft Board fortifications, approximately 200 6-inch guns were emplaced in the United States and its possessions, around 150 of which were on disappearing carriages.

=== World War I ===
After the American entry into World War I, the Army recognized the need for large-caliber guns for use on the Western Front. The Coast Artillery operated all US Army heavy artillery in that war, due to their experience and training with these weapons. A total of 95 6-inch coast defense guns were removed from fixed emplacements or drawn from spares and mounted on M1917 wheeled carriages as field guns; most of these (72, plus possibly a few ex-Navy weapons) equipped three Coast Artillery regiments in France, the 61st, 62nd, and 68th.

The guns were nicknamed "6-inch Terrors". However, due to the Armistice, none of these regiments completed training in time to see action. By 1917, pedestal mounts for 6-inch guns (all of them M1900 weapons) were known to be superior to disappearing mounts, enabling more rapid target tracking and a higher rate of fire. Thus, most disappearing guns (except the M1897, shorter than the others) were dismounted for use as field guns, while most of the few pedestal guns dismounted were returned to the forts soon after the war.

The removed 6-inch disappearing guns (primarily M1903 and M1905) were stored, and many were returned to service in World War II. The Army weapons removed included up to 18 M1900 guns and 74 M1903 and M1905 guns based on carriages ordered (M1917A carriages for the M1900 weapons, M1917 carriages for the M1903/M1905 weapons). One source states that four M1900 guns and 68 M1903/M1905 guns arrived in France.

An additional 46 6-inch guns of other types were provided by the Navy and 30 ex-Navy guns from arms dealer Francis Bannerman; a few of these were possibly delivered to France before the Armistice. These included Navy guns Marks 2 through 6, of 30-, 40-, 45-, and 50-caliber lengths. All of the Bannerman guns were 30 caliber long; the number of guns of other lengths is unclear. Sources state that all Navy guns were cut down to 30 calibers barrel length in an attempt to standardize ballistics, as that was the length of the shortest Navy guns. Thirty-seven M1917B carriages were ordered for the Navy guns, with a view to having a spare tube for each carriage; it is unclear how many were produced, or if any were delivered to France.

Some of the Army weapons (primarily the M1900 guns due to their fast-operating pedestal mounts) were returned to coast defenses after the war, but most (a count of disarmed batteries shows approximately 81) were stored until World War II. One survives on a field carriage in the collection of the U.S. Army Ordnance Training and Heritage Center, Fort Gregg-Adams, Virginia. In June 1919, after the Treaty of Versailles was signed, the field carriages for the 6-inch guns were declared obsolete and almost entirely scrapped.

=== World War II ===
6-inch gun M1905 on shielded barbette carriage at Fort Columbia State Park, Washington state

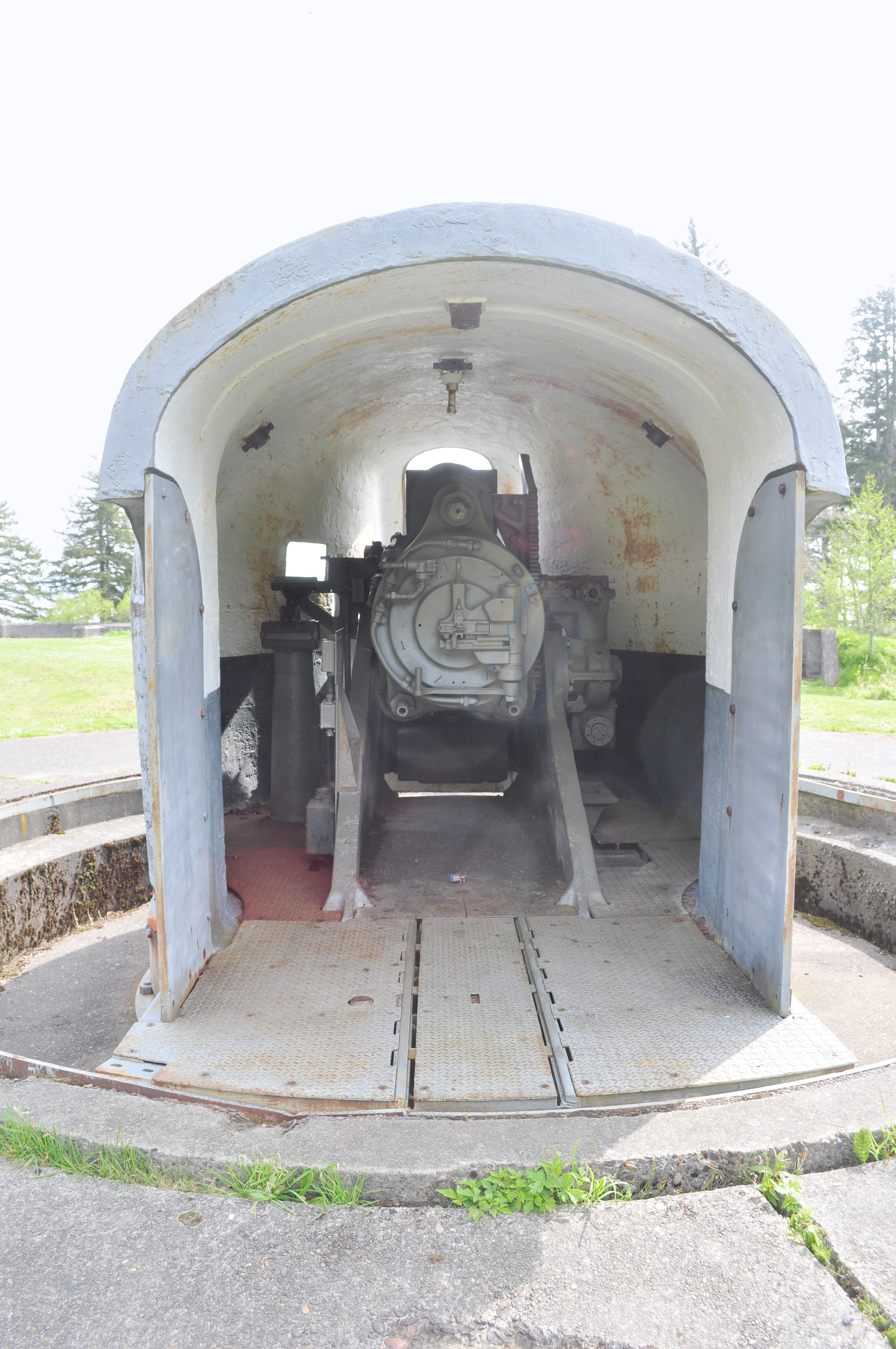
Rear view of shielded barbette carriage

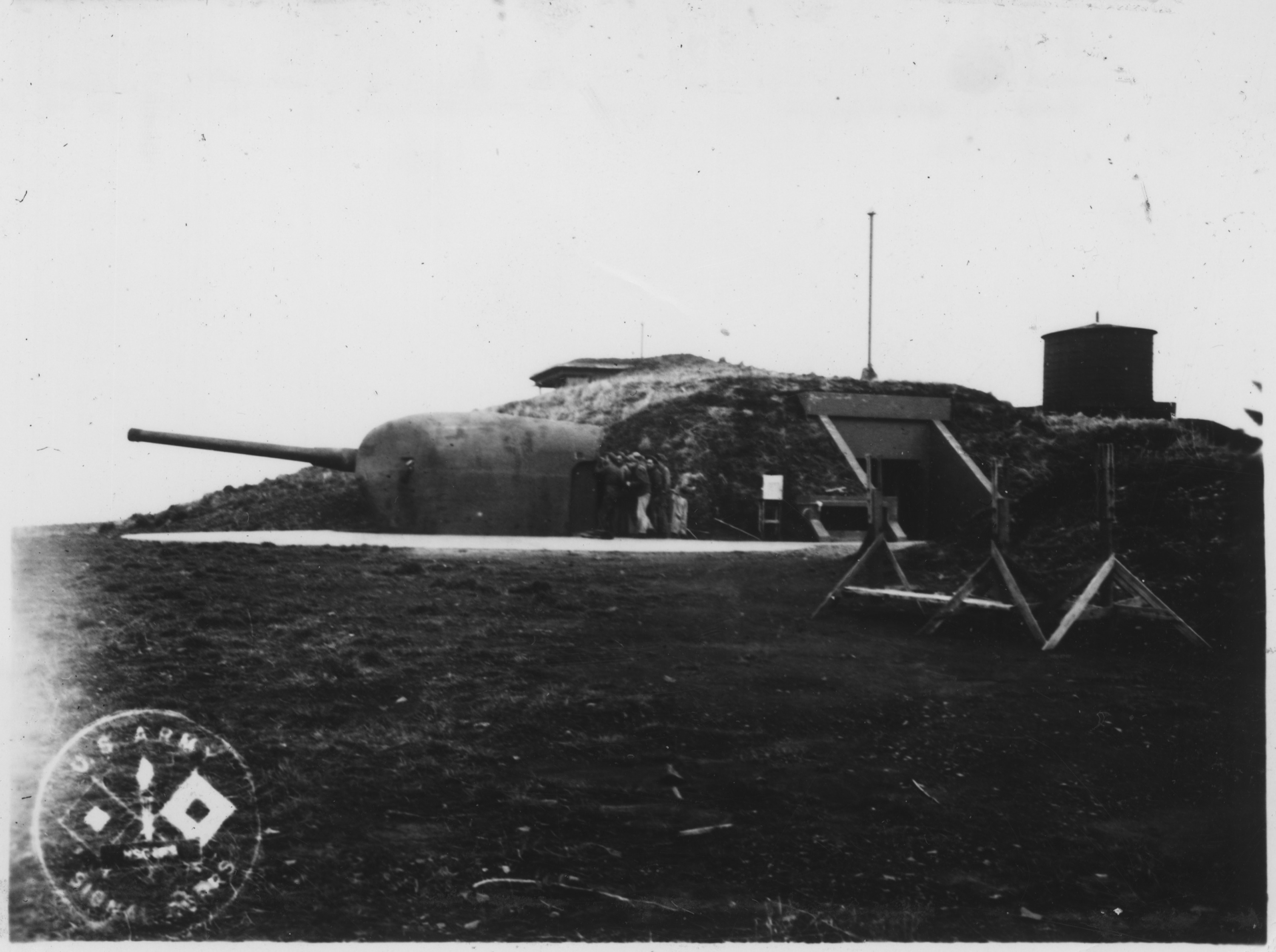
Battery 245 at Fort Stevens, Oregon, two 6-inch guns on shielded barbette carriages, built in World War II. The battery's ammunition and fire control bunker is behind the gun.

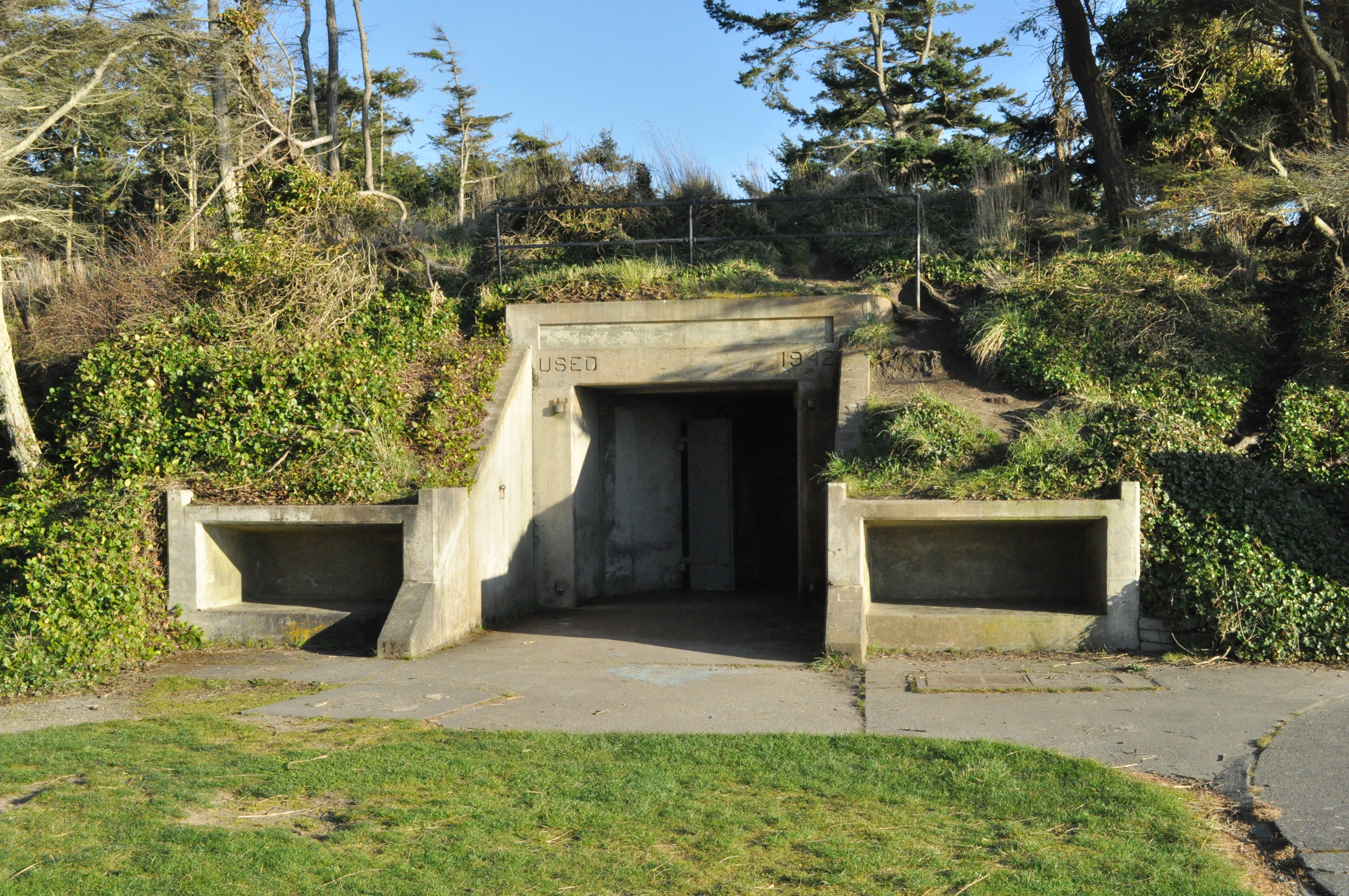
Typical entrance to 6-inch ammunition bunker at Fort Ebey, Washington state

Along with other coast artillery weapons, some of the 6-inch guns in the Philippines saw action during the Japanese invasion of the Philippines in World War II. Since they were positioned against a naval attack, they were poorly sited to engage the Japanese, and the open mountings were vulnerable to air and high-angle artillery attack.

In 1940–44, 16-inch gun batteries were constructed at most harbor defenses to replace the aging Endicott- and Taft-era weapons. Many 6-inch weapons (most of them stored since World War I) were remounted on M1 through M4 shielded barbette carriages at new locations in two-gun batteries to complement the 16-inch guns. These allowed higher-angle fire than previous mountings, and extended the 6-inch guns' range from 17,000 yards (16,000 m) to 27,000 yards (25,000 m). The M1903 and M1905 weapons were remounted as the M1903A2 and M1905A2, and a new M1 gun (initially designated the T2) was armed on some batteries. A heavily concreted magazine structure with a gas-tight plotting room was constructed between each pair of guns.

At one point, 87 batteries were proposed, but only about 65 were built and 45 armed before construction was suspended late in World War II. Approximately 140 barbette carriages were constructed. Some additional 6"/50 caliber ex-Navy guns were mounted in the year after Pearl Harbor to provide some defense while the new batteries were under construction; locations included Alaska, American Samoa, and Suriname (formerly Dutch Guiana), among others.

Some of the M1900 weapons on pedestal mounts were retained in service or relocated to better positions during the war, but the disappearing guns were mostly scrapped by 1944. Following World War II, the entire coast defense system, including almost all of the 6-inch guns, was scrapped.

== Specifications ==
Gun lengths are muzzle to breech face.

Model	Length in calibers	Gun Length	Weight
M1897	44.58	277.85 in (705.74 cm)	16,216 lb (7,355 kg)
M1900	50	310.40 in (788.42 cm)	19,968 lb (9,057 kg)
M1903	50	310.40 in (788.42 cm)	19,990 lb (9,067 kg)
M1905	50	310.40 in (788.42 cm)	21,148 lb (9,593 kg)
M1908	44.58	277.85 in (705.74 cm)	12,500 lb (5,670 kg)
M1 (T2)	50	Approx. 300 in (762.00 cm)	20,550 lb (9,321 kg)

== Carriages ==
The carriages for Army 6-inch guns were:

Carriage	Type	Usual gun(s)	Number built
M1898	disappearing	M1897	29
M1900	pedestal	M1900	45
M1903	disappearing	M1903, M1905, M1900	90
M1905	disappearing	M1905, M1908	33
M1910	pedestal	M1908M2	6
M1917	field gun	M1903, M1905	74
M1917A	field gun	M1900	18
M1, M2, M3, M4	shielded high-angle barbette	M1903A2, M1905A2, M1 (T2)	143 (approx)

== Surviving examples ==
At least 20 Army 6-inch guns remain, mostly in the Philippines.

- One 6-inch Gun M1905 (#30 Watervliet) on Disappearing Carriage M1903 (#1 Watertown), Battery Cooper, Fort Pickens, Pensacola, Florida (weapon formerly at Battery Schofield, West Point, New York, and before that at Battery Livingston, Fort Hamilton, Brooklyn, New York).
- One 6-inch Gun M1905 (#9 Watervliet) on Disappearing Carriage M1903 (#2 Watertown), Battery Chamberlin, Fort Winfield Scott, Presidio of San Francisco, California (weapon formerly at Battery Schofield, West Point, New York, and before that at Battery Livingston, Fort Hamilton, Brooklyn, New York).
- Two 6-inch Guns M1905 (#31 & #32 Watervliet) on Disappearing Carriages M1905MI (#12 & #13 Watertown), Battery Morrison, Fort Mills, Corregidor Island, Philippines.
- Two 6-inch Guns M1905 (#4 & #33 Watervliet) on Disappearing Carriages M1905MI (#9 & #11 Watertown), Battery Ramsay, Fort Mills, Corregidor Island, Philippines (guns severely cut up).
- One 6-inch Gun M1905 (#27 Watervliet) (spare gun), Battery Morrison, Fort Mills, Corregidor Island, Philippines (guns severely cut up).
- Two 6-inch Guns M1905 (#6 & #7 Watervliet) on Disappearing Carriages M1905MI (#6 & #7 Bethlehem), Battery Hall, Fort Wint, Grande Island, Subic Bay, Philippines.
- One 6-inch Gun M1908 (#6 Watervliet), Battery Leach, Fort Hughes, Caballo Island, Philippines.
- One 6-inch Gun M1908MII (#4 Watervliet), Battery Roberts, Fort Drum, El Fraile Island, Philippines (with shield only, no carriage).
- Two 6-inch Guns M1900 (#22 & #23 Watervliet) on Barbette Carriages M1900 (#12 & #17 Rock Island), Battery Peck, Fort Hancock, New Jersey (located in the emplacements of Battery Gunnison).
- Two 6-inch Guns M1905A2 (#16 & #21) on Barbette Carriages Model M1 (#58 & #59 Unk. mfr.), Battery 234, Fort Pickens, Pensacola, Florida (weapons formerly at Battery 227, Fort John Custis, Virginia).
- Two 6-inch Guns M1905A2 (#30 & #61) on Barbette Carriages Model M1 (#9 & #10 Unk. mfr.), Battery 246, Fort Columbia State Park, Chinook Point, Washington state (weapons formerly at Battery 281, Fort McAndrew, Argentia, Newfoundland).
- Two 6-inch Guns M1905A2 (#13 & #8) on Barbette Carriages Model M1 (#44 & #45 Unk. mfr.), Battery 282, Fort McAndrew, Argentia, Newfoundland.
- One 6-inch Gun M1905A1 (#12 Watervliet) with Limber (#82 Morgan Eng.) on Carriage M1917 (#22 Morgan Eng.), U.S. Army Ordnance Training and Heritage Center, Fort Gregg-Adams, VA.
- Two 6-inch Rapid Fire Armstrong Guns (#12139 and #12140) on Barbette Carriages Mk 2 (#11162 and #11157) (one with partial shield), Fort DeSoto, Mullet Key, near St. Petersburg, Florida (weapons formerly at Battery Burchsted, Fort Dade, Egmont Key, Florida).
- Several additional US Navy Mark VI and Mark VIII 6"/50 caliber guns survive in Alaska, American Samoa, and Suriname (formerly Dutch Guiana).

== See also ==
- Coastal artillery
- Seacoast defense in the United States
- Coast Artillery fire control system
- List of field guns
- List of U.S. Army weapons by supply catalog designation
- United States War Department Forms - index of US Army ordnance manuals circa 1900–1920

=== Weapons of comparable role, performance, and era ===
- 6"/50 caliber gun - contemporary US Navy weapon, used on ships circa 1900 and as coast defense in World War II
- BL 6-inch Mk VII naval gun - contemporary British weapon, used on ships, as coast defense, and as field artillery
- 6-inch gun M1917 - British 6-inch gun Mark XIX, acquired as field artillery by the US in the World War I era; all US weapons transferred to Brazil as coast artillery 1940–41

== Bibliography ==
- Instructions for Mounting, Using, and Caring for Disappearing Carriage L. F., Model of 1905MII, and 6-inch Guns Models of 1905 and 1908, January 14, 1914. Washington: Government Printing Office
- Lohrer, George L. (1904). Ordnance Supply Manual, United States Army Ordnance Dept. Washington, DC: Government Printing Office. pp. 235–258.
- TM 9-424, 6-inch Seacoast Materiel: Gun M1900 mounted on Barbette Carriage M1900
- TM 9-428, 6-inch Seacoast Materiel: Guns M1903A2 and M1905A2; Barbette Carriage M1
