= 3rd Air Defense Artillery Regiment =

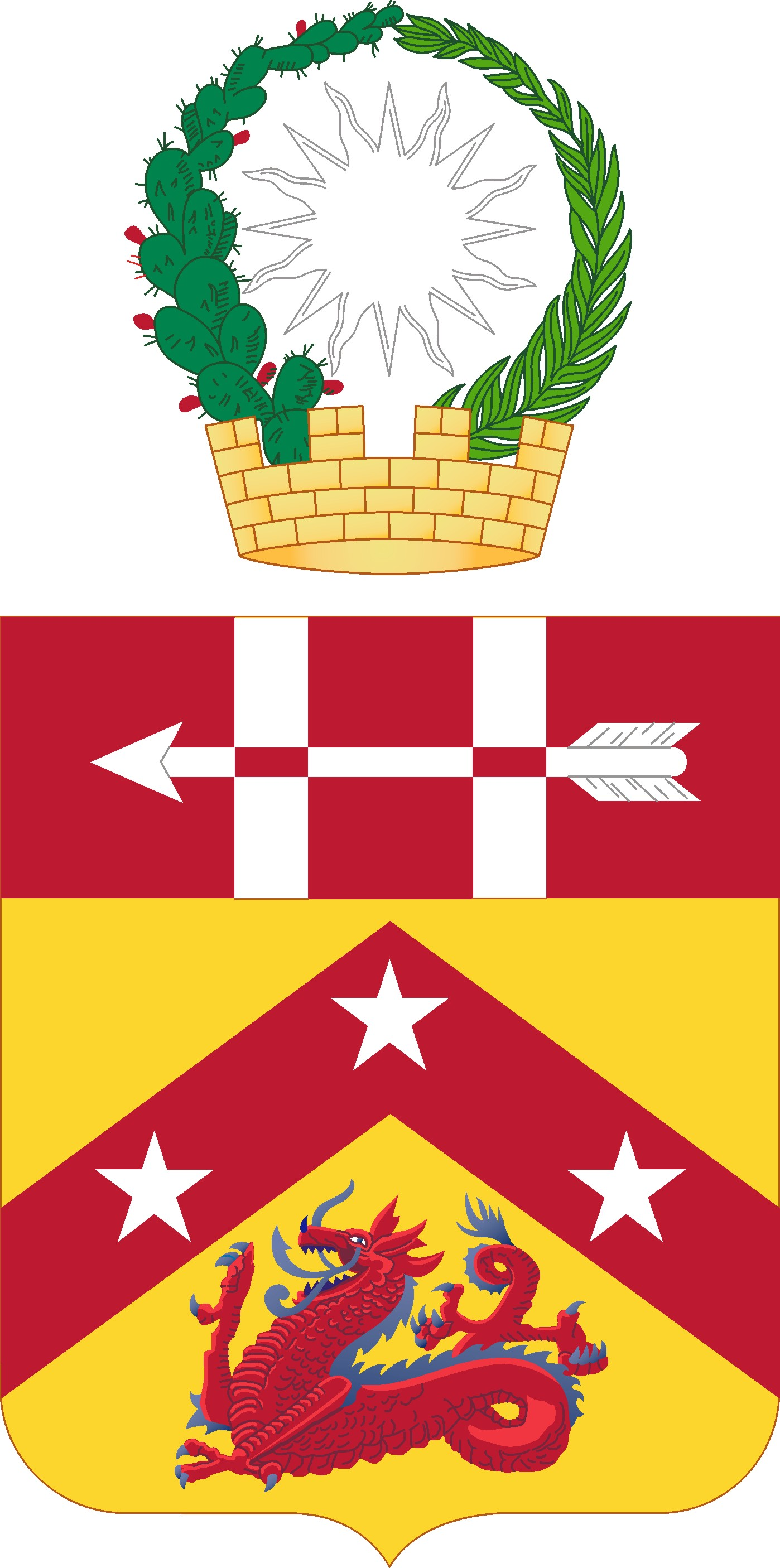
- Active: 1821
- Country: United States
- Branch: United States Army
- Type: Air defense artillery
- Mottos: NON CEDO FERIO (yield not, strike).
- Engagements: War of 1812; Indian Wars; Mexican War; American Civil War; Spanish–American War; World War II; Korean War; Southwest Asia
- Decorations: Meritorious Unit Commendation

Commanders
- Notable commanders: George Henry Thomas; Braxton Bragg; Walker Keith Armistead; Robert Anderson; Romeyn B. Ayres

Insignia
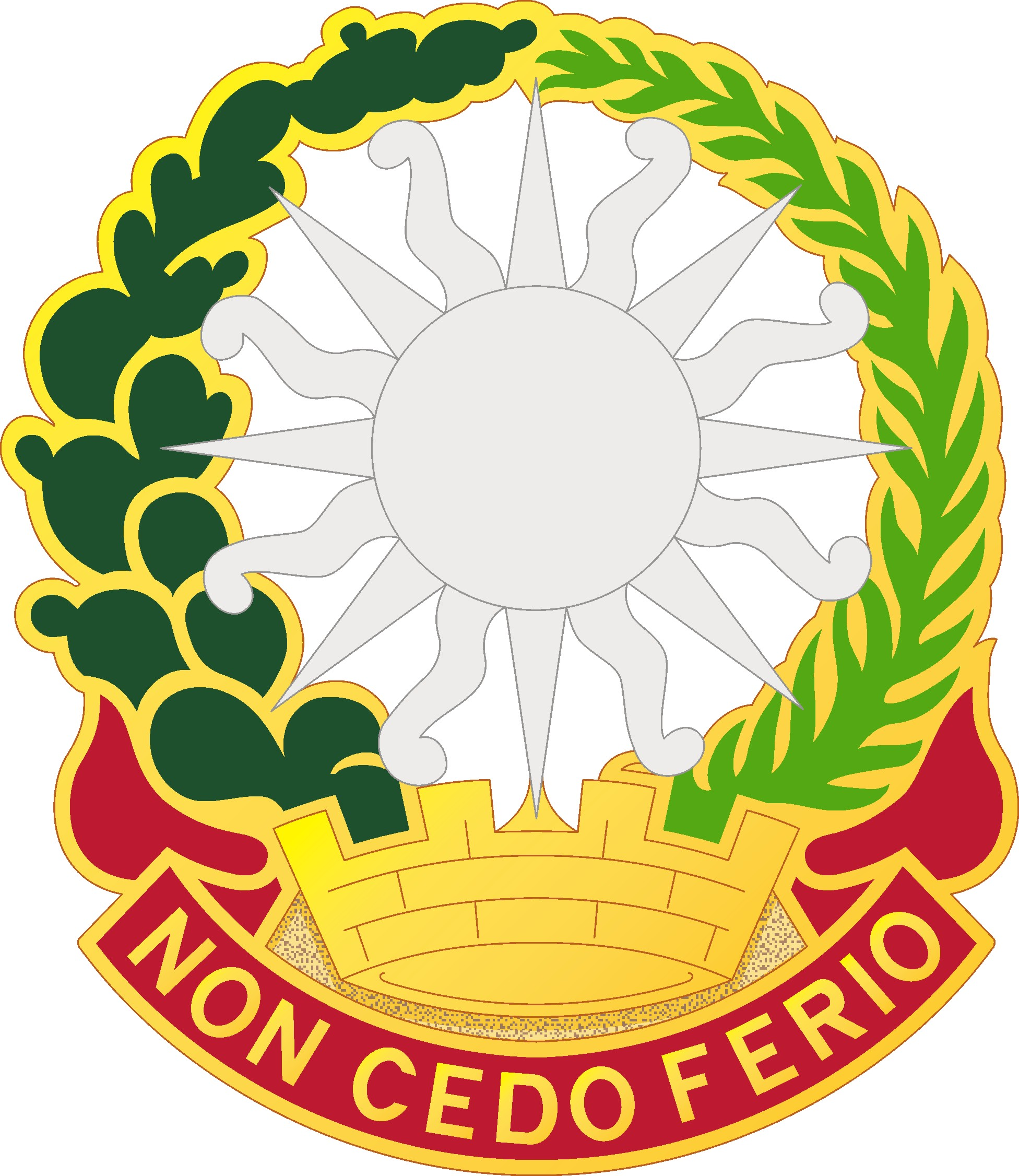
- Distinctive unit insignia

The 3rd Air Defense Artillery Regiment is an air defense artillery regiment of the United States Army, first formed in 1821 as the 3rd Regiment of Artillery.

== History ==
Constituted 1 June 1821 in the Regular Army as the 3rd Regiment of Artillery and organized from existing units with headquarters at Fort Washington, Maryland. The lineages of some of the units that initially made up the 3rd U.S. Artillery include campaign credit for the War of 1812.

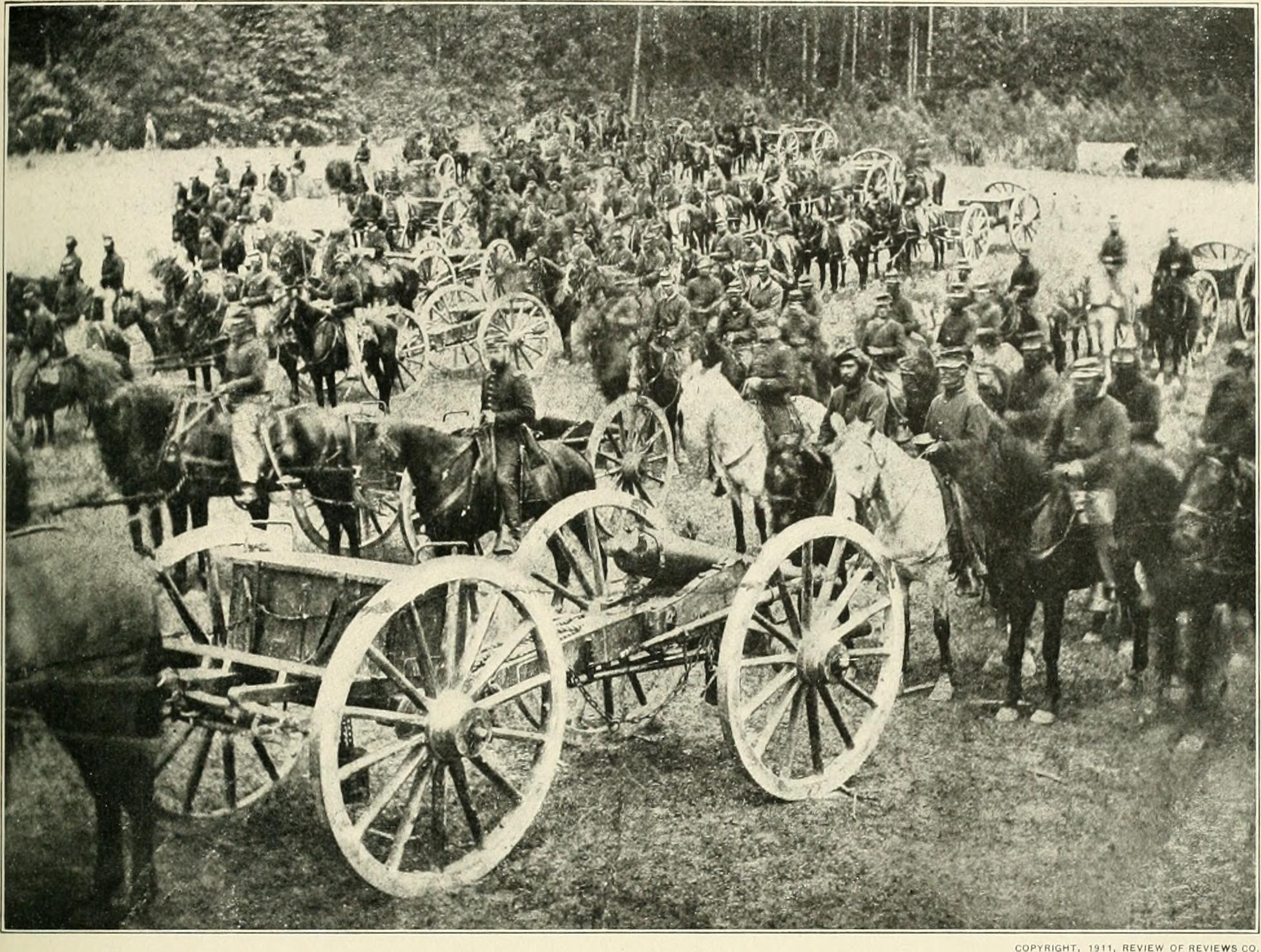
Battery A, 2nd U.S. Artillery and Batteries C&G (combined), 3rd U.S. Artillery near Fair Oaks, Virginia, June 1862. These were all horse artillery units at the time.

Twelve batteries of the 3rd U.S. Artillery served in the American Civil War.

Four batteries of the 3rd U.S. Artillery were assigned to Fort Jefferson, Florida in 1869.

The 1st and 2nd Battalions of the regiment deployed to the Philippines in the Spanish–American War of 1898, while Battery F deployed to Puerto Rico.

Regiment broken up 13 February 1901 and its elements reorganized and redesignated as separate numbered companies and batteries of the Artillery Corps.

Reconstituted 1 July 1924 in the Regular Army as the 3rd Coast Artillery (Harbor Defense) (Type B) and organized (less Batteries C, F, and G) with headquarters, 1st Battalion, and Batteries A & B at Fort MacArthur, California in the Harbor Defenses of Los Angeles. The regiment was organized by redesignating the 25th, 26th, 27th, 28th, 31st, 34th, 35th, and 36th companies of the Coast Artillery Corps (CAC). Batteries A, B, D, and E carried the lineage and designations of the corresponding batteries in the old 3rd Artillery. HHB 2nd Battalion and Battery D at Fort Rosecrans, California (HD San Diego) (Battery C inactive), and HHB 3rd Battalion and Battery E at Fort Stevens, Oregon (HD of the Columbia River) (Batteries F & G inactive).

The Oregon National Guard component of HD Columbia River was the 249th Coast Artillery from 1924 until October 1944, and the California National Guard component of HD Los Angeles and HD San Diego was the 251st Coast Artillery from 1924 until January 1930.

Batteries A and B inactivated 1 March 1930 at San Pedro and Fort MacArthur, California, respectively; Batteries A and F activated 1 July 1939 at Fort MacArthur and Fort Stevens, respectively; Battery D inactivated 1 February 1940 at Fort Rosecrans (replaced by Battery A, 19th Coast Artillery), with Batteries E & F inactivated at Fort Stevens (they became Batteries A & B, 18th Coast Artillery); Battery B activated 1 July 1940 at Fort MacArthur; Batteries C, D, E, and F activated 2 December 1940 at Fort MacArthur; Batteries B & D exchanged designations mid-December 1940; Battery G (searchlight battery) activated 1 June 1941 at Los Angeles, California; Battery G inactivated 29 August 1941 at Los Angeles; Battery G activated 14 February 1942 at Fort MacArthur; Batteries C & D exchanged designations 1 October 1942.

Regiment reorganized as Type A 21 August 1941.

Regiment broken up 18 October 1944 and its elements reorganized and redesignated as follows:

Headquarters and Headquarters Battery as Battery B, 521st Coast Artillery Battalion.

1st, 2nd, and 3rd Battalions as the 520th, 521st, and 522nd Coast Artillery Battalions, respectively.

After 18 October 1944 the above units underwent changes as follows:

520th CA Battalion redesignated as 3rd CA Battalion 1 December 1944.

3rd CA Battalion, 521st CA Battalion, and 522nd CA Battalion, disbanded 15 September 1945 at Fort MacArthur, California.

Reconstituted 28 June 1950 in the Regular Army and redesignated as Headquarters and Headquarters Battery, 3rd Antiaircraft Artillery Group. Activated 11 June 1951 at Camp Stewart, Georgia.

Redesignated 20 March 1958 as Headquarters and Headquarters Battery, 3rd Artillery Group. Inactivated 15 December 1961 at Norfolk, Virginia.

520th Coast Artillery Battalion redesignated 1 December 1944 as the 3rd Coast Artillery Battalion. Disbanded 15 September 1945 at Fort MacArthur, California. Reconstituted 20 January 1950 in the Regular Army; concurrently consolidated with the 3rd Antiaircraft Artillery Automatic Weapons Battalion (active) (see ANNEX 1) and consolidated unit designated as the 3rd Antiaircraft Artillery Automatic Weapons Battalion, an element of the 3rd Infantry Division. Redesignated 15 April 1953 as the 3rd Antiaircraft Artillery Battalion. Inactivated 1 July 1957 at Fort Benning, Georgia, and relieved from assignment to the 3rd Infantry Division.

521st Coast Artillery Battalion disbanded 15 September 1945 at Fort MacArthur, California. Reconstituted 28 June 1950 in the Regular Army and redesignated as the 18th Antiaircraft Artillery Battalion. Redesignated 13 March 1952 as the 18th Antiaircraft Artillery Gun Battalion Activated 2 May 1952 at Fort Custer, Michigan. Redesignated 24 July 1953 as the 18th Antiaircraft Artillery Battalion. Redesignated 15 June 1957 as the 18th Antiaircraft Artillery Missile Battalion. Inactivated 1 September 1958 at Detroit, Michigan.

522nd Coast Artillery Battalion disbanded 15 September 1945 at Huntington Beach (Bolsa Chica Military Reservation), California. Reconstituted 28 June 1950 in the Regular Army; concurrently consolidated with the 43rd Antiaircraft Artillery Automatic Weapons Battalion (active) (see ANNEX 2) and consolidated unit designated as the 43rd Antiaircraft Artillery Automatic Weapons Battalion, an element of the 10th Infantry Division. Redesignated 15 June 1954 as the 43rd Antiaircraft Artillery Battalion Relieved 16 May 1957 from assignment to the 10th Infantry Division. Inactivated 14 November 1957 in Germany.

Headquarters and Headquarters Battery, 3rd Artillery Group; 18th Antiaircraft Artillery Missile Battalion; 3rd and 43rd Antiaircraft Artillery Battalions; and the 3rd Armored Field Artillery Battalion (organized in 1907) consolidated, reorganized, and redesignated 15 December 1961 as the 3rd Artillery', a parent regiment under the Combat Arms Regimental System.

3rd Artillery (less former 3rd Armored Field Artillery Battalion) reorganized and redesignated 1 September 1971 as the 3rd Air Defense Artillery, a parent regiment under the Combat Arms Regimental System (former 3rd Armored Field Artillery Battalion concurrently reorganized and redesignated as the 3rd Field Artillery – hereafter separate lineage).

Withdrawn 16 July 1989 from the Combat Arms Regimental System and reorganized under the United States Army Regimental System.

=== ANNEX 1 (534th AAA-AW Bn, 3rd AAA-AW Bn) ===
Constituted 6 July 1942 in the Army of the United States as the 534th Coast Artillery Battalion (Antiaircraft) (Automatic Weapons).

Activated 15 July 1942 at Fort Bliss, Texas.

Departed New York port of embarkation 28 April 1943; arrived in North Africa 11 May 1943 and in Italy 9 September 1943.

Redesignated 12 December 1943 as the 534th Antiaircraft Artillery Automatic Weapons Battalion.

Has campaign credit for Anzio. Moved to France as part of Operation Dragoon 15 August 1944; has campaign credit for this and the Battle of the Bulge (Ardennes-Alsace). Returned to the US via the Hampton Roads port of embarkation 19 October 1945.

Inactivated 19 October 1945 at Camp Patrick Henry, Virginia.

Redesignated 9 December 1948 as the 3rd Antiaircraft Artillery Automatic Weapons Battalion and allotted to the Regular Army.

Activated 15 January 1949 at Fort Bliss, Texas.

(3rd Antiaircraft Artillery Automatic Weapons Battalion assigned 22 November 1949 to the 3rd Infantry Division).

=== ANNEX 2 (630th AAA-AW Bn, 43rd AAA-AW Bn) ===
Constituted 5 May 1942 in the Army of the United States as the 2nd Battalion, 504th Coast Artillery (Antiaircraft).

Activated 1 July 1942 at Camp Hulen, Texas.

Reorganized and redesignated 20 January 1943 as the 630th Coast Artillery Battalion (Antiaircraft) (Automatic Weapons).

Departed Boston Port of Embarkation 28 April 1943; arrived in North Africa 12 May 1943; moved to Italy 9 September 1943. Has credit for four campaigns in Italy.

Redesignated 12 December 1943 as the 630th Antiaircraft Artillery Automatic Weapons Battalion.

Inactivated 26 September 1945 in Italy.

Redesignated 18 June 1948 as the 43rd Antiaircraft Artillery Automatic Weapons Battalion and assigned to the 10th Infantry Division.

Activated 1 July 1948 at Fort Riley, Kansas.

== Honors ==
=== Campaign participation credit ===
War of 1812: Canada

Indian Wars: Seminoles; Washington 1858

Mexican War: Palo Alto; Resaca de la Palma; Monterey; Buena Vista; Vera Cruz; Cerro Gordo; Contreras; Churubusco; Molino del Rey; Chapultepec; Puebla 1847

Civil War: Peninsula; Antietam; Fredericksburg; Chancellorsville; Gettysburg; Wilderness; Spotsylvania; Petersburg; Shenandoah; Mississippi 1863; Tennessee 1863; Tennessee 1864; Virginia 1863

War with Spain: Manila

World War II: Naples-Foggia (with arrowhead); Anzio (with arrowhead); Rome-Arno Southern France (with arrowhead); North Apennines; Ardennes-Alsace; Central Europe; Po Valley

Korean War: CCF Intervention; First UN Counteroffensive; CCF Spring Offensive; UN Summer-Fall Offensive; Second Korean Winter; Korea, Summer-Fall 1952; Third Korean Winter; Korea, Summer 1953

Southwest Asia: Defense of Saudi Arabia; Liberation and Defense of Kuwait; Cease-Fire

=== Decorations ===
- Meritorious Unit Commendation (Army), streamer embroidered EUROPEAN THEATER (630th AAA Auto-Weapons Battalion, 19 August 1945)

== Current configuration ==
- 1st Battalion 3rd Air Defense Artillery Regiment
- 2nd Battalion 3rd Air Defense Artillery Regiment
- 3rd Battalion 3rd Air Defense Artillery Regiment
- 4th Battalion 3rd Air Defense Artillery Regiment
- 5th Battalion 3rd Air Defense Artillery Regiment

== Coat of arms ==
- Shield

Or, on a chevron gules above an imperial Chinese dragon of the like armed azure three mullets argent, on a chief of the second two pallets of the fourth an arrow in fess counterchanged.

- Crest

Out of a mural crown or masoned gules a garland the dexter branch cactus the sinister palm proper encircling a sun in splendor argent.

- Motto

Non Cedo Ferio (I Yield Not, I Strike).

=== Symbolism ===
- Shield

Scarlet is used for artillery. The two white stripes on the scarlet chief, the colors of the campaign streamers for the War of 1812, commemorate the participation of several companies of the regiment. The arrow alludes to the Indian Wars. The chevron and stars indicate service in the Civil War. The stars also refer to the numerical designation of the regiment. The dragon represents service in China; the claws and teeth are blue to indicate that elements of the regiment served in the China Relief Expedition as infantry.

- Crest

The mural crown, cactus, and palm signify the regiment's participation in the Mexican War and elements of the regiment in the Philippine Insurrection. The sun in its glory commemorates the laurels earned by the regiment during its days of glory.

== Distinctive unit insignia ==
The distinctive insignia is an adaptation of the crest and motto of the coat of arms.

== See also ==
- List of United States Regular Army Civil War units
- Field Artillery Branch (United States)
- U.S. Army Coast Artillery Corps
- Air Defense Artillery Branch (United States)
