= Fort Miley Military Reservation =

Place in California listed on National Register of historic Places

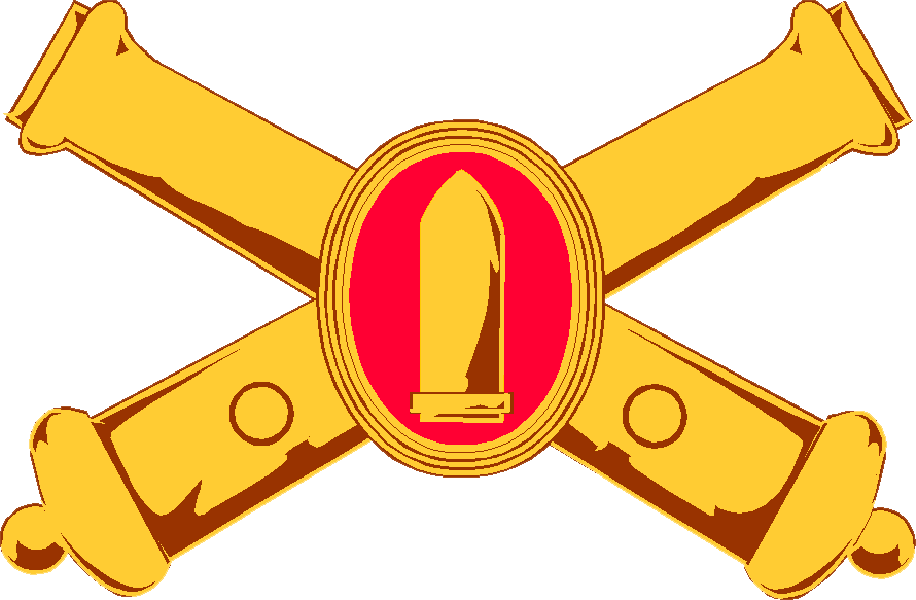
Fort Miley Military Reservation
- Near San Francisco, California in United States
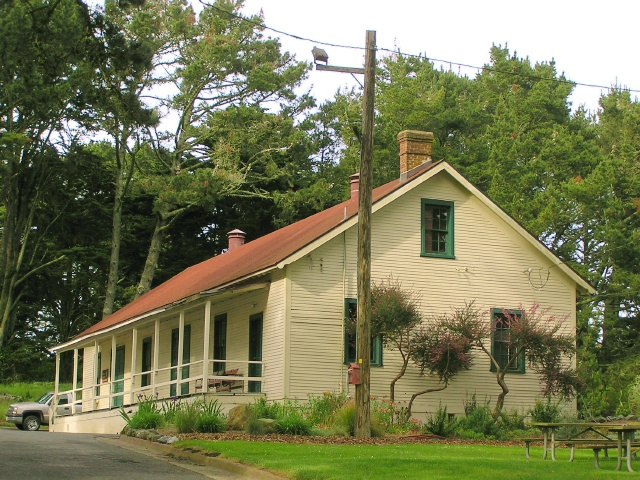
- Ordnance storehouse, the only Fort Miley building from before 1934

Site information
- Type: coastal defense
- Owner: United States Army
- Controlled by: United States Army Coast Artillery Corps

Location
- Location within San Francisco County Location within California Location within the United States
- Coordinates: 37°46′55.72″N 122°30′19.95″W
- Area: 54 acres (21.85 ha)

Site history
- Built: 1899
- Fate: Decommissioned 1948
- Fort Miley Military Reservation
- U.S. National Register of Historic Places
- Location: San Francisco, California
- NRHP reference No.: 80000371
- Added to NRHP: May 23, 1980

The Fort Miley Military Reservation, in San Francisco, California, sits on Point Lobos (not to be confused with Point Lobos near Carmel-by-the-Sea), one of the outer headlands on the southern side of the Golden Gate. Much of the site is part of the Golden Gate National Recreation Area, while the grounds and buildings that were converted into the San Francisco VA Medical Center are administered by the Veterans Health Administration of the US Department of Veterans Affairs.

== Beginnings ==
In 1885, United States Secretary of War William C. Endicott, heading the Board of Fortifications, issued a report necessitating the coastal defense of San Francisco Bay. By September 1890, Colonel George Mendel, the army engineer officer in charge of defense construction in the San Francisco region, had selected for fortification a 73-acre (29.5 ha) tract of land near Point Lobos which belonged to the City of San Francisco and since 1868 had been the Golden Gate Cemetery. After much intrigue and various maneuverings, the Federal government secured in 1891 condemnation of 54 acres (21.85 ha) for $75,000.

It was still some years before the army did anything with its new Point Lobos Military Reservation. The Spanish–American War of 1898 provided the needed stimulus and that year the first two buildings were built there to house a small Signal Corps detachment whose mission is now long forgotten, though it may have been to provide a warning of the approach of enemy ships during that war.

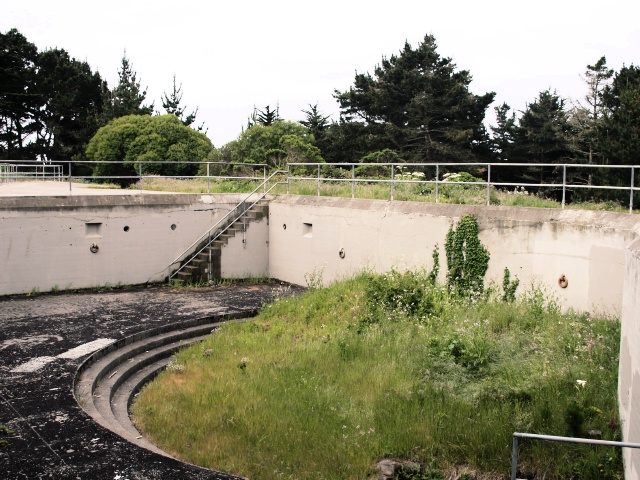
Battery Chester in 2007

The construction of fortifications as part of the Coast Defenses of San Francisco began soon afterwards. In 1899, a battery of two 12-inch rifled guns mounted on Buffington-Crozier disappearing carriages was put in, which was completed in 1902. A third 12-inch gun was added to what was now Battery James Chester in 1903. Meanwhile, work began on November 27, 1899, on a separate battery for sixteen 12-inch mortars. These weapons covered all three of the channels of approach to the Golden Gate—south, main and north.

The reservation was renamed Fort Miley in 1900 after Lieutenant Colonel John D. Miley (who was the father of Maj. Gen. William M. Miley), who had died in Manila, Philippine Islands, the year prior.

To man these two batteries the army constructed between them a parade ground and a complex of frame buildings built to then-standard plans for barracks and quarters. The basic complex was built from 1902 to 1906. The horseshoe-shaped parade ground was open to the north with a view toward the Golden Gate.

Early in the 1930s Fort Miley's parade ground, which since World War I had housed generally only caretaker garrisons, was selected as the site of the new Fort Miley Veterans Administration Hospital. The Army retained the batteries, but most of the buildings around the Parade Ground area, with the exception of an ordnance storehouse, were demolished in 1934 to make way for hospital construction.

== World War II ==
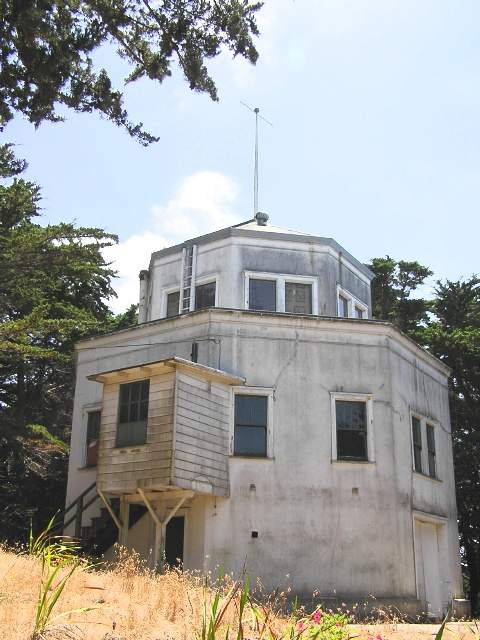
Octagonal building, Fort Miley grounds

By 1937, the army had decided that 12-inch batteries such as Chester should be abandoned when the harbor defenses could again be modernized with a new generation of defenses. However, the Japanese attack on Pearl Harbor brought the United States into the Second World War before the new modernization project was completed and Battery Chester's guns continued to play an important role in coastal defense until 1943. The Allied victories in the Pacific War that year reduced the danger of an enemy attack on San Francisco to such an extent that the army ordered Battery Chester's guns be salvaged.

Battery 243 (Construction Number) at Fort Miley was completed in 1944, designed for two 6-inch rapid-fire guns protected by steel shields rather than the traditional concrete-and-earth parapets. This type of coastal gun was considered to be of value at that late date in the war because of its function to cover the submarine minefields outside the Golden Gate, making minesweeping by the enemy difficult if not impossible. Its guns were not mounted until 1948, after most other types of coastal guns had been scrapped. This battery is historically significant because it represents one of the last phases of the traditional concept of coastal defense.

The fort's garrison included Battery F, 18th Coast Artillery from November 1941 through April 1944.

== Fort Miley today ==
The ordnance storehouse which survived the 1934 demolition is now a maintenance building for the National Park Service, although no longer on its original site. There is a walking trail east of the hospital in the area of the ordnance storehouse. This trail was resurfaced and can now accommodate wheelchairs and scooters. The remains of several pre-World War I batteries edge the perimeter of the hospital. West Fort Miley offers visitors a grassy picnic area situated among three gun emplacements, including Battery Chester. There is a ropes course on the site operated by the Pacific Leadership Institute, a research institute of the Recreation, Parks, & Tourism Department of the San Francisco State University in the stand of trees east of the Lands End parking lot.
