= Sunset Beach, Oregon =

Unincorporated community in the state of Oregon, United States

- Unincorporated community
- Location within the state of Oregon Sunset Beach (the United States)
- Coordinates: 46°6′4″N 123°55′50″W
- Country: United States
- State: Oregon
- County: Clatsop
- Elevation: 36 ft (11 m)
- Time zone: UTC-8 (Pacific (PST))
  - Summer (DST): UTC-7 (PDT)
- ZIP codes: 97148
- GNIS feature ID: 1127744

Sunset Beach is a small unincorporated community located between the cities of Seaside and Warrenton in Clatsop County, Oregon, United States. Sunset Beach is located between U.S. Route 101, Sunset Lake and the Pacific Ocean. It serves as the northernmost access to the resort community of Surf Pines, and provides motor vehicle beach access. The "Fort to Sea Trail", which follows the route used by the Lewis and Clark Expedition when hiking from Fort Clatsop to the Pacific Ocean, ends at the beach access. A beach of the same name is west of the community.

== See also ==
- Sunset Beach State Recreation Site
- Lewis and Clark National Historical Park
