= 249th Coast Artillery (United States) =

249th Coast Artillery Regiment
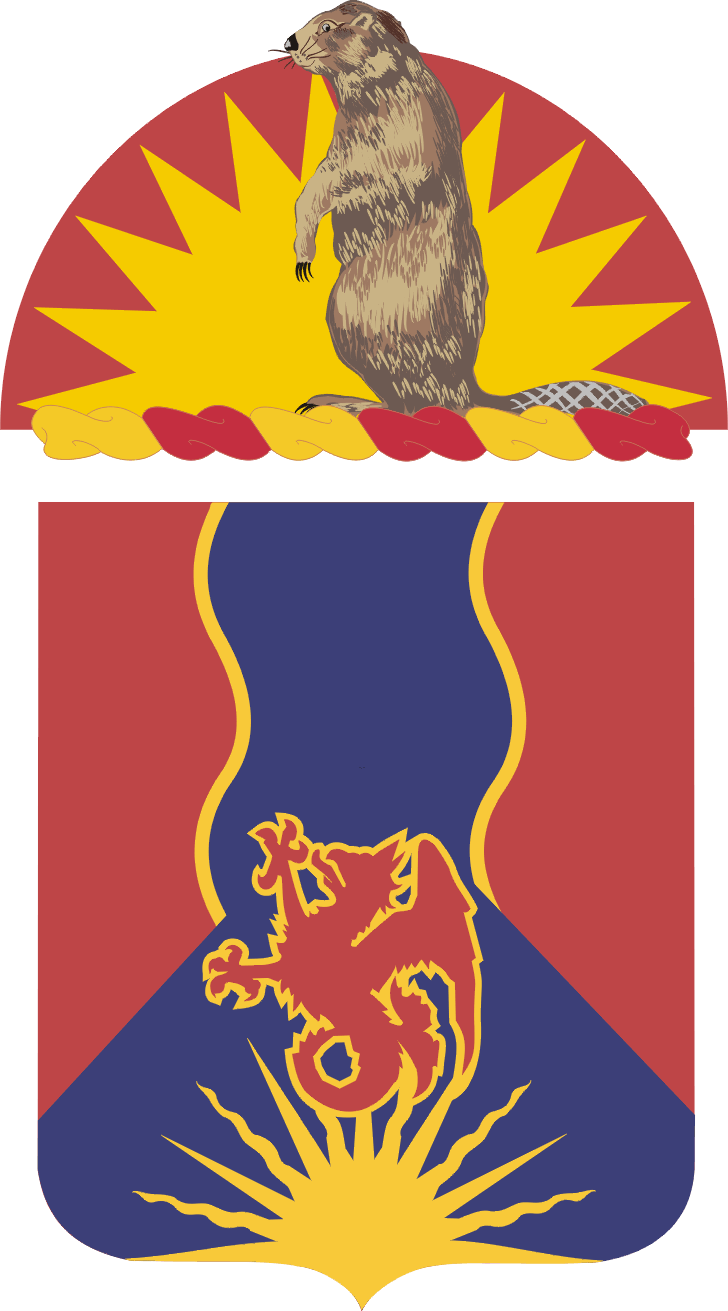
- Coat of arms
- Active: 1924 – 1944
- Country: United States
- Branch: Army
- Type: Coast artillery
- Role: Harbor defense
- Size: Regiment
- Part of: Harbor Defenses of the Columbia
- Garrison/HQ: Fort Stevens
- Motto: Cede Nullis (Second to None)
- Mascot: Oozlefinch

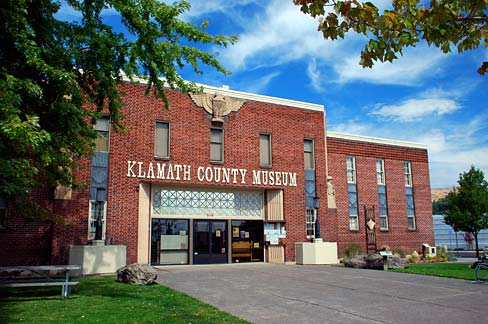
The Klamath County Museum in Klamath Falls, Oregon, formerly an armory of the 249th Coast Artillery

The 249th Coast Artillery Regiment was a Coast Artillery Corps regiment in the Oregon National Guard. It garrisoned the Harbor Defenses of the Columbia (HD Columbia), Oregon and Washington 1924–1944.

== History ==
The 249th Coast Artillery continued the history of the Coast Artillery Corps (Fixed Defenses) of the Oregon National Guard, organized in 1911. The Coast Artillery Corps included companies that manned harbor defenses during World War I and was reorganized between 1919 and 1921 with the 1st, 2nd, 3rd, and 4th Companies.

The 249th Coast Artillery was organized on 18 April 1924 as the Oregon National Guard component of the Harbor Defenses of the Columbia (HD Columbia), Oregon and Washington. Part of the 3rd Coast Artillery was the Regular Army component of those defenses 1924–1940, redesignated as the 18th Coast Artillery in 1940. The 249th's primary armory was in Salem, Oregon. In October 1944 the regiment was broken up into two battalions as part of an Army-wide reorganization.

Organized 18 April 1924 by redesignating the 249th Artillery, Coast Artillery Corps, Oregon National Guard as the 249th Coast Artillery (Harbor Defense) (HD) Regiment.

=== World War II ===
On 16 September 1940 the regiment was inducted into federal service at Salem, Oregon and moved to Camp Clatsop 23 September 1940. Moved to Fort Stevens, Oregon in HD Columbia 6 February 1941.

On 21 June 1942 the bombardment of Fort Stevens by Japanese submarine I-25 occurred with relatively minor damage.

Various exchanges of personnel occurred in HD of the Columbia between the 18th CA (HD) and the 249th CA (HD) in November 1942, August 1943, and January 1944.

On 18 October 1944 the regiment was inactivated and broken up into the 171st and 249th Coast Artillery Battalions. The 171st was organized from Headquarters and Headquarters Battery of the 2nd Battalion of the 249th, which became Headquarters and Headquarters Detachment of the battalion, and Companies C and D, which became Batteries A and B, respectively. The 249th was organized from the 1st Battalion of the 249th Coast Artillery.

These battalions were inactivated on 15 September 1945, at Fort Canby and Fort Stevens, respectively. They were perpetuated postwar by the 722nd and 732nd Antiaircraft Artillery Battalions of the Oregon Army National Guard, which were consolidated into the 249th Artillery under the Combat Arms Regimental System.

== Campaign streamers ==
World War II

- Pacific theater without inscription

== Living history group ==
As of 2016 a living history group representing Battery B, 249th Coast Artillery was active in the former HD Columbia area.

== Lineage ==
As of 2016 the 249th's heraldry was continued by the 249th Regiment (Regional Training Institute) of the Oregon Army National Guard, based in Monmouth, Oregon.

== See also ==
- Seacoast defense in the United States
- United States Army Coast Artillery Corps
- Harbor Defense Command
