= 18th Coast Artillery (United States) =

18th Coast Artillery Regiment
- Active: 1940 - 1944
- Country: United States
- Branch: Army
- Type: Coast artillery
- Role: Harbor defense
- Size: Regiment
- Part of: Harbor Defenses of San Francisco; Harbor Defenses of the Columbia
- Garrison/HQ: Fort Funston (California); Fort Stevens (Oregon)
- Motto(s): "Tam Marte Quam Minerva" (As much by the pen as the sword)
- Mascot(s): Oozlefinch

The 18th Coast Artillery Regiment was a Coast Artillery regiment in the United States Army. It was the Regular Army component of the Harbor Defenses of the Columbia, replacing the 3rd Coast Artillery there. Other elements of the regiment were also part of the Harbor Defenses of San Francisco. The regiment was active from 1940 until withdrawn in April 1944 and inactivated the following month as part of an Army-wide reorganization.

== Lineage 1 ==
Constituted as the 18th Artillery (Coast Artillery Corps) (C.A.C.) and organized October 1918 at Fort Winfield Scott, California, but demobilized in December 1918. This was one of a number of Coast Artillery regiments mobilized to operate heavy and railway artillery on the Western Front in World War I, but the Armistice resulted in the dissolution of the 18th.

== Lineage 2 ==
Constituted in the Regular Army 19 January 1940 as 18th Coast Artillery (Harbor Defense) (HD), and organized 1 February 1940 at Fort Stevens. Regimental HHB, 1st Battalion HHB, and Batteries A and B were organized 1 February 1940 by redesignating HHD, Btrys E and F, and Panama Detachment, 3rd Coast Artillery (HD) Regiment, Fort Stevens. The 18th CA (HD) relieved the 3rd CA (HD) in the Harbor Defenses of the Columbia. The 249th Coast Artillery was the Oregon National Guard component of those defenses.

- Battery C activated at Fort Stevens 3 January 1941.
- HHB 2nd Battalion and Batteries D, E, & F constituted 1 February 1940 and activated at Fort Winfield Scott in HD San Francisco 15 January 1941.
- Battery G (searchlight) activated at Fort Stevens 10 June 1941.
- Battery F moved to Fort Miley 21 November 1941.
- Regimental HHB and 2nd Battalion (less Battery F) moved to Fort Funston in HD San Francisco 7 December 1941.
- On 21 June 1942 the bombardment of Fort Stevens by Japanese submarine I-25 occurred with relatively minor damage.
- Various exchanges of personnel occurred in HD of the Columbia between the 18th CA (HD) and the 249th Coast Artillery (HD) in November 1942, August 1943, and January 1944.
- Battery G moved to Fort Canby around 1 January 1943.
- Regimental HHB ordered to XXII Corps at Camp Breckinridge, Kentucky 14 April 1944, assets absorbed by HD of the Columbia and HD San Francisco by 27 April 1944. HHB inactivated 5 May 1944.

== Campaign streamers ==
World War II

- Pacific Theater without inscription

== See also ==
- Distinctive unit insignia (U.S. Army)
- Seacoast defense in the United States
- United States Army Coast Artillery Corps
- Harbor Defense Command
