= Fort Columbia State Park =

State park in the U.S. state of Washington

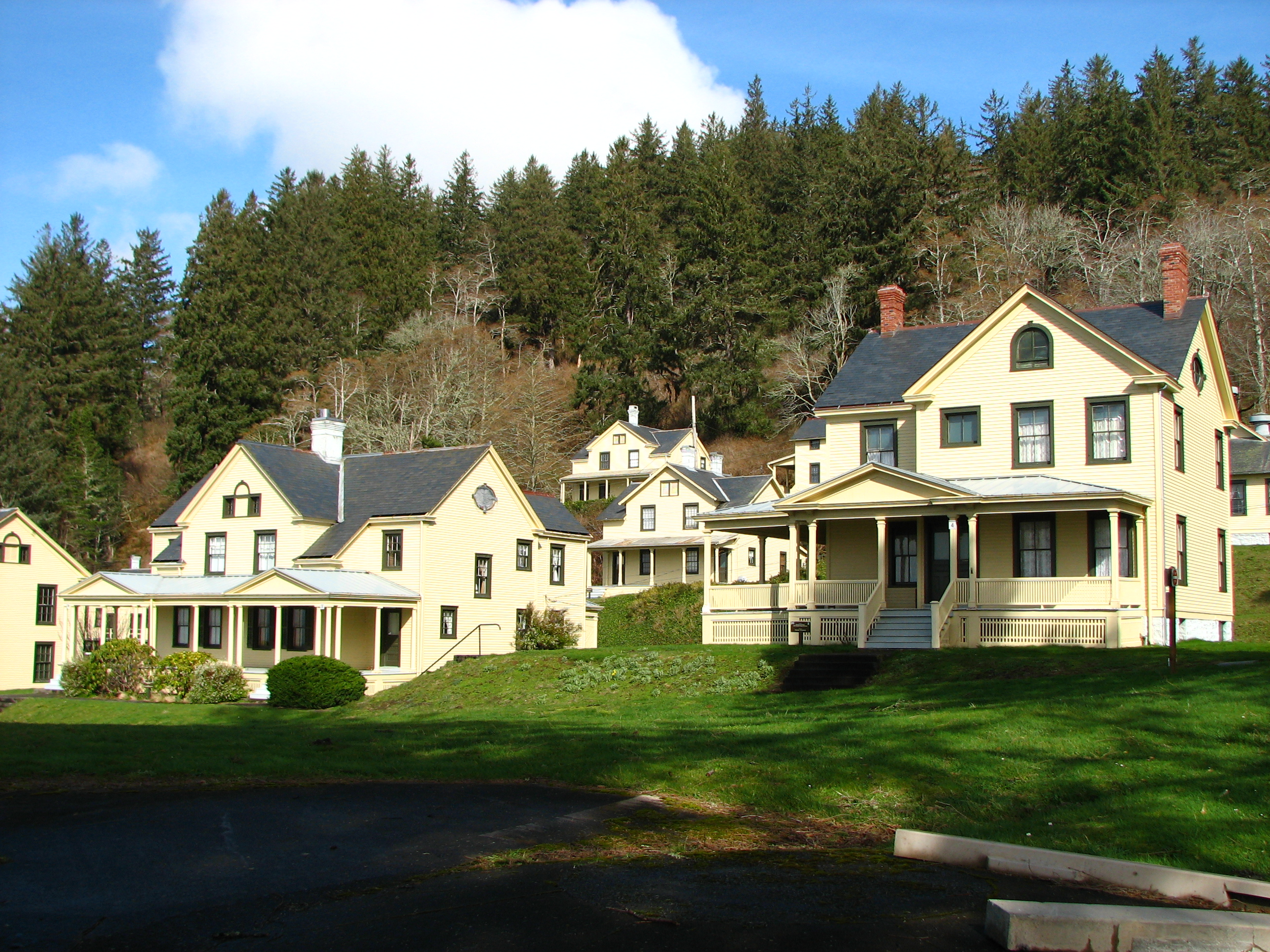
- Historic wood-frame buildings at Fort Columbia State Park

- Location within Washington (state) Location within the United States
- Location: Pacific County, Washington, United States
- Coordinates: 46°15′39″N 123°55′06″W
- Area: 618 acres (250 ha)
- Elevation: 709 ft (216 m)
- Established: 1950
- Administrator: Washington State Parks and Recreation Commission
- Visitors: 120,104 (in 2024)
- Website: Official website

Fort Columbia State Park is a public recreation area and historic preserve at the site of the former Fort Columbia, located on Chinook Point at the mouth of the Columbia River in Chinook, Washington. The 618-acre (250 ha) state park features twelve historic wood-frame buildings from the fort complex as well as an interpretive center and hiking trails. The park's grounds are located over a tunneled section of U.S. Route 101.

== History ==
Fort Columbia was built from 1896 to 1904 to support the defense of the Columbia River. The fort was constructed on the Chinook Point promontory as part of a "triangle of fire" defensive strategy that included Fort Canby and Fort Stevens. Fort Columbia was declared surplus at the end of World War II and was transferred to the custody of the state of Washington in 1950.

In the 1960s and 1970s, Battery 246 was outfitted to serve as a Civil Defense Emergency Operating Center and was one of several possible locations the governor could use in an emergency. In 1993, the park received a pair of 6-inch guns that were transferred to Battery 246 from Battery 281 at Fort McAndrew, Naval Station Argentia, Newfoundland, Canada.

== Features ==
One of the park's two coastal artillery guns

Exhibits at the Fort Columbia Interpretive Center focus on the fort's history, early exploration and pioneer history. The Commanding Officers Quarters is decorated with turn-of-the-century furnishings. The park grounds feature three artillery batteries and two coastal artillery guns that were originally installed in 1941 as part of the Harbor Defenses of Argentia and St. John's. There are picnicking facilities and 5 miles (8.0 km) of hiking trails that work their way up Scarborough Hill. Two historic homes, the Steward's House and Scarborough House, are offered for rental. The park is one of several state parks and sites in Washington and Oregon that make up the Lewis and Clark National Historical Park.
