= Sunset Beach, Alberta (disambiguation) =

Sunset Beach, Alberta may refer to:

- Sunset Beach, Alberta, a summer village in Alberta
- Sunset Beach, Bonnyville No. 87, Alberta, a locality in Bonnyville No. 87, Alberta
- Sunset Beach, St. Paul County No. 19, Alberta, a locality in St. Paul County No. 19, Alberta
