= Lewis and Clark National Historical Park =

Historic site in Oregon and Washington, United States

Lewis and Clark National and State Historical Parks
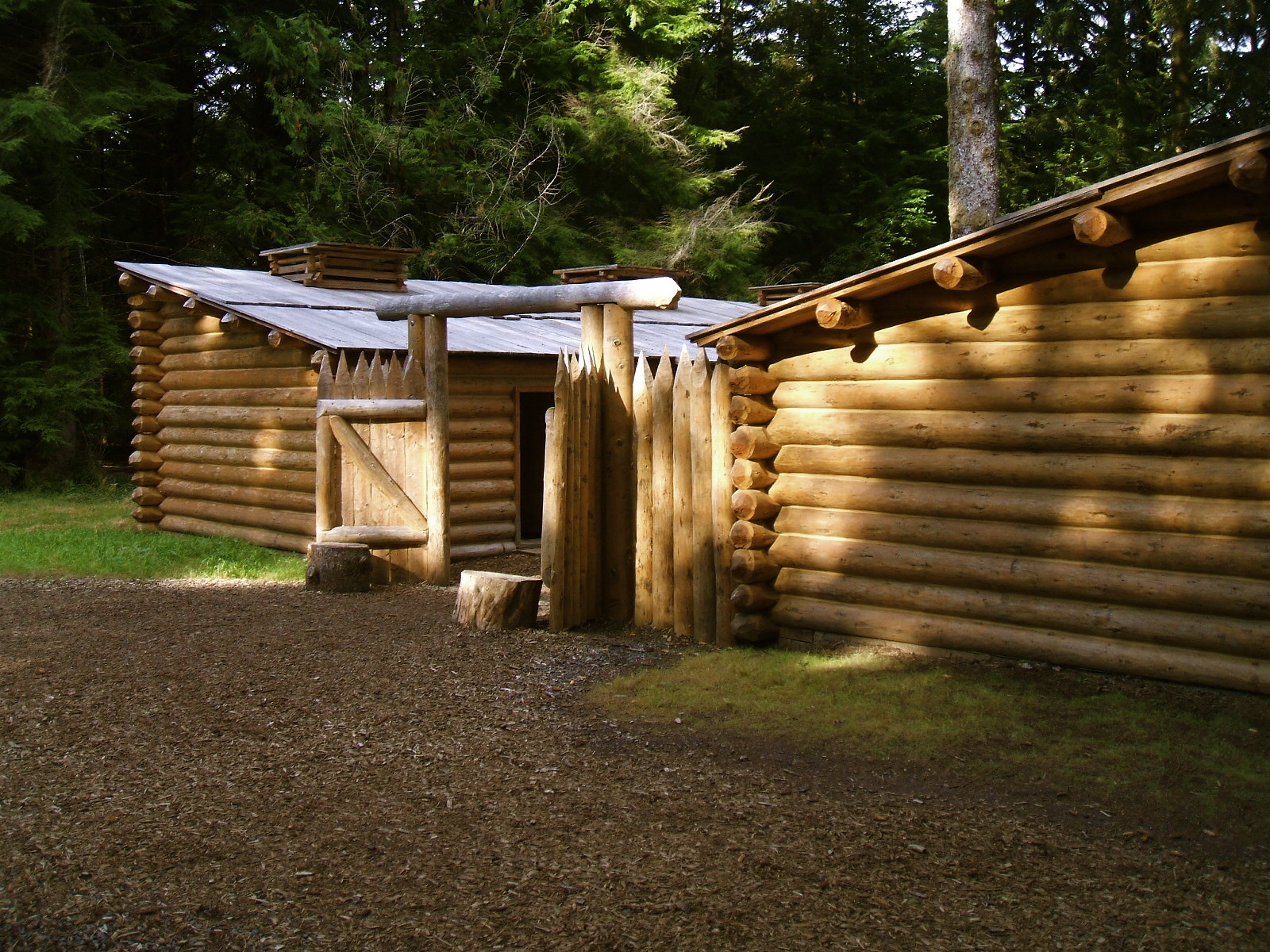
- Fort Clatsop replica built in 2007

- Location within Oregon Location within the United States
- Location: Clatsop County, Oregon and Pacific County, Washington, USA
- Nearest city: Astoria, Oregon
- Coordinates: 46°8′1″N 123°52′39″W
- Area: 3,303 acres (13.37 km^{2})
- Established: May 29, 1958
- Visitors: 244,195 (in 2025)
- Governing body: National Park Service
- Website: Lewis and Clark National Historical Park
- Fort Clatsop and the Salt Works
- U.S. National Register of Historic Places
- Area: 125 acres (51 ha)
- Built: 1805
- Architect: Capt. William Clark
- NRHP reference No.: 66000640
- Added to NRHP: October 15, 1966

The Lewis and Clark National Historical Park (including the former Fort Clatsop National Memorial), located in the vicinity of the mouth of the Columbia River, commemorates the Lewis and Clark Expedition. Administration of the park, which includes both federal and state lands, is a cooperative effort of the National Park Service and the states of Oregon and Washington. The National Historical Park was dedicated on November 12, 2004.

After reaching the Pacific Ocean, the Corps of Discovery camped at Fort Clatsop in the winter of 1805–1806. The park features a replica of the fort and a nearby visitor center. Also included in the park are several sites on the north bank of the river in Washington and other sites in Oregon.

== Lewis and Clark National Historical Park ==
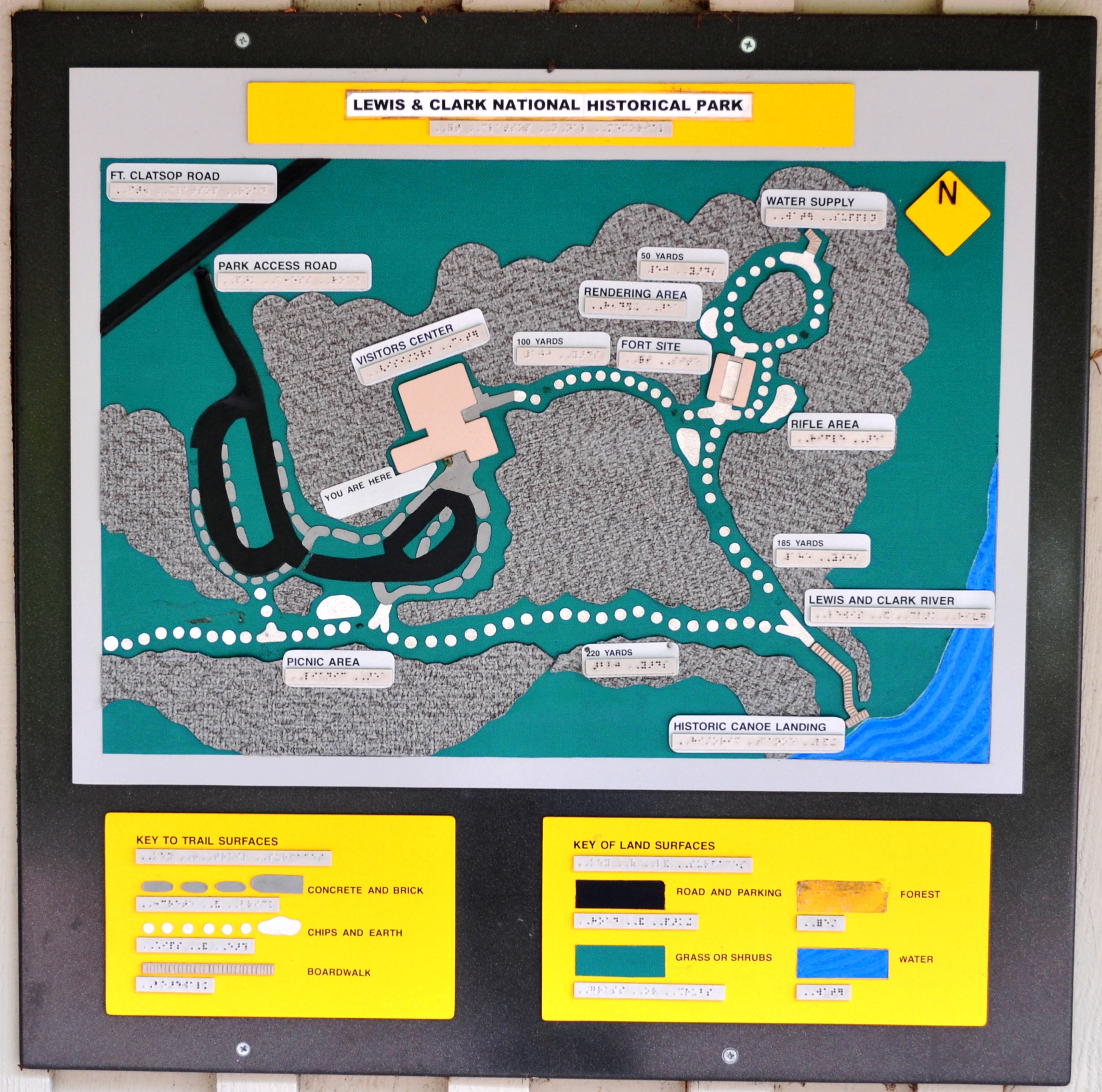
This map outside the Lewis and Clark National Historical Park visitor center points visitors to the various historical landmarks within the park, including the reconstructed Fort Clatsop.

The federal park began as Fort Clatsop National Memorial which was established on May 29, 1958. The memorial was listed on the National Register of Historic Places on October 15, 1966. On October 30, 2004, it was redesignated Lewis and Clark National Historical Park with expanded jurisdiction over multiple sites, including:

- Fort Clatsop
- Fort to Sea Trail (dedicated on November 14, 2005)
- Netul Landing (on the Lewis and Clark River, about a mile to the south of Fort Clatsop)
- Salt Works
- Station Camp/Middle Village
- Clark's Dismal Nitch

== Oregon State Parks ==
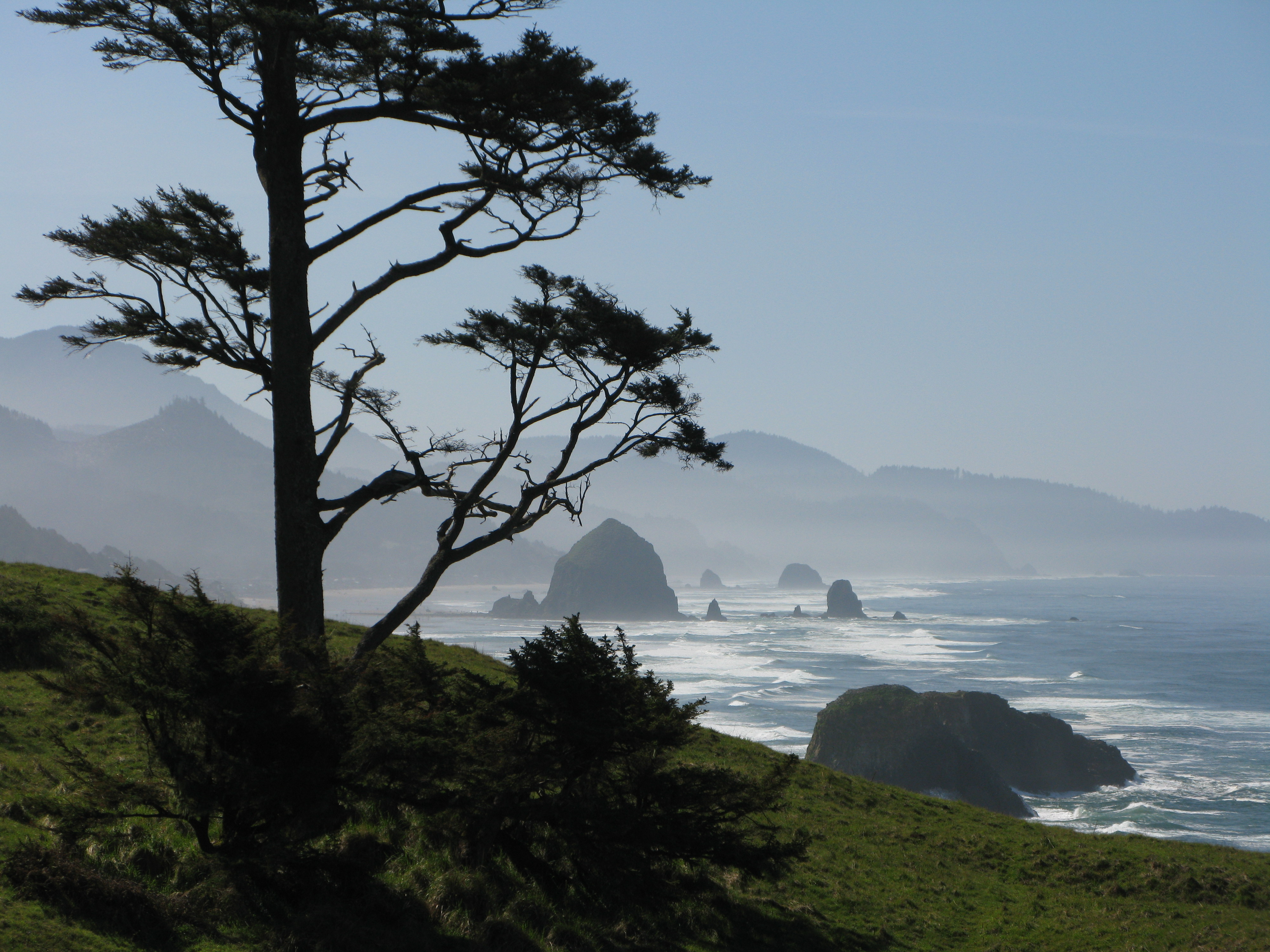
Southern view of the coast from Ecola State Park. Haystack Rock can be seen in the distance.

=== Ecola State Park ===
Ecola State Park was the site of the Corps of Discovery's 1806 trek over difficult terrain to see a beached whale. Today, it features several miles of hiking trails through old-growth forest and several beaches. Haystack Rock and the Needles are visible from many sites in the park.

=== Fort Stevens State Park ===
Fort Stevens, with its 3,700-acre (1,500 ha) park, offers exploration of history, nature, and recreational opportunities. The fort was the Oregon component of the three-fort Harbor Defense Command area at the mouth of the Columbia River (Fort Canby and Fort Columbia were the other two).

=== Sunset Beach State Recreation Site ===
Sunset Beach is the terminus of the Fort To Sea Trail, which begins in Fort Clatsop. Sunset Beach also provides visitors with direct access to the Pacific Ocean with expansive views from Cape Disappointment to the north and Tillamook Head to the south.

== Washington State Parks ==
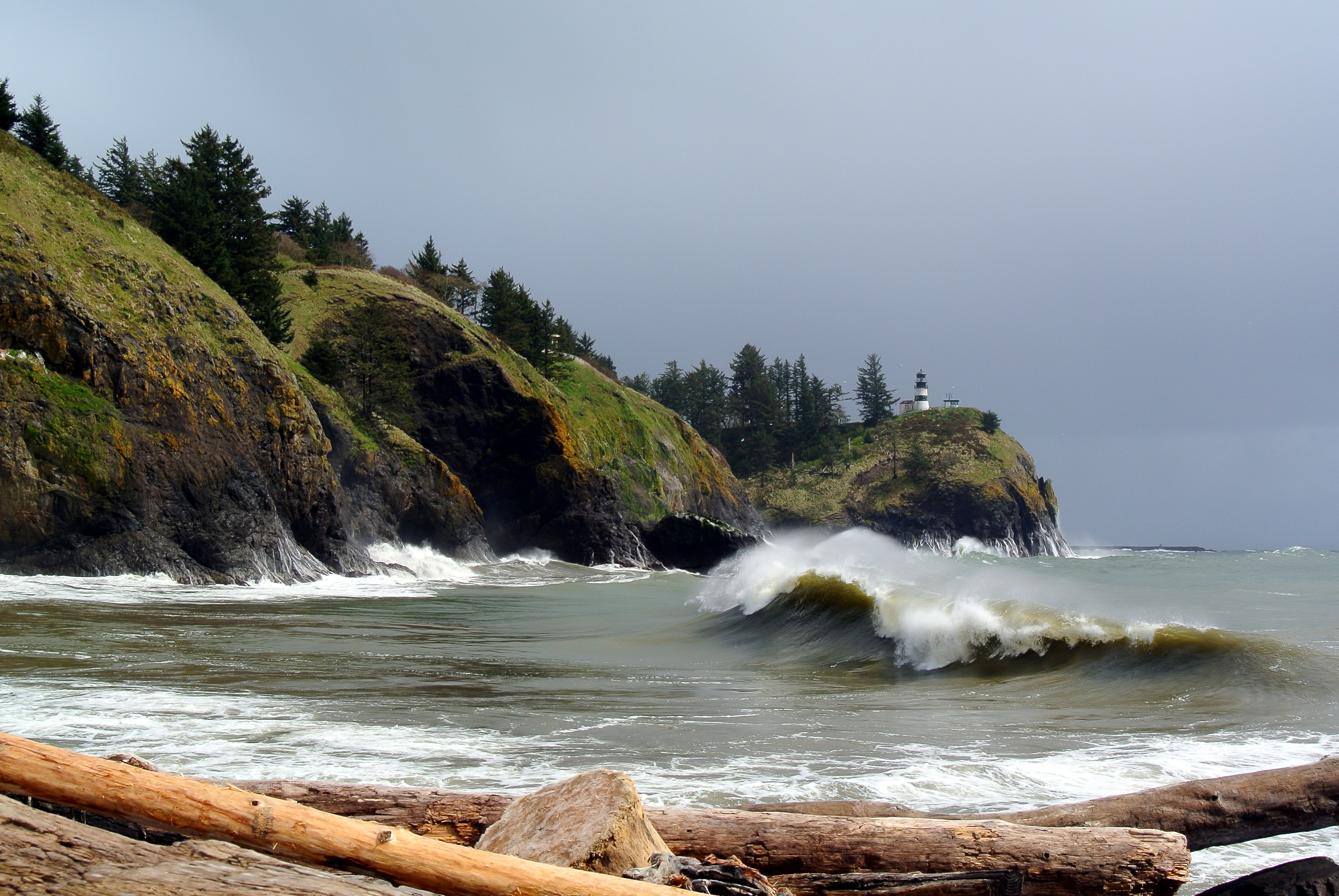
South end of Cape Disappointment and its lighthouse

=== Cape Disappointment State Park ===
Cape Disappointment State Park, formerly known as Fort Canby State Park, is a 1,882-acre (762 ha) camping park on Cape Disappointment on the Long Beach Peninsula, fronted by the Pacific Ocean. The park offers 27 miles (43 km) of ocean beach, two lighthouses, an interpretive center, hiking trails, and the remains of Fort Canby. The Cape Disappointment Historic District was listed on the National Register on August 15, 1975.

=== Fort Columbia State Park ===
Fort Columbia State Park preserves Fort Columbia, a coastal artillery post along the north side of the Columbia river outlet. At 593 acres (240 ha), the park includes an interpretive center focused on the fort and regional history.

Chinook Point, the site from which an American captain, Robert Gray, first saw the Columbia River, is part of the park. His explorations gave the United States a strong position in its later territorial contests with Great Britain. Chinook Point was named a National Historic Landmark in 1961.

== See also ==
- Columbia Bar
- Timeline of the Lewis and Clark Expedition
