= Sunset Beach State Recreation Site =

State park in Oregon, USA

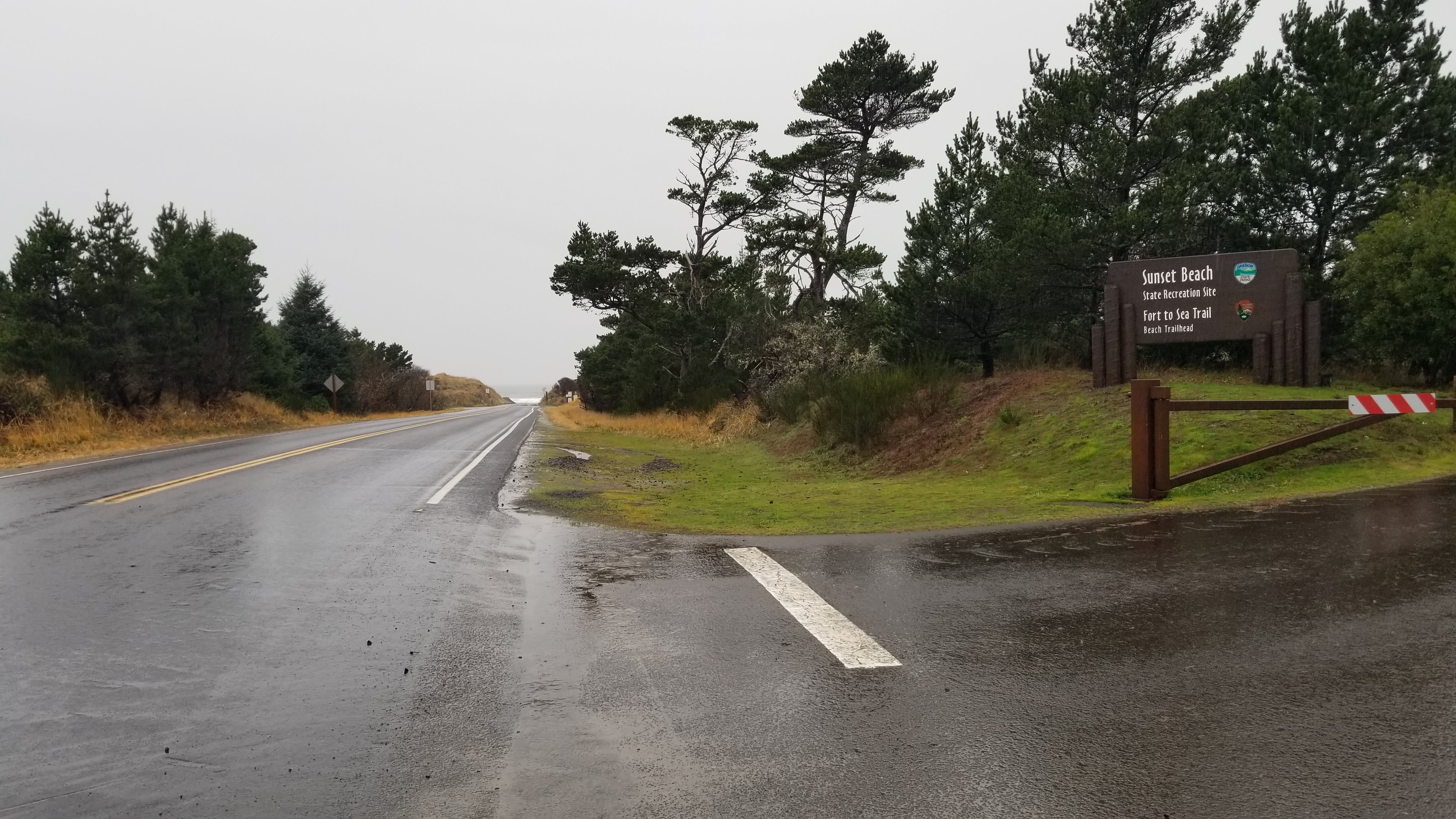
- The road extends west past the Sunset Beach State Recreation Site parking area. Driving street legal motor vehicles is allowed on parts of this beach.

- Location within Oregon Location within the United States
- Type: Public, state
- Location: Clatsop County, Oregon
- Nearest city: Astoria
- Coordinates: 46°05′57″N 123°56′21″W
- Operator: Oregon Parks and Recreation Department

Sunset Beach State Recreation Site is a state park in Clatsop County, Oregon, United States, administered by the Oregon Parks and Recreation Department. The park comprises 120 acres (49 ha) along the Pacific Ocean on the Clatsop Plains.

In February 2024, a male fin whale washed onto the beach. The 46 foot (14 metres) endangered mammal was underweight and had been entangled in rope. It was only the second fin whale to be recorded as washing ashore in the state in 30 years. The National Oceanic and Atmospheric Administration (NOAA) cautioned visitors to remain out of distance from the carcass due to needs for a necropsy and concerns of disease.

== See also ==
- Lewis and Clark National Historical Park
- List of Oregon state parks
- Sunset Beach, Oregon
