= Chinook Point =

- U.S. National Register of Historic Places
- U.S. National Historic Landmark
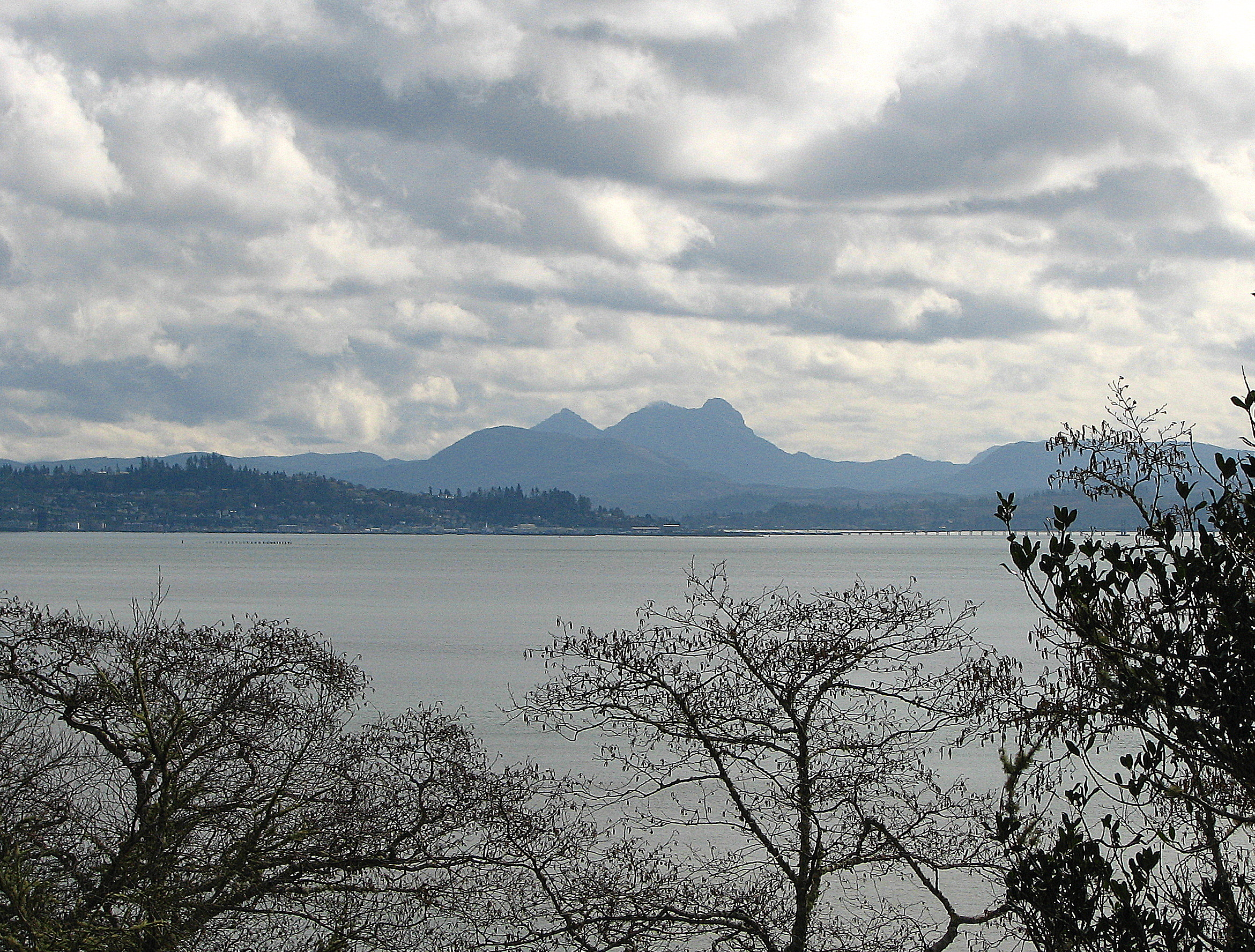
- View from Fort Columbia across the mouth of the Columbia River to Astoria, Oregon, and Saddle Mountain.

- Location within Washington (state) Location within the United States
- Nearest city: Chinook, Washington
- Coordinates: 46°15′5″N 123°55′19″W
- Area: 286 acres (116 ha)
- Built: 1792
- NRHP reference No.: 66000747

Significant dates
- Added to NRHP: October 15, 1966
- Designated NHL: July 4, 1961

Chinook Point is a headland in Pacific County, Washington. Located just northwest of the mouth of the Columbia River, it is historically significant for several reasons. Captain Robert Gray, the first non-native to enter the river, saw it from Chinook Point in 1792. In 1805, it was the site of an encampment by the Lewis and Clark Expedition. It has been the site of military fortifications since 1864, most notably in the late 1890s, when most of the presently surviving Fort Columbia structures were built. The point, which constitutes the most developed portion of Fort Columbia State Park, was designated a National Historic Landmark in 1961.

== Description and history ==
Chinook Point is a hilly promontory on the north bank of the Columbia River, roughly east of its actual mouth, which is marked on the north by Cape Disappointment and the south by Point Adams. The point is fortified with the remains of Fort Columbia, which include thirteen buildings erected in 1902, and three artillery emplacements installed between 1897 and 1900.

The mouth of the Columbia River, the major river of the northwestern United States, was almost discovered several times before Captain Robert Gray spotted it in 1792. Spanish explorer Bruno de Heceta saw both Cape Disappointment and Point Adams, but illness aboard ship prevented him from exploring further, and his ship was then driven out to sea by currents. Heceta recorded his opinion that there was a river mouth in the vicinity. British Captain James Cook explored the coastline in 1778, but missed the entrance bay entirely due to bad weather. In April 1792, Captain George Vancouver also sailed the area, but did not see the river mouth. Also in April 1792, Captain Gray made note of the strong currents, but was unable to enter the river mouth. He returned in May, and succeeded in entering the river on May 11. This formally established an American claim to the region that withstood later challenges. Gray made a landfall near Chinook Point to trade with the local Chinook people, for whom the point is named. When the Lewis and Clark Expedition was organised in the early 19th century, the river named Columbia by Gray was one of its objectives. The expedition reached Chinook Point in November 1805.

The area became of military interest in the 1860s, when the United States embarked on a systematic improvements to its coastal defenses, including in the Pacific Northwest. A military reservation was established at Chinook Point in 1864, but was not significantly developed. It was not until 1898, when both the Spanish–American War and heightened tension with Britain over the Alaska boundary dispute prompted formal development.

Chinook Point is now part of Fort Columbia State Park, which is in turn part of the Lewis and Clark National Historical Park, a series of preserved sites commemorating the Lewis and Clark Expedition.

== See also ==
- List of Washington state parks
- List of National Historic Landmarks in Washington (state)
- National Register of Historic Places in Pacific County, Washington
