= Mullet Key =

Archaeological site in Florida, United States

- U.S. National Register of Historic Places
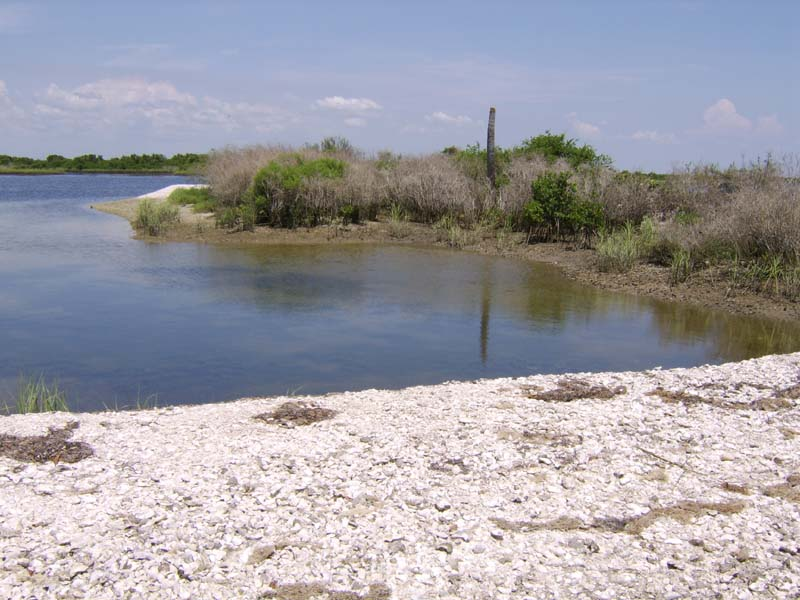

- Location within Florida Location within the United States
- Location: Citrus County, Florida
- Nearest city: Crystal River
- Coordinates: 28°52′51″N 82°41′33″W
- NRHP reference No.: 86001409
- Added to NRHP: July 3, 1986

Mullet Key is a historic island near Crystal River, Florida. It is located 3 miles south of the main mouth of the Crystal River, and was inhabited by Native Americans in pre-Columbian times. The island was occupied from roughly 500 to 1500 and was inhabited by the Deptford and Safety Harbor cultures. Oyster shell middens have been found at the site. On July 3, 1986, it was added to the U.S. National Register of Historic Places.

== In popular culture ==
Mullet Key is referenced in the movie The Punisher.
