= Fort Stevens (Oregon) =

Former U.S. military installation in Hammond, Oregon, in use from 1863-1947; now a park

Coordinates: 46°12′7″N 123°57′45″W

- Warrenton, Clatsop County, Oregon
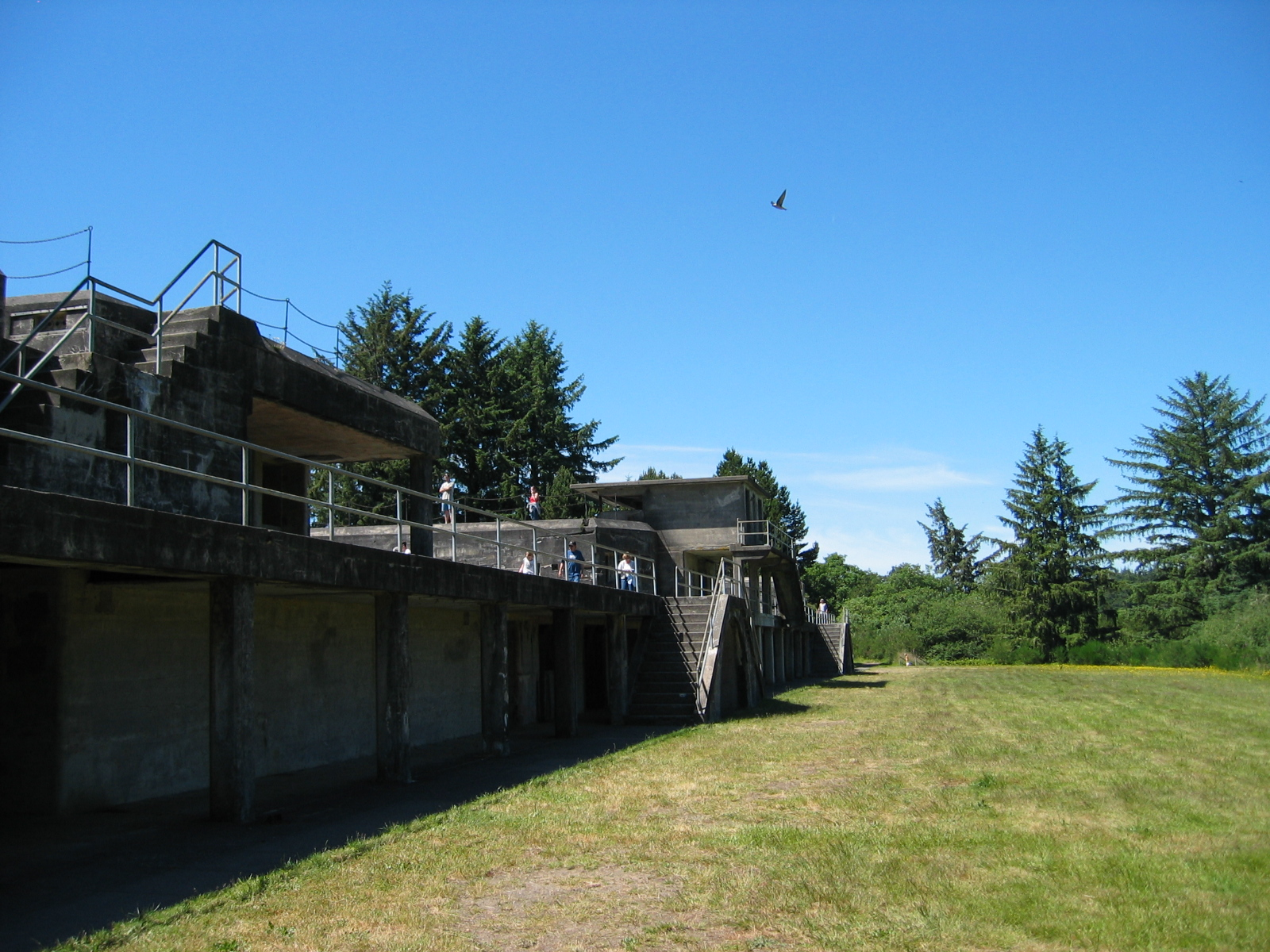

Site information
- Type: Military base
- Controlled by: United States Army
- Condition: Preserved

Site history
- Built: 1863
- In use: 1863–1947
- Materials: Concrete, steel
- Battles/wars: Bombardment of Fort Stevens
- Events
- Fort Stevens
- U.S. National Register of Historic Places
- Location within Oregon Location within the United States
- Location: Fort Stevens State Park, Hammond, Oregon
- Area: 542 acres (219 ha)
- Built: 1863
- NRHP reference No.: 71000678
- Added to NRHP: September 22, 1971

Fort Stevens was an American military installation that guarded the mouth of the Columbia River in the state of Oregon. Built near the end of the American Civil War, it was named for Civil War general and former Washington Territory governor Isaac I. Stevens. The fort was an active military reservation from 1863–1947. It is now listed on the National Register of Historic Places.

Today the site is an Oregon state park just northwest of Warrenton.

== History ==
=== Civil War ===
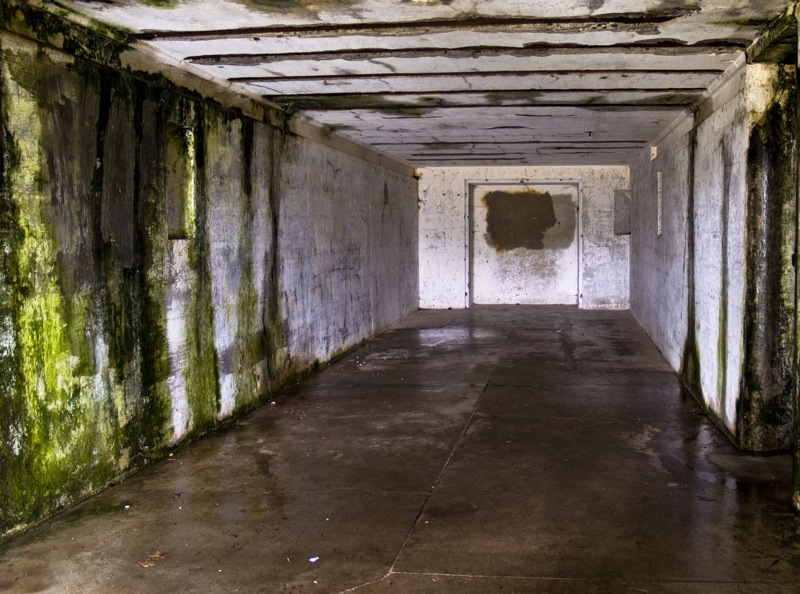
Interior of the abandoned fort

The fort was constructed in 1863-64 during the Civil War as an earthwork battery on the south shore of the mouth of the Columbia River, and was known as the Fort at Point Adams. It was later renamed as Fort Stevens in 1865, in honor of the former territorial governor of Washington, Isaac Stevens, who had been killed in action at the Battle of Chantilly during the American Civil War.

Fort Stevens was the primary military installation in what became the "Three Fort Harbor Defense System" at the mouth of the Columbia River. The other forts were the Post at Cape Disappointment, later Fort Cape Disappointment and later Fort Canby, built at the same time as Fort Stevens, and Fort Columbia, built between 1896 and 1904. Both are on the Washington side of the river. The fort was meant to defend the mouth of the Columbia from potential British attack during the Pig War of 1859 and subsequent ongoing regional tensions through 1870 in the San Juan Islands, and was important during the 1896–1903 Alaska Boundary Dispute, when British-American tensions again were high and the two countries were on the brink of war.

=== Peter Iredale ===
In 1906, the crew of the sailing ship Peter Iredale took refuge at Fort Stevens, after she ran aground on Clatsop Spit. The wreck is visible today, within the boundaries of Fort Stevens State Park.

=== World War II ===
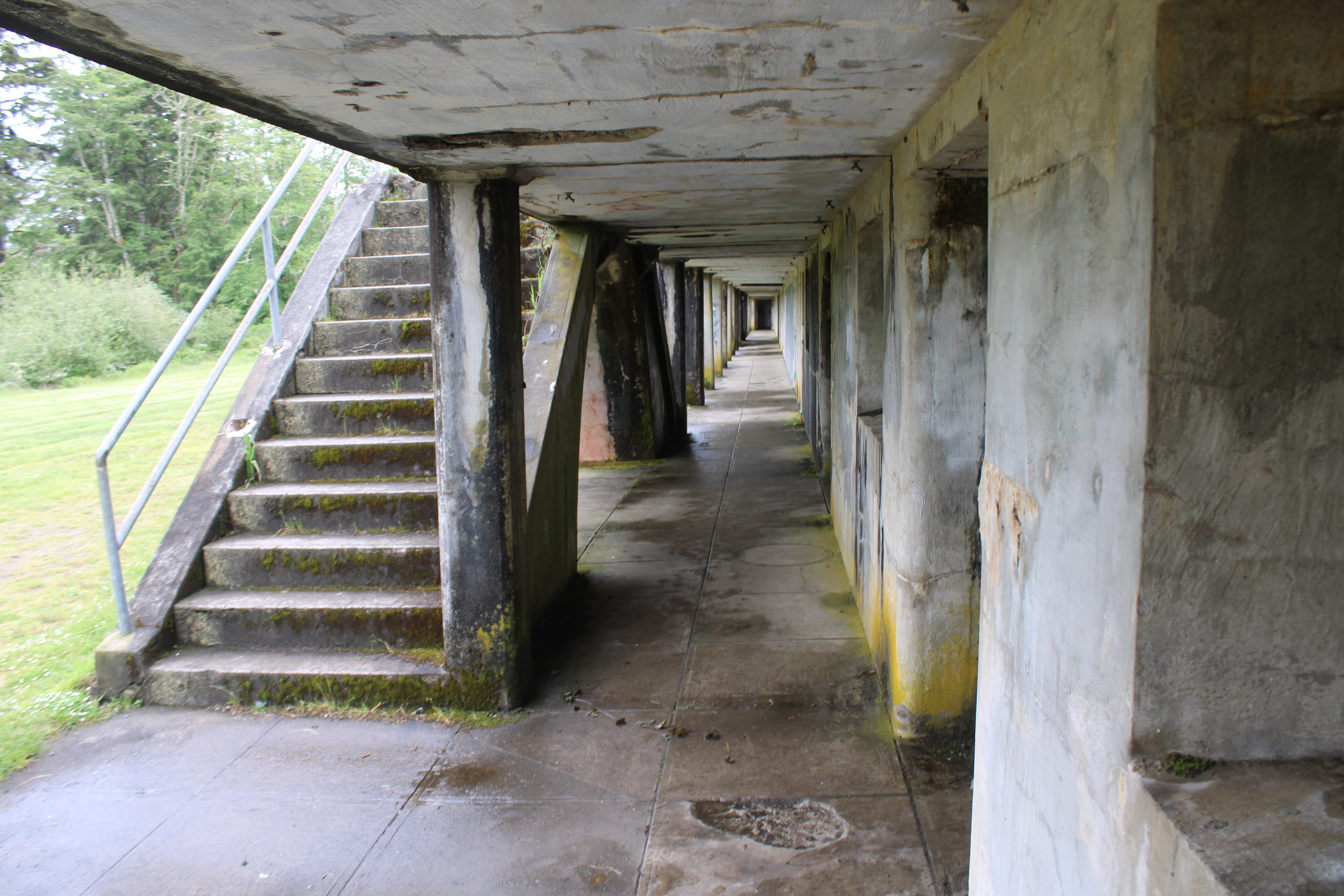
Battery Russell is still accessible for visitors

After World War I, the U.S. Navy established a radio station at Fort Stevens for communication with the fleet. Additionally, in 1932 the Navy co-located a secret radio intercept station at Fort Stevens to listen in on Japanese Navy coded messages. Specially trained radiomen from the "On-the-Roof-Gang" were stationed at the listening post. The station was designated "S" because of the Fort Stevens location. It was designated to be restored as a historical monument by the federal government in 1936. In September 1939, the U.S. Navy relocated Station S to Fort Ward on Bainbridge Island, Washington because of better intercept conditions.

On the night of June 21–22, 1942, the Japanese submarine I-25 surfaced off Fort Stevens and fired 17 shells 14 cm-caliber deck gun, making Fort Stevens the first military installation in the contiguous United States to come under enemy fire in World War II. The Japanese attack caused no damage to the fort itself, only destroying the backstop of the post's baseball field.

The garrison of Fort Stevens during World War II included elements of two regiments, the 249th Coast Artillery (Oregon National Guard) and the 18th Coast Artillery of the Regular Army.

Fort Stevens was decommissioned in 1947. All the armaments were removed and buildings were auctioned. The grounds were transferred to the U.S. Army Corps of Engineers, until finally being turned over to the Oregon Parks and Recreation Department in 1975.

== State park ==
Much of Fort Stevens is preserved within Fort Stevens State Park, part of the Lewis and Clark National Historical Park. The 3,700-acre (15 km^{2}) park includes camping, beach access, swimming at Coffenbury Lake, trails, and a military history museum. As of 2019, it was the eighth busiest park in the state's park system with 1,197,738 visitors that year.

The large state park boasts full hook-up campsites, primitive and electrical sites, yurts, and deluxe cabins; most are pet-friendly. The campgrounds have full-use facilities nearby and there are over nine miles of paved bicycle trails, fishing, a historic shipwreck, and underground tours of the military battery.

== In the media ==
=== Television ===
Fort Stevens was featured on an episode of Ghost Adventures entitled "Graveyard of the Pacific: Commander's House" that aired in 2018 on the Travel Channel. The team of paranormal investigators explored Battery Mishler, one of the artillery stations with underground tunnels at the fort where eyewitnesses report seeing a male shadow figure in the magazine room. The fort is also said to be haunted by a soldier (August Stallberger) who was mysteriously beaten to death by "person(s) unknown" while on duty in 1868.

== Gallery ==
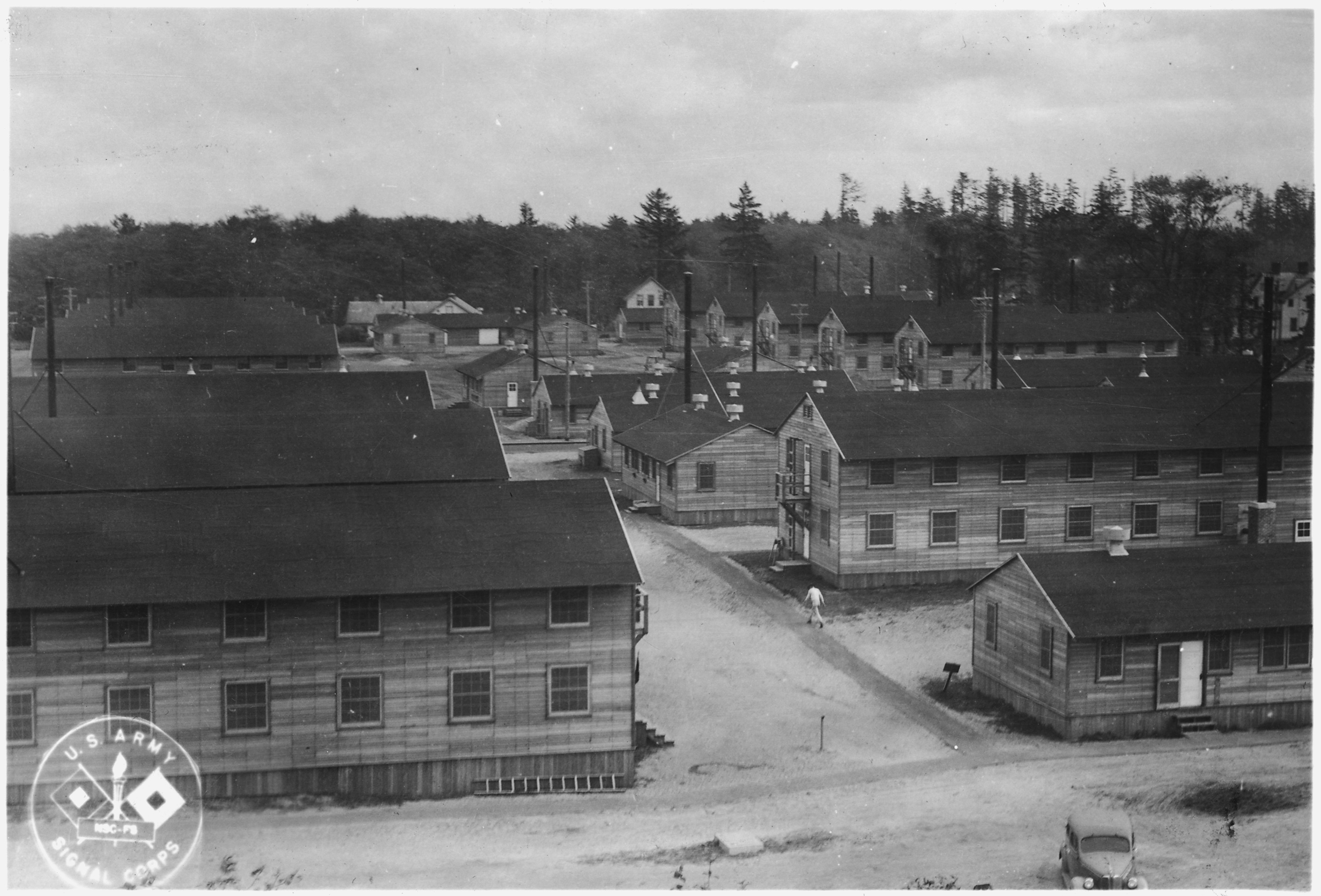
Buildings at Fort Stevens

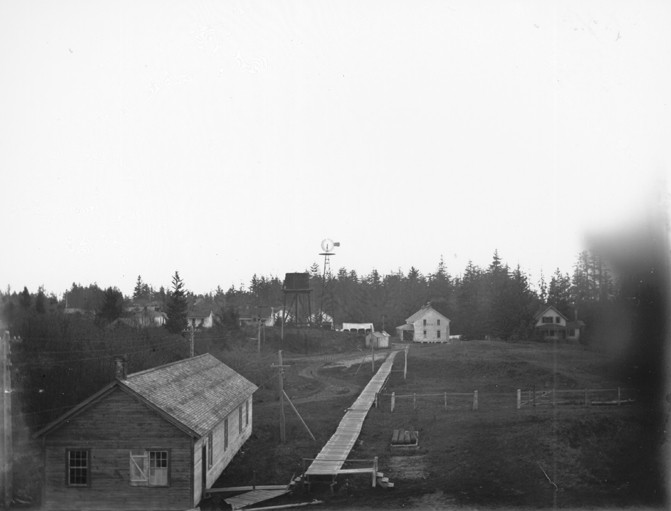
Fort Stevens in 1900.

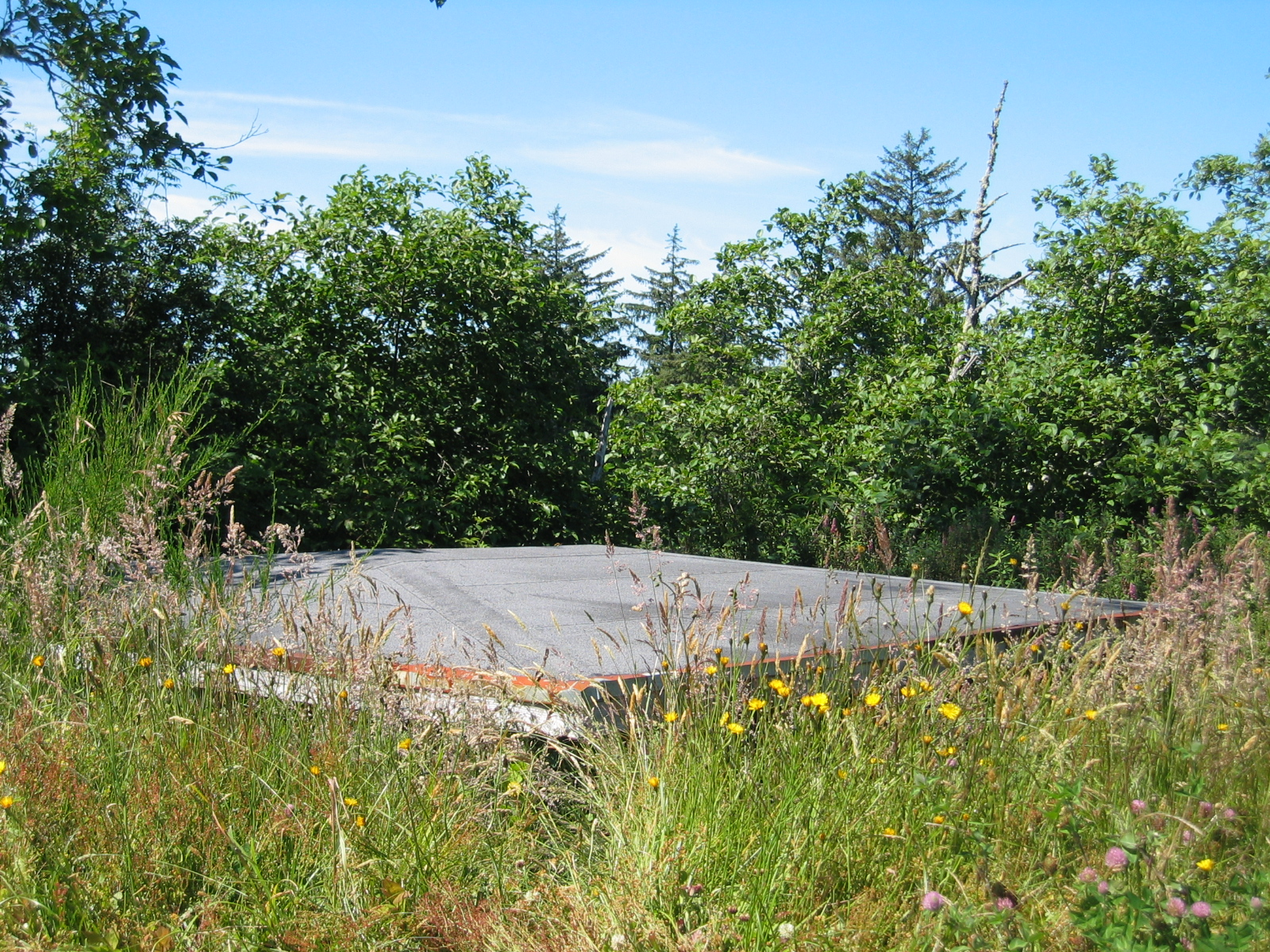
Bunker along the fort.

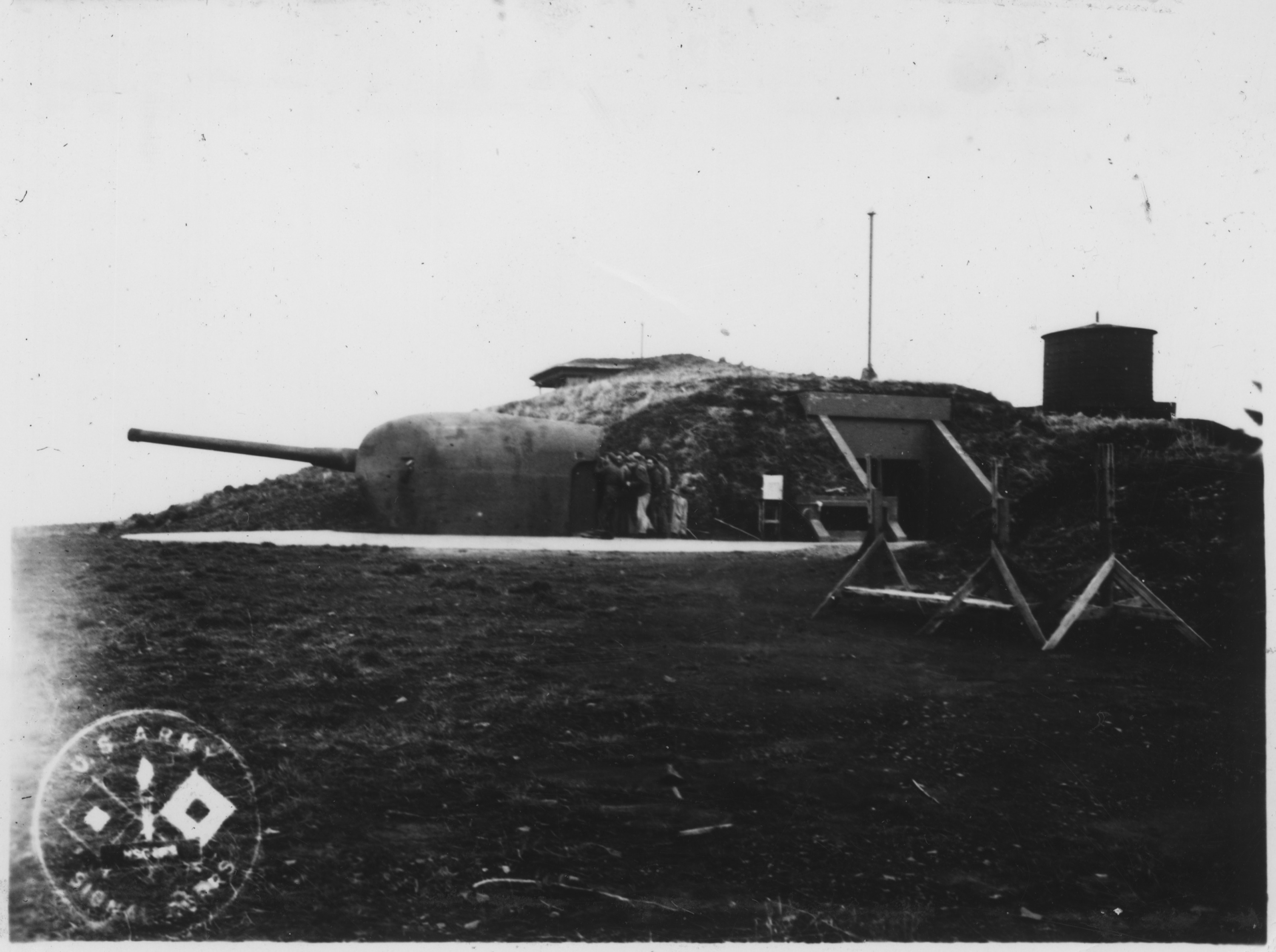
Battery 245, two 6-inch guns on shielded barbette carriages, built in World War II. The battery's ammunition and fire control bunker is behind the gun.

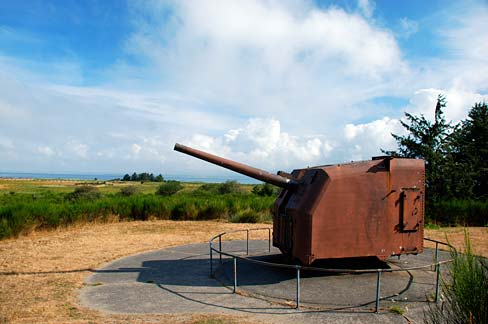
Artillery gun.

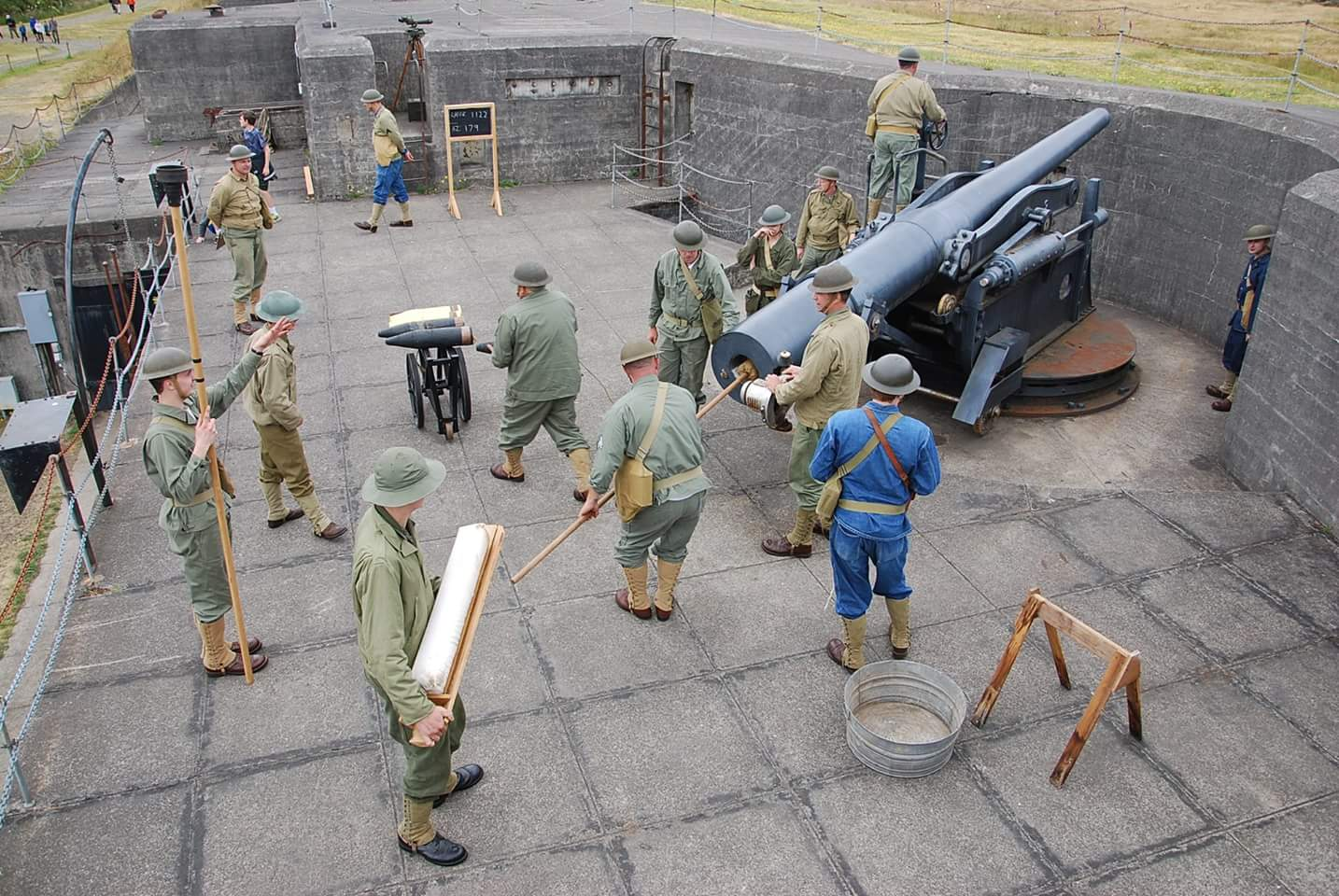
249th Coast Artillery, Living History Group.

== See also ==
- Board of Fortifications
- Attacks on United States territory in North America during World War II
- Oregon Coast Trail, the northern terminus is in Fort Stevens
