= Fort Gorges =

- U.S. National Register of Historic Places
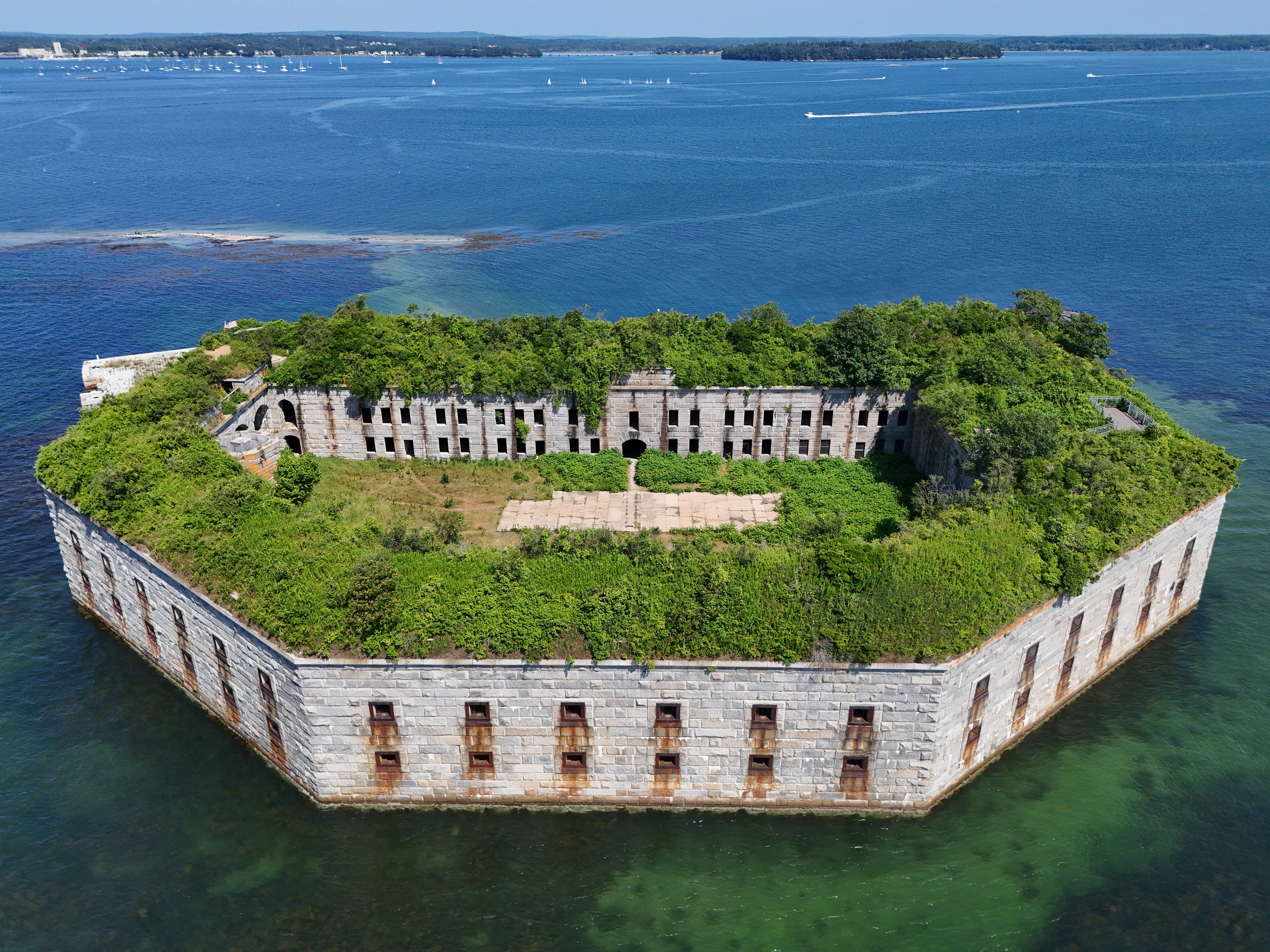
- Fort Gorges

- Location within Maine Location within the United States
- Location: E of Portland on Hog Island, Portland Harbor
- Nearest city: Portland, Maine
- Coordinates: 43°39′47″N 70°13′17″W
- Area: 6 acres (2.4 ha)
- Built: 1858
- NRHP reference No.: 73000114
- Added to NRHP: August 28, 1973

Fort Gorges is a former United States military fort built on Hog Island Ledge in Casco Bay, Maine, United States. Built from 1858 to 1865, no battles were fought there and no troops were stationed there. Advancing military technology, including iron clad ships and long range guns, rendered the fort obsolete before it could be used. The fort is now a park, accessible only by boat. It was added to the National Register of Historic Places in 1973.

== History ==
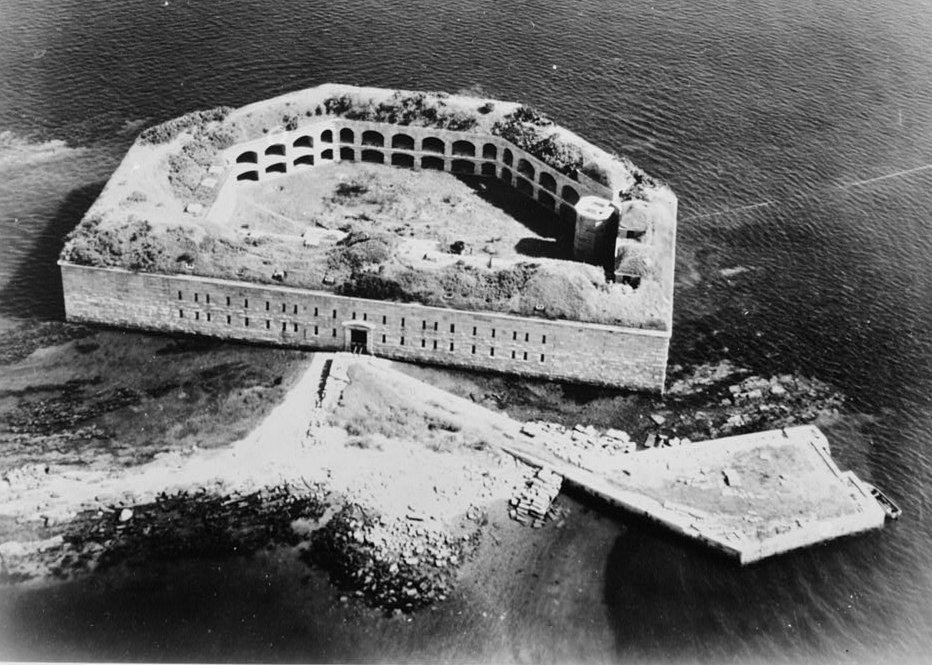
Fort Gorges in the 1930s

Following the War of 1812, the United States Army Corps of Engineers proposed that a fort be built on Hog Island Ledge, in Casco Bay at the entrance to the harbor at Portland, Maine. It was part of the third system of US fortifications. Named for the colonial proprietor of Maine, Sir Ferdinando Gorges, it was constructed to support existing forts, including Fort Preble in South Portland and Fort Scammel built on nearby House Island in 1808. Congress, however, did not fund construction of Fort Gorges until 1857. The walls of the fort were begun the next year, and when the American Civil War broke out in 1861, work quickly advanced.

The fort was designed by Colonel Reuben Staples Smart. The chief architect in charge of construction was Thomas Lincoln Casey, who later became Chief of Engineers. It is similar in size and construction to Fort Sumter, but is built of granite instead of brick.

The fort was completed in 1865 as the war ended. Modern explosives made the fort obsolete by the time it was completed. A modernization plan was begun in 1869, but funding was cut off in 1876, with the third level of the fort still unfinished. During the modernization project, sod-covered sand was added to the top level of the fort to protect gun encasements and powder magazines from attacks.

The fort's armament consisted of thirty-four 10-inch Rodman guns mounted in the fort's casemates. In 1898, all guns were removed from the fort except a large 300-pounder (10 in (254 mm)) Parrott rifle which was on the top of the fort but not mounted.

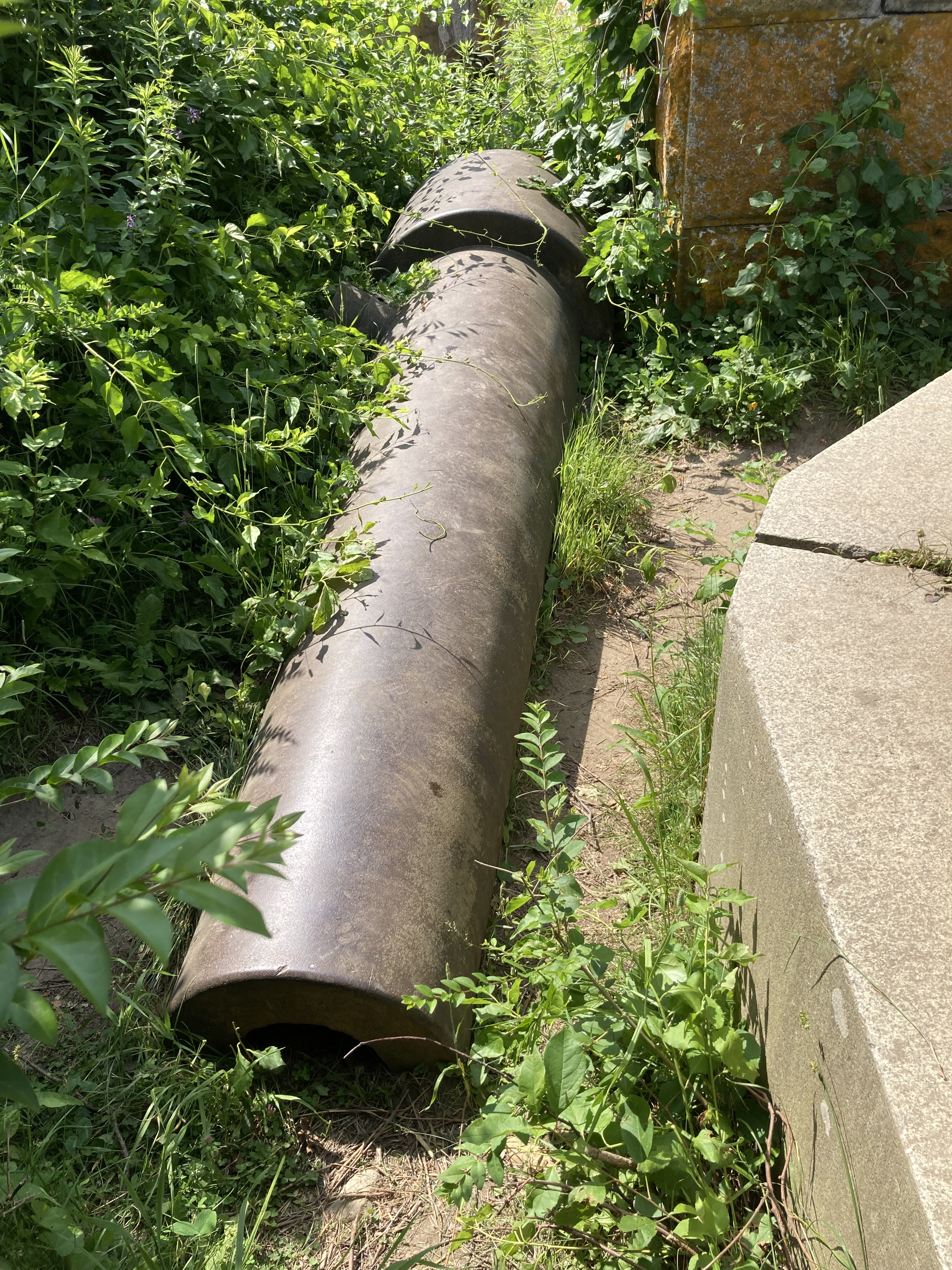
300-pounder Parrott Rifle located at Fort Gorges

The 300-pounder Parrott rifle still remains in place and is one of the largest surviving specimens of Civil War vintage artillery.

The fort was last used by the Army during World War II, when it was used to store submarine mines.

It was acquired by the city of Portland in 1960 and placed on the National Register of Historic Places in 1973. It is now open to the public as a park, and is accessible only by private boat or hired water taxi. Visitors are recommended to carry a flashlight to enter the powder magazines. The fort is in need of restoration.

In 1983, the Maine State Legislature passed a law guaranteeing the state the right of first refusal in any future sale of Fort Gorges by the city of Portland.

Friends of Fort Gorges initiated a $250,000 fundraising campaign for money to make critical repairs to the facility in the summer of 2019. Another $250,000 would come from the City of Portland. In 2021, the island's first city-permitted event took place and 49 people visited the island for a fundraiser while others watched online because of COVID-19 restrictions. Previously, Portland developer Mike Dugay proposed converting the location into a commercial space to include a bed and breakfast, restaurant, and brewery.

== See also ==
- National Register of Historic Places listings in Portland, Maine
- Seacoast defense in the United States
- List of coastal fortifications of the United States
