= Seacoast defense in the United States =

Coastal forts construction and maintenance in the U.S.

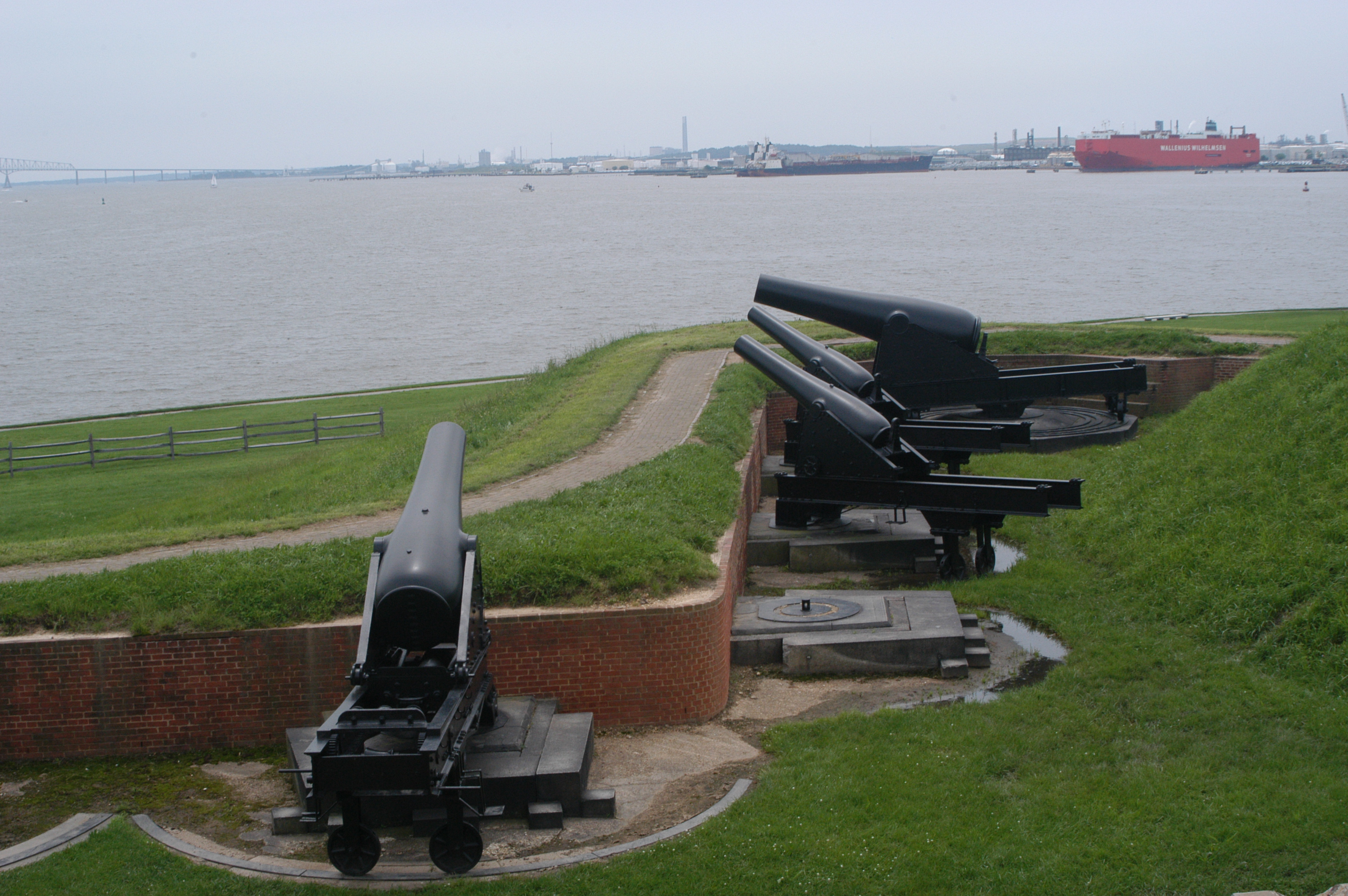
The outer works of Fort McHenry in Baltimore harbor, although built in the 1860s, are broadly similar to early First and Second System forts built before the War of 1812, with low earthworks, although mounting much larger cannon and reinforced with masonry. The cannon are 8-inch converted rifles (lined down from 10-inch Rodman guns) and a 15-inch Rodman gun, typical of the post-Civil War era.

The Statue of Liberty is built on top of Fort Wood of the Second System

Seacoast defense was a major concern for the United States from its independence through World War II. Before airplanes, many of America's enemies could only reach it from the sea, making coastal forts an economical alternative to standing armies or a large navy. Substantial fortifications were built at key locations, especially protecting major harbors. Seacoast defense also included submarine minefields, nets and booms, ships, and, later, airplanes. The U.S. Army Corps of Engineers played the central role in constructing fixed defenses, but all of the armed forces participated.

Designs evolved and became obsolete with changes in the technology available to both the attacking forces and the defenders. The evolution of the U.S. seacoast defense system is generally identified among several "systems", which are somewhat defined by the styles used, but more so by the events or trends which periodically stimulated new funding and construction. The division of the early forts into the First and Second Systems was made by later historians, and appears officially in an 1851 report by Chief Engineer Joseph Totten, probably the most prolific builder of masonry forts in American history.

After the 1940s, it was recognized that fixed fortifications were obsolete and ineffective against aircraft and missiles.

== Early defenses ==
At the beginning of the American Revolutionary War, many coastal fortifications already protected the Atlantic coast. Before independence from Britain, the colonies bore cost and responsibilities for their own protection. Urgency would wax and wane based on the political climate in Europe. Most defenses were artillery protected by earthworks, as protection from pirate raids and foreign incursions. In the American colonies and the United States, coastal forts were generally more heavily constructed than inland forts, and mounted heavier weapons comparable to those on potential attacking ships. Though seldom used, the forts were a deterrent. During the Revolution, additional forts were built by both sides, usually to meet specific threats. Those built by Patriot forces were called Patriot batteries.

=== First System ===
When the United States gained independence in 1783, the seacoast defense fortifications were in poor condition. Concerned by the outbreak of war in Europe in 1793, the Congress created a combined unit of "Artillerists and Engineers" to design, build, and garrison forts in 1794, appointed a committee to study coast defense needs, and appropriated money to construct a number of fortifications that would become known as the First System.

Twenty significant forts at 13 harbors were approved for construction, mostly with traditional low-walled structures with low sloped earthworks protecting wood or brick walls. The conventional wisdom was that soft earth would cushion the effect of cannon fire against the walls, and that low walls presented less exposure to projectiles. Walls were laid out at angles to each other to form a system of bastions, resembling a star layout, so that enemy forces could not mass against the bottom of a wall beneath the vertical field of fire from the wall; defenders on any wall could see and fire on the base of the adjacent walls. The angled walls also reduced the chance for more destructive straight-on hits from cannonballs. Most First System forts were relatively small, and with some exceptions mounted only one tier of cannon, on the roof of the fort. Additional "water batteries" (located near the waters the forts protected) outside the forts provided more firepower. Four of the First System forts were rebuilds of colonial forts, Fort Constitution in Portsmouth, New Hampshire, Fort Independence in Boston, Massachusetts, Fort Wolcott in Newport, Rhode Island, and Fort Mifflin in Philadelphia.

Lacking trained engineers to supervise the work, Secretary of War Henry Knox hired a number of European engineers. Although some fine forts were constructed, for the most part enthusiasm and funding waned and little work was completed. Most of the partially finished earthworks and wooden structures deteriorated before they were needed to defend against the British in 1812.

=== Second System ===
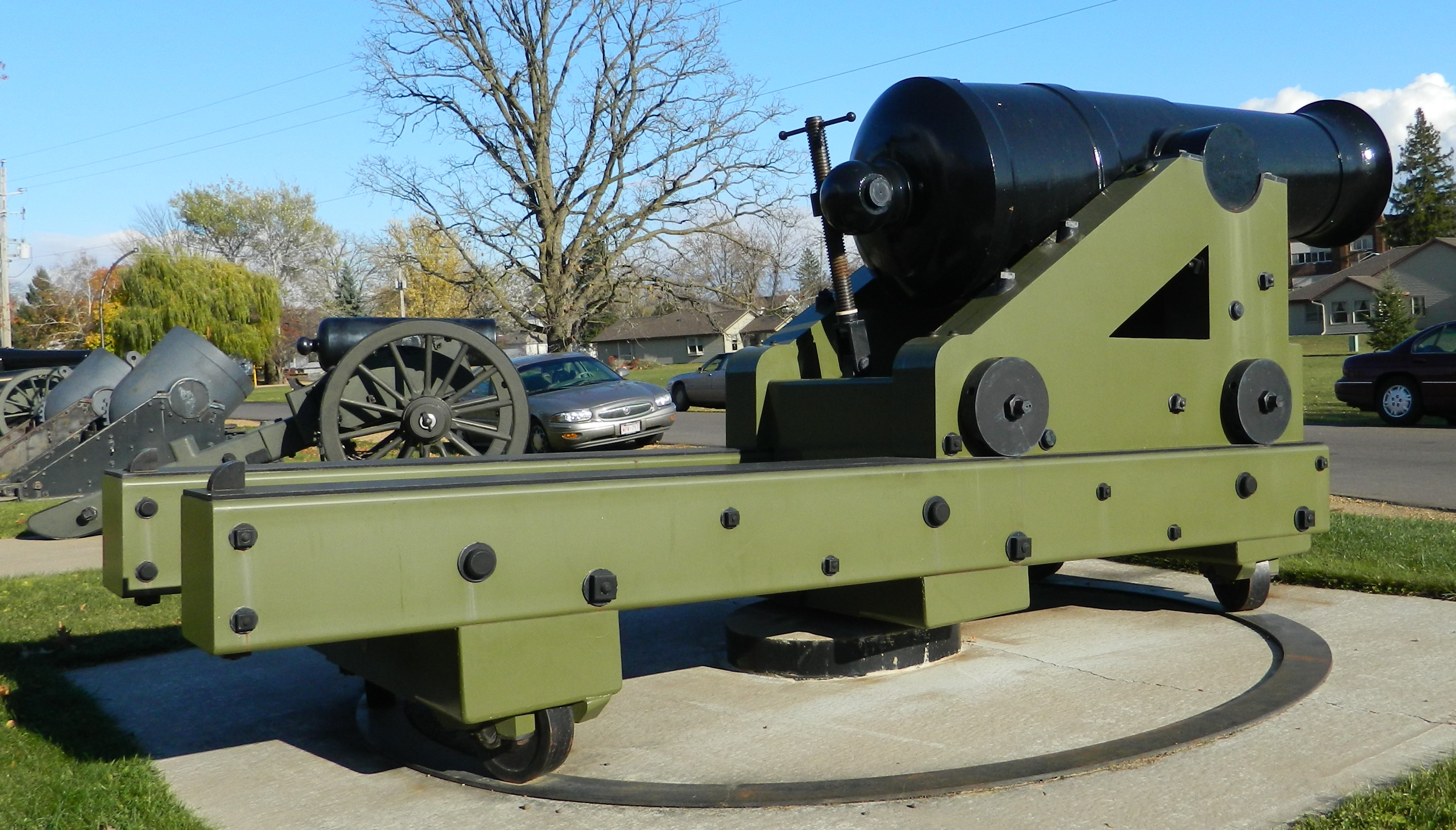
50-pounder Model 1811 Columbiad (7.25-inch or 184 mm bore) and center-pivot mounting designed by George Bomford as an experimental coastal defense gun. This gun was built in 1811 as a component of the Second System. Photographed in Clear Lake, Wisconsin.

In 1802, Congress separated the artillerists and engineers into separate corps and directed the Corps of Engineers to create a military academy at West Point, New York. One of the driving forces for establishing the new academy was the need to divorce the United States from its reliance on foreign engineers. In 1807–8, new concerns over a possible war with Great Britain prompted President Thomas Jefferson to renew fortification programs; this has come to be known as the Second System. One event that foreshadowed war was the Chesapeake–Leopard affair.

One common weakness among the typical low-walled open bastion or star forts was exposure to enemy fire, especially to new devices designed to explode in mid air and rain shrapnel down on the gunners. Gun emplacements which were at an angle to the sea were vulnerable to a solid shot running parallel to the wall taking out a row of guns and gunners with one enfilading shot. In the late 1770s, a French engineer, the Marquis de Montalembert, advocated a major change in the design of fortresses to address these problems. His design protected a fort's gunners by placing most of them in covered casemate walls with openings for the guns. By stacking rows of casemates in high walls more guns could be mounted along shorter walls. This was particularly important for seacoast fortifications, which had only a limited time in which to fire at passing enemy ships. To build these tall forts, walls had to be built of masonry, but be very thick to withstand the pounding of cannon fire. Despite the goal of building multi-tiered forts, only a few of these were completed, notably Castle Williams in New York Harbor. Most completed Second System forts generally resembled First System forts, with a one-tier star fort supplemented by water batteries.

The Second System was distinguished from the First System by greater use of Montalembert's concepts and the replacement of foreign engineers by American ones, many of them recent graduates of the new United States Military Academy superintended by Major Jonathan Williams, who not only instructed the new engineers in new ideas of coastal defense, but also designed and constructed a prototype, Castle Williams on Governors Island in New York Harbor.

Again, several fine forts were produced, but generally projects went unfinished, and between the First System and Second System little was prepared to resist the British in the coming War of 1812. However, no First System or Second System fortress was captured by the British. The British succeeded in entering Chesapeake Bay by capturing a fort on Craney Island near Norfolk and bypassing the area's two other forts. The invasion of Baltimore was prevented by Fort McHenry and supporting forts and troops. These included shoreline batteries at Forts Babcock and Covington to the west, Fort Look-Out (or the Six-Gun Battery) on the peninsula to the rear in the west, a temporary naval battery across the Patapsco channel to the east at Lazaretto Point, and sunken ships blocking the channels on either side of Fort McHenry, along with 20,000 militia dug in on the east side of the town at "Loudenschlager's Hill" (later "Hampstead Hill" in today's Patterson Park). The intense all-night bombardment of Fort McHenry by the British ships offshore was memorialized by Francis Scott Key, a Baltimore lawyer who witnessed the ferocious attack from one of the vessels, and put down his thoughts watching the barrage—which failed to either destroy the fort or subdue its defenders—in a four-stanza poem, which became known as "The Star-Spangled Banner" and later became America's national anthem. In some cases even incomplete forts (some with fake wooden cannon barrels painted black pointed out the embrasures) were sufficient to deter attack from the sea. But, undefended and unfortified, Washington, D.C., the national capital, was burned after the land militia forces were routed at the Battle of Bladensburg northeast of the capital in Prince George's County, Maryland. Washington had one fort, which the British bypassed, Fort Washington on the Potomac River just below Alexandria, Virginia, whose commander ordered the magazine blown when the passing British fleet appeared nearby, after the British had already occupied Washington. The present Fort Washington was built on the site of the destroyed Fort Washington in the early 1820s as part of the Third System. Among the many important and historic documents lost in the British burning of the Library of Congress were the plans to the first Fort Washington (begun as Fort Warburton) and other Second System forts.

=== Third System ===
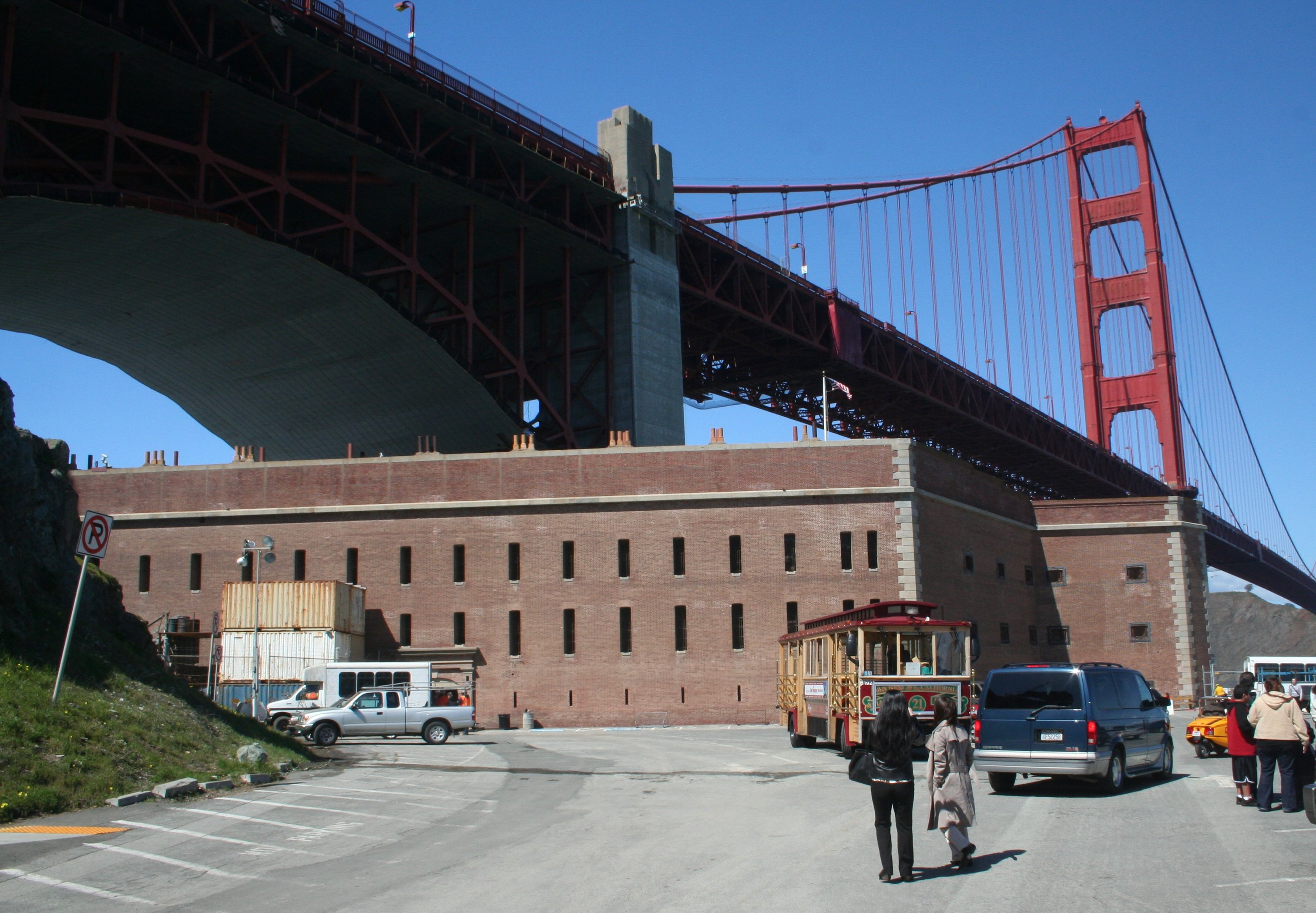
Fort Point – San Francisco – example of a mid-1800s Third System fort

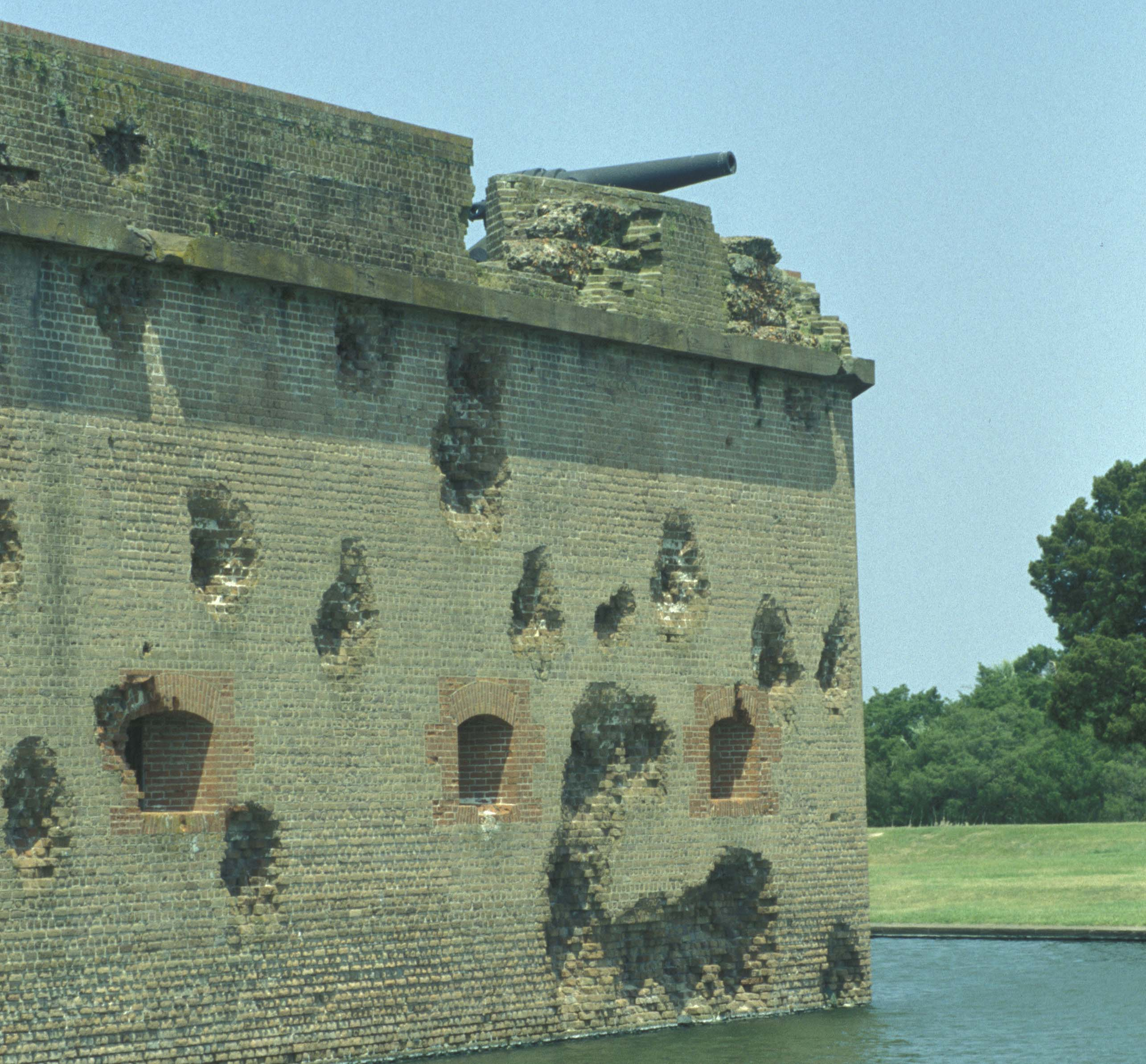
Damaged wall – Fort Pulaski on the coast of Georgia

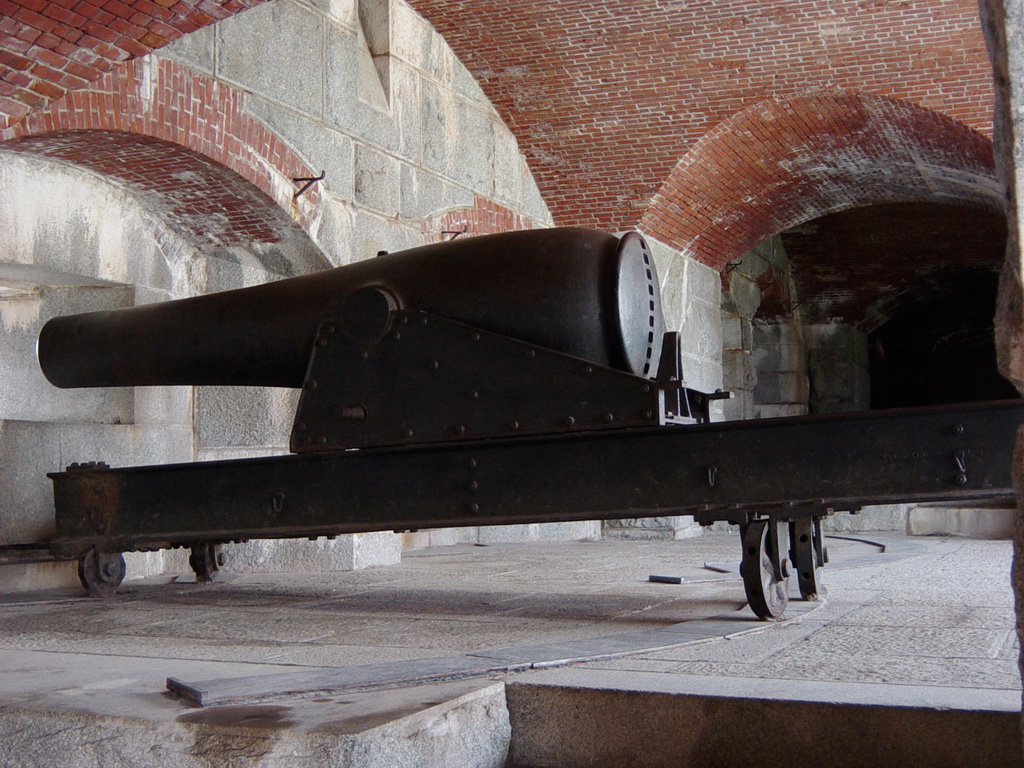
Civil War 10-inch Rodman gun at Fort Knox (Maine)

In 1816, following the War of 1812, Congress appropriated over $800,000 for an ambitious seacoast defensive system which was known as the Third System. A Board of Engineers for Fortifications, appointed by President James Madison, visited potential sites and prepared plans for the new forts. The Board's original 1821 report established the policy which would remain in place for most of the 19th century. The original report suggested 50 sites, but by 1850 the board had identified nearly 200 sites for fortification. The Army built forts at 42 of these sites, with several additional sites containing towers or batteries.

The forts were originally intended to mount mostly 42-pounder (7-inch or 178 mm) seacoast guns; however, due to a shortage of these weapons many 32-pounder (6.4-inch or 163 mm) seacoast guns and 8-inch (203 mm) and 10-inch (254 mm) columbiads were mounted instead.

The main defensive works were often large structures, based on combining the Montalembert concept, with many guns concentrated in tall, thick masonry walls, and the Vauban concept, with layers of low, protected-masonry walls. Most Third System forts had at least two tiers of cannon; the First and Second System forts often had only one tier. Construction was generally overseen by officers of the Army's Corps of Engineers. Smaller works guarded less significant harbors. U.S. Army engineer officer Joseph Totten and former French engineer officer Simon Bernard (commissioned a brevet brigadier general in the U.S. Army) designed the larger forts and key features of most of the smaller forts, such as the Totten casemate, which allowed a good field of fire with a minimal embrasure size.

By the end of the Third System in 1867, 42 forts covered the major harbors along the coastline. While most of the forts were completed, several of the forts—mostly in New England—were still under construction. A few of these forts, such as Fort Preble, Fort Totten, and Fort Constitution, were readied for armament even though they were far from complete.

The Corps of Engineers listed the forts from northeast to southwest, then to the Pacific Coast. The same order is used here for the new-construction forts of the Third System:

- Penobscot River, Maine: Fort Knox;
- Kennebec River, Maine: Fort Popham;
- Portland Harbor, Maine: Fort Gorges, Fort Scammell, Fort Preble;
- Kittery Point, Maine: Fort McClary;
- Portsmouth, New Hampshire: Fort Constitution;
- Boston Harbor, Massachusetts: Fort Warren, Fort Independence;
- New Bedford, Massachusetts: Fort at Clark's Point (later Fort Rodman);
- Newport, Rhode Island: Fort Adams;
- New London, Connecticut: Fort Trumbull;
- New York City: Fort Schuyler, Fort at Willets Point (later Fort Totten), Fort Tompkins, Fort Richmond, Fort Hamilton, Fort on Sandy Hook, New Jersey (later Fort Hancock);
- Pea Patch Island, Delaware: Fort Delaware;
- Baltimore Harbor, Maryland: Fort Carroll;
- (Washington, D.C.) Maryland: Fort Washington;
- Norfolk, Virginia: Fort Monroe, Fort Calhoun (later Fort Wool);
- Beaufort, North Carolina: Fort Macon;
- Wilmington, North Carolina: Fort Caswell;
- Charleston, South Carolina: Fort Sumter;
- Savannah, Georgia: Fort Pulaski;
- St. Marys River, Florida: Fort Clinch;
- Key West, Florida: Fort Taylor;
- Dry Tortugas, Florida: Fort Jefferson;
- Pensacola Bay, Florida: Fort Pickens, Fort Barrancas, Advanced Redoubt, Fort McRee;
- Mobile Bay, Alabama: Fort Morgan, Fort Gaines;
- New Orleans, Louisiana: Fort Massachusetts, Fort Pike, Fort Wood (later Fort Macomb), Fort Jackson, Fort St. Philip, Fort Livingston;
- San Francisco Bay, California: Fort Point, Fort Alcatraz.

In addition, several towers and batteries were constructed in support of the forts or at lesser harbors. First and Second System forts were renovated during the system as well, and readied for the larger cannon prevalent during that period.

== Civil War ==
Again, changes in technology affected design; the higher velocity ordnance of new rifled cannons crushed and penetrated the masonry walls of Third System forts. Severe damage was inflicted to forts on the Atlantic Coast during the Civil War. For example, Fort Sumter in South Carolina was bombarded into surrender by Confederate batteries in 1861, and reduced to rubble during Union efforts towards its recapture. In 1862 Fort Pulaski in Georgia was forced to surrender after only 30 hours of bombardment with rifled cannon, primarily large-caliber Parrott rifles.

Many of the larger smoothbore cannon (32-pounder and up) were rifled and equipped with breech bands to support larger powder charges and extend their effective range during the Civil War. This process is referred to as "banded and rifled".

During the Civil War, naval officers learned that their steamships and ironclad vessels could run past Confederate-held Third System forts with acceptable losses, such as at Mobile Bay.

The urgencies of war required that new forts or improvements be constructed quickly and at low cost. Partially completed Third System forts were finished, but new construction was mostly wood-revetted earthworks. Frequently earthworks were built near a Third System fort to supplement its firepower, but often they were stand-alone fortifications. In some cases, cannon from masonry forts were dispersed to earthen bunkers where they were better protected. The fortification of San Francisco Bay is a good example, where the typical Third System Fort Point at the mouth of the bay was effectively replaced by dispersed earthworks and low-walled fortifications nearby on Alcatraz Island, Angel Island, the Marin Headlands, and Fort Mason. Following the war, work on masonry forts ended in 1867, leaving several incomplete.

=== Minefields ===
Robert Fulton used the term "torpedo" to describe an underwater explosive device in 1805. Samuel Colt experimented with electrical firing of the torpedo. During the Civil War, these underwater mines became an important supplementary defense measure. The Confederacy, without a large navy to protect its harbors, relied on mines extensively to deter attacks by Union ships. Electrically fired torpedoes, later termed mines, controlled from mine casemates ashore were developed during and after the Civil War as part of coastal defenses.

=== Coast artillery weapons during the Civil War ===
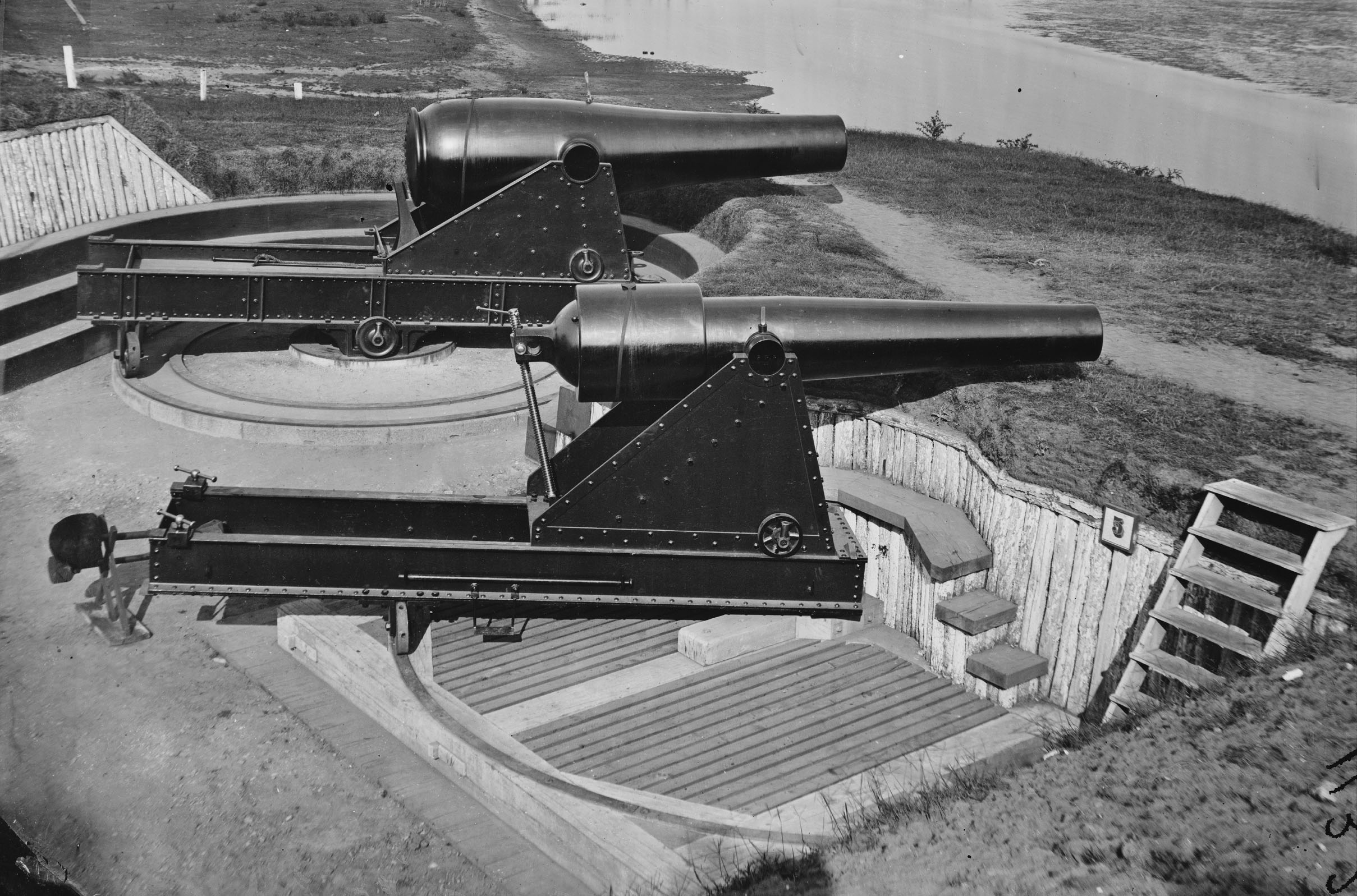
Two of the Civil War's heavy weapons: an 8-inch (200-pdr) Parrott rifle (front) and a 15-inch Rodman gun (rear) at Battery Rodgers, Alexandria, Virginia.

Numerous types of seacoast artillery were used in the Civil War. Except for the 20-inch Rodmans, of which only three Army weapons were built, the following list includes only widely deployed weapons. See Siege artillery in the American Civil War for more information.

- Smoothbore weapons:
- 32-pounder (6.4-inch or 163 mm) and 42-pounder (7-inch or 178 mm) seacoast guns
- 8-inch (203 mm) and 10-inch (254 mm) columbiads
- 8-inch, 10-inch, 15-inch (381 mm) and 20-inch (508 mm) Rodman guns (a type of columbiad)
- Rifled weapons:
- Rifled and sometimes banded variants of smoothbore guns ranging from 24-pounder (5.82-inch) to 10-inch caliber; one Union rifling system was called the James rifle
- 6.4-inch (100-pdr), 8-inch (200-pdr), and 10-inch (300-pdr) Parrott rifles
- 6.4-inch and 7-inch (178 mm) Brooke rifles (Confederate made)

== Post Civil War to the creation of the Coast Artillery Corps ==
After the war, construction for several new Third System forts began in New England. These were to be built of stone rather than brick, and designed to accommodate the large-bore cannon developed during the war. However, in 1867 money for masonry fortifications was cut off, and the Third System came to a close.

The vulnerability of masonry to rifled cannon and large-caliber smoothbore cannon and fewer concerns for invasion led to the construction of well-dispersed masonry-revetted earthen fortifications with brick-lined magazines, often located near Third System forts. These were typically armed with 15-inch Rodman guns and 8-inch converted rifles; in some cases, the forts were also rearmed with these weapons. All of the larger Parrott rifles had burst frequently during the war, so few of these were retained in service after the war. Also during the 1870s, a number of new projects were started to include large caliber mortars and submarine mines. However, the facilities for the mortars and mines were never completed, and funding for the new fortifications was cut off by 1878, leaving much of the program unfinished. By the 1880s most of the earthen fortifications were in disrepair.

=== Monitors for coast defense ===
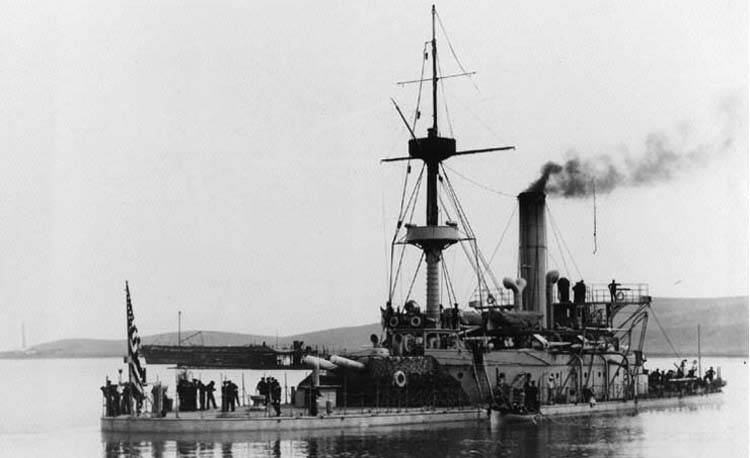
USS Monterey, a late-19th-century U.S. Navy monitor-style coastal defense ship.

Though coastal defense was generally within the purview of the U.S. Army, the U.S. Navy became more involved in the late 19th century with coastal defense ships, generally called monitors. These monitors were turreted ironclad warships (inspired and named by the famous precedent-setting USS Monitor ironclad warship of the Battle of Hampton Roads harbor in Virginia of March 1862, during the Civil War), as well as a future type of class for coastal warfare ships which closely followed her design by Swedish inventor John Ericsson (1803–1889), the term "monitor" also encompassed more flexible breastwork monitors which had a modest armored superstructure and were thus more seaworthy. These also featured modern rifled breech-loading guns.

These post-1862 monitor-style ships of steel and iron were used extensively in offensive roles during the Civil War, but were impractical for open-ocean service and offensive action abroad. They were, however, ideally suited for coastal and harbor defense with their shallow draft and large guns. Postwar, Civil War-era monitors were dispersed to important major American harbors, including San Francisco on the west coast. From the 1870s to the 1890s, larger and more powerful breastwork monitors were produced, such as the Amphitrite class, while the ocean-going navy was slow to make the transition to steel hulls and armor plating. An improvement on the monitor concept was the coastal battleship, such as the Indiana class of the 1890s.

As a result of the Spanish–American War and the subsequent acquisition of territories of Hawaii and its chain of islands in the central Pacific Ocean and the Philippines islands in the far western Pacific, off the coast of Asia in 1898. By the following early 1900s, the expanded American Navy under 26th President Theodore Roosevelt (1858–1919, served 1901–1909), was committed to a Blue-water navy fleet of ocean-going steel battleships and cruisers and ceased building monitors; however, some of the older vessels remained in naval service up to World War I in combat-prepared roles, and as training or auxiliary vessels thereafter.

=== Coast artillery weapons between the Civil War and Endicott period ===
The Endicott Program was largely implemented 1895–1905. As Endicott facilities were constructed in each harbor defense area, the previous coastal defenses were usually abandoned. Only widely deployed weapons are listed. The larger Parrott rifles had shown a tendency to burst during the war, so only a few were retained in service after the war, in emplacements that took advantage of their long range.

- 10-inch (254 mm) and 15-inch (381 mm) Rodman smoothbore guns
- 8-inch (203 mm) Rodman converted rifles (converted from 10-inch Rodman guns)

=== Endicott period ===
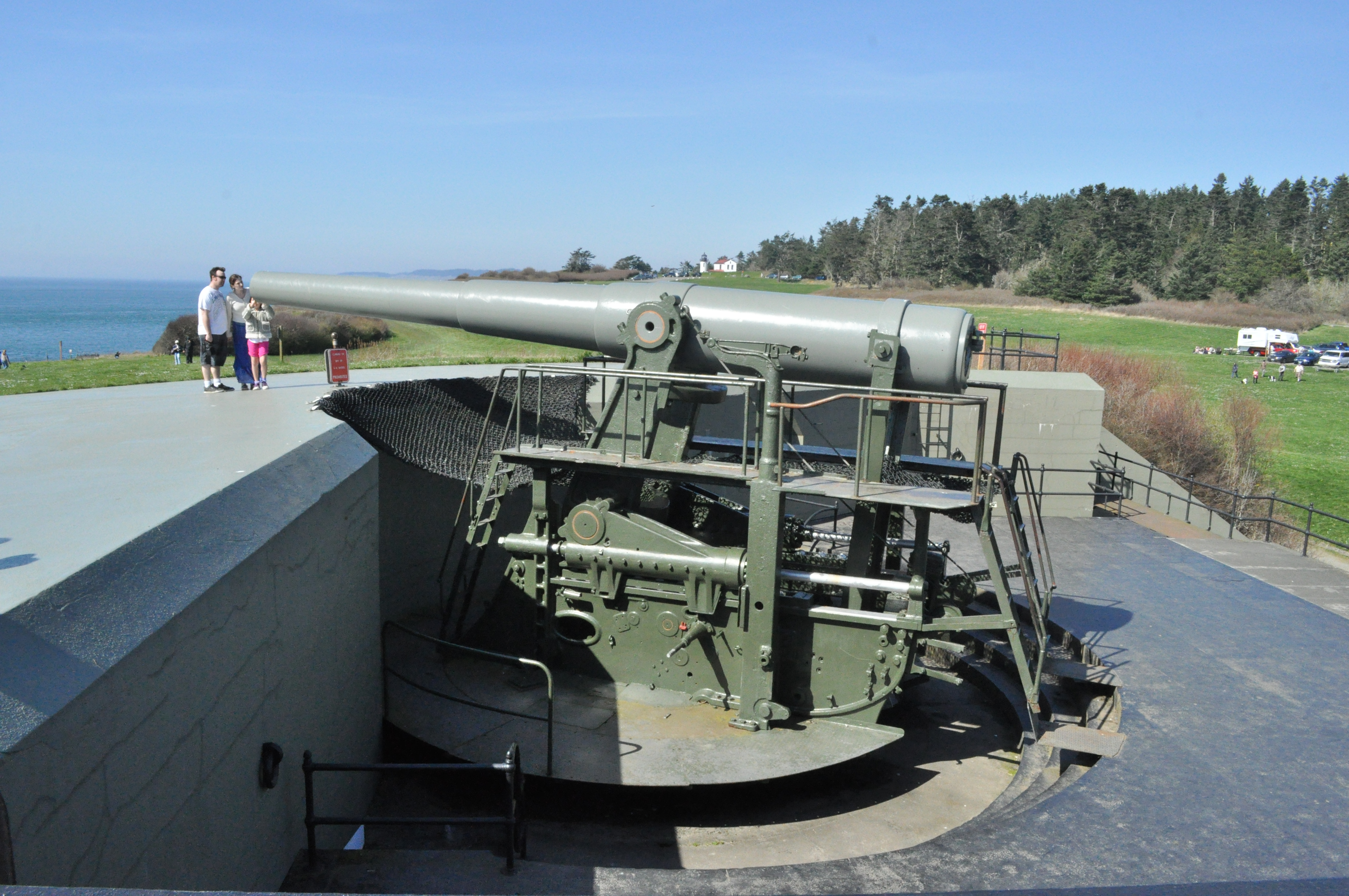
10-inch disappearing gun installation, Fort Casey, Washington state.

As early as 1882, the need for heavy fixed artillery for then modern seacoast defense was noted in 21st President Chester A. Arthur's Second Annual Message to the Congress (later known as the State of the Union address, after 1913), as follows:

I call your attention to the recommendation of the Secretary and the board that authority be given to construct two more cruisers of smaller dimensions and one fleet dispatch vessel, and that appropriations be made for high-power rifled cannon for the torpedo service and for other harbor defenses.

Prior efforts at harbor defense construction had ceased in the 1870s. Since that time, the design and construction of heavy ordnance in Europe had advanced rapidly, including the development of superior breech-loading and longer-ranged cannon, making U.S. harbor defenses obsolete. In 1883, the United States Navy began a new construction program and class of steel-hulled, steam-powered propeller warships with rotating gun turrets with an emphasis on offensive rather than defensive vessels. These factors combined to create a need for improved coastal defense systems.

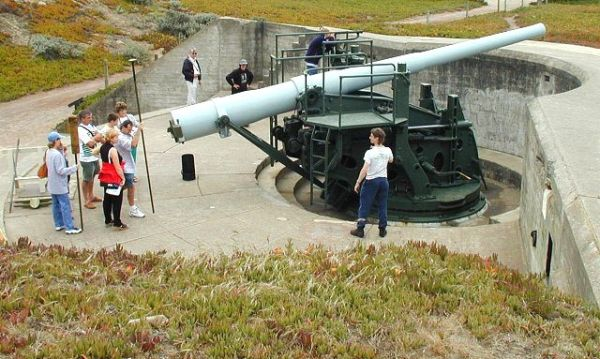
Typical Endicott period 6-inch (152 mm) disappearing rifle at Battery Chamberlin in San Francisco

In 1885, 22nd (& 24th) President Grover Cleveland (1837–1908, served 1885–1889 / 1893–1897), in his first term appointed a joint Army, Navy, and civilian board, headed by his U.S. Secretary of War William Crowninshield Endicott, (1826–1900, served 1885–1889), known as the Board of Fortifications. The findings of the board illustrated a grim picture of existing defenses in its 1886 report and recommended a massive $127 million construction program of breech-loading cannons with rifled / grooved barrels for firing pointed shells (rather than old-fashioned cannon balls), mortars, floating batteries, and submarine mines for some 29 locations on the U.S. coastlines (East, South and West). Most of the new Board's recommendations were adopted by the President, the Congress and the two military executive departments. This led to a large-scale modernization program of harbor and coastal defenses in the United States, especially the construction of modern steel bar-reinforced concrete fortifications of more formidable defenses and the installation of large caliber breech-loading artillery and mortar batteries. Typically, Endicott period projects were not fortresses, but a system of well-dispersed emplacements with a few large guns in each location. The structures were usually open-topped concrete walls protected by earthworks berms and embedded in their deep trench sloping walls. Many of these featured disappearing guns, which sat protected behind the walls, but could be raised to fire. With a few exceptions early in the program, These Endicott-style forts had no significant defenses against an amphibious land attack. Controlled mine fields were a critical component of the defense, and smaller guns were also employed to protect the mine fields from enemy naval minesweeping vessels. An extensive Coast Artillery fire control system was developed and provided for the forts of each Artillery District. Most of the Endicott fortifications were constructed from 1895 through 1905. As the defenses were constructed, each harbor or river's installations were controlled by Artillery Districts, renamed Coast Defense Commands in 1913 and Harbor Defense Commands in 1925.

By the outbreak of the Spanish–American War in April 1898, the Endicott Program had completed only a few batteries at each harbor. Following the infamous and tragic explosion and sinking of the new battleship USS Maine on 15 February, an Act of Congress a month later of 9 March 1898 authorized the construction of batteries that could be rapidly armed at numerous East Coast locations. It was feared that the Spanish fleet would bombard US ports. Completion of Endicott batteries and refurbishment or redeployment of 1870s batteries were also included. The 1870s-type batteries were armed with Civil War-era Rodman guns and Parrott rifles, along with some new weapons: 21 8-inch M1888 guns (slated for incomplete Endicott forts) on modified 1870s Rodman gun carriages. New batteries were also begun for eight 6-inch Armstrong guns and 34 4.72-inch Armstrong guns, purchased from the United Kingdom to provide some modern quick-firing medium-caliber guns, as none of the Endicott Program's 6-inch or 3-inch batteries had been completed. Field artillery, primarily 5-inch siege guns and 7-inch siege howitzers, was also deployed, mostly in the southeastern states of Georgia and Florida. Many of these batteries were not completed until 1899, after the war was over, and the 8-inch guns were withdrawn within a few years as modern emplacements for them were completed.

=== 1901 reorganization ===
Army leaders realized that heavy fixed artillery required different training programs and tactics than mobile field artillery. Prior to 1901 each of the seven artillery regiments contained both heavy and light artillery batteries. In February 1901, with the Endicott program well under way, the Artillery Corps was divided into two types: field artillery and coast artillery. The previous seven artillery regiments were dissolved, and 30 numbered companies of field artillery (commonly called batteries) and 126 numbered companies of coast artillery (CA) were authorized. 82 existing heavy artillery batteries were designated as coast artillery companies, and 44 new CA companies were created by splitting existing units and filling their ranks with recruits. The company-based organization was for flexibility, as each harbor defense command was differently equipped and a task-based organization was needed. The Coast Artillery would alternate between small unit and regimental organization several times over its history. The head of the Artillery Corps became the Chief of Artillery in the rank of brigadier general with jurisdiction over both types of artillery.

==== Mine planters ====
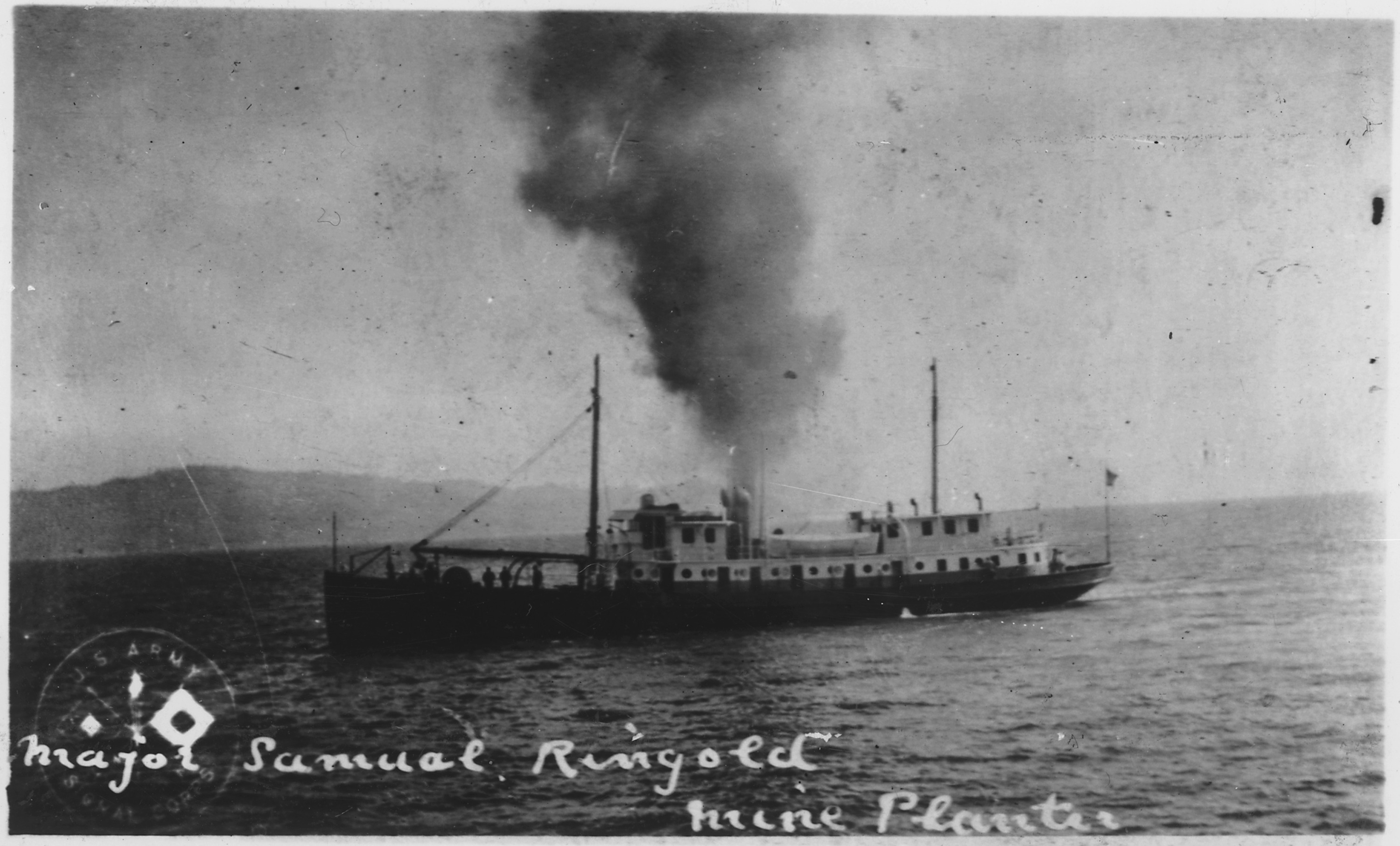
USAMP Major Samuel Ringgold, built 1904, which planted practice groups of mines in the Columbia River during the 1920s. (National Archives and Records Administration)

Circa 1901 the Coast Artillery took responsibility for the installation and operation of the controlled mine fields from the Corps of Engineers; these were planted to be under observation, remotely detonated electrically, and protected by fixed guns. With that responsibility the Coast Artillery began to acquire the vessels required to plant and maintain the mine fields and cables connecting the mines to the mine casemate ashore, organized as a "Submarine Mine Battery" within the Coast Defense Command. The larger vessels, called "mine planters", were civilian crewed until the creation of the U.S. Army Mine Planter Service (AMPS) and Warrant Officer Corps to provide officers and engineers for these vessels in 1918. The mine component was considered to be among the principal armament of coastal defense works. When the Coast Artillery Corps was disestablished and the artillery branches merged in 1950, some of the mine planter vessels were transferred to the U.S. Navy and redesignated as Auxiliary Minelayers (ACM/MMA).

=== Coast artillery weapons of the Endicott period ===
These weapons were emplaced between 1895 and 1905. Only widely deployed weapons are listed. Most except the mortars, 3-inch guns, and some 6-inch guns were on disappearing carriages, with barbette carriages (also called pedestal carriages) used for the remainder. Although some harbor defenses in less-threatened locations were disarmed following World War I (some of these retained minefields), many of these weapons remained in service until superseded by 16-inch guns and scrapped during World War II.

- 12-inch gun M1888, M1895, M1900 (305 mm)
- 12-inch mortar M1886, M1890 (305 mm)
- 10-inch gun M1888, M1895, M1900 (254 mm)
- 8-inch gun M1888 (203 mm)
- 6-inch gun M1897, M1900, M1903 (152 mm)
- 5-inch gun M1897, M1900 (127 mm)
- 3-inch gun M1898, M1902, M1903 (76 mm)

== Taft Board and creation of the Coast Artillery Corps ==
In 1905, after the experiences of the Spanish–American War, President Theodore Roosevelt appointed a new fortifications board, under Secretary of War William Howard Taft. They updated some standards and reviewed the progress on the Endicott Board's program. Most of the changes recommended by this board were technical; such as adding more searchlights, electrification (lighting, communications, and projectile handling), and more sophisticated optical aiming techniques. The board also recommended fortifications in territories acquired from Spain: Cuba and the Philippines, as well as Hawaii, and a few other sites. Defenses in Panama were authorized by the Spooner Act of 1902. The Taft Program fortifications differed slightly in battery construction and had fewer numbers of guns at a given location than those of the Endicott Program. Due to the rapid development of dreadnought battleships, a new 14-inch gun was introduced in a few locations and improved models of other weapons were also introduced. By the beginning of World War I, the United States had a coastal defense system that was equal to any other nation.

The rapidity of technological advances and changing techniques increasingly separated coastal defenses (heavy) from field artillery (light). Officers were rarely qualified to command both, requiring specialization. As a result, in 1907, Congress split Field Artillery and Coast Artillery into separate branches, creating a separate Coast Artillery Corps (CAC), and authorized an increase in the Coast Artillery Corps to 170 numbered companies. In 1907, the Artillery School at Fort Monroe became the Coast Artillery School, which operated until 1946, and in 1908, the Chief of Artillery became the Chief of Coast Artillery.

In an exercise in 1907 at Subic Bay, Philippines, a U.S. Marine battalion of the Advanced Base Force commanded by Major Eli K. Cole emplaced forty-four heavy guns for coast defense in a ten-week period, due to the Eight-eight fleet war scare with Japan. These guns were operated by the Marines until circa 1910, when the Coast Artillery Corps' modern defenses centered on Fort Wint on Grande Island were completed.

=== Fort Drum ===
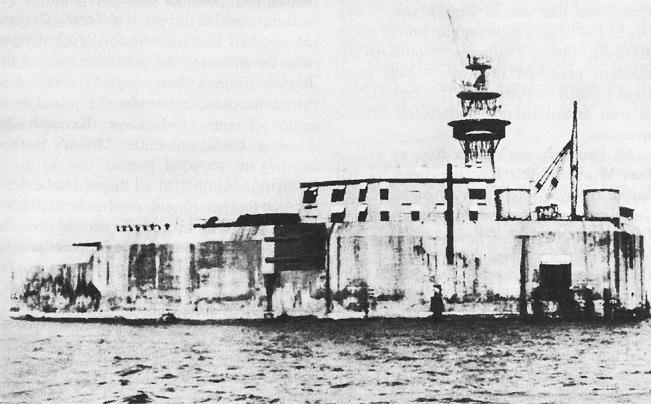
Fort Drum in Manila Bay, Philippines, was a result of the Taft board program

One of the most extreme fortresses of the early 20th century was Fort Drum in Manila Bay of the Philippines. Originally a barren rock island, it was leveled by U.S. Army engineers between 1910 and 1914 and then built up with thick layers of steel-reinforced concrete into a massive structure roughly resembling a concrete battleship. It was the only true sea fort of the Endicott and Taft programs. The fort was topped with a pair of armored steel gun turrets, each mounting two 14-inch (356 mm) M1909 guns; this model was specially designed for Fort Drum and was not deployed elsewhere. Four 6-inch (152 mm) M1908 guns on M1910 pedestal mounts in casemates were also equipped. Searchlights, anti-aircraft batteries, and a fire direction tower were also mounted on its upper surface. The 25-to-36-foot-thick (7.6 to 11.0 m) fortress walls protected extensive ammunition magazines, machine spaces, and living quarters for the 200-man garrison. The extensive level of fortification was not typical of the period, but driven by the exposed location. Although the design predated concerns about defense from air attack, the design proved to be exemplary for that purpose.

After the outbreak of war in the Pacific on 7 December 1941, Fort Drum withstood heavy Japanese air and land bombardment as it supported U.S. and Filipino defenders on Bataan and Corregidor until the very end on 6 May 1942. The fortress was among the last U.S. posts to hold out against the Japanese and did not surrender until ordered by superiors after Corregidor had been overrun, but not until the U.S. soldiers had sabotaged the guns and ordnance to prevent use by the Japanese. Ironically, even without the guns, the Japanese in Fort Drum were among the last holdouts when U.S. forces recaptured the Philippines in 1945.

=== Self-propelled torpedoes ===
Mines as we know them today were frequently referred to as torpedoes in the 19th and early 20th centuries. The self-propelled torpedo as we know it was derived from the concept of the mine, with early submarines and torpedo boats evolving as defensive weapons in the 1890s to deliver torpedoes against attacking fleets. During early development, it was not clear whether submarines and torpedo boats would be in the purview of the Army or the Navy, since the Army was responsible for the use and development of stationary minefields and other fixed coastal defenses. As the range and potential uses of submarines and torpedo boats grew, it became more apparent that these were naval vessels, and both surface- and submarine-delivered torpedoes were an important aspect of naval coastal defense strategies. However, self-propelled torpedoes were not included in the Army's coastal defenses. Shore-launched Whitehead compressed air driven torpedoes were the first deployed, in Europe.

== World War I ==
Submarines and airplanes became more important, with the former being a perceived if not actual threat to U.S. harbors. This concern caused an increase in the use of mines and nets, and demand for superior artillery. However, as the war progressed it became more clear that the enemies did not have the resources to bring the war across the Atlantic, and progress diminished along with concerns. Curiously, despite the rise of air power in World War I, it received little consideration in U.S. coast defense design until the late 1930s, probably due to the emergence of Japanese aircraft carriers as a threat. In response to the rapid improvements in dreadnought battleships, approximately 14 two-gun batteries of 12-inch guns on a new M1917 long-range barbette carriage began construction in 1917, but none were completed until 1920.

Due to their experience and training with large guns, the Coast Artillery operated all U.S. Army heavy artillery (155 mm gun and up) in World War I, primarily French- and British-made weapons. They also acquired the anti-aircraft mission in that war. A number of 5-inch and 6-inch guns were withdrawn from coast defenses and remounted on wheeled carriages for use on the Western Front, with about 72 6-inch (possibly including some Navy guns) and 26 5-inch guns shipped to France. However, due to the Armistice, none of the units equipped with repurposed coast defense guns completed training in time to see action. Only a few of the 6-inch guns and none of the 5-inch guns were returned to the coast defenses after the war. Most of the 6-inch guns were stored until remounted in World War II, and the 5-inch guns were declared obsolete and scrapped circa 1920.

=== Railway artillery ===
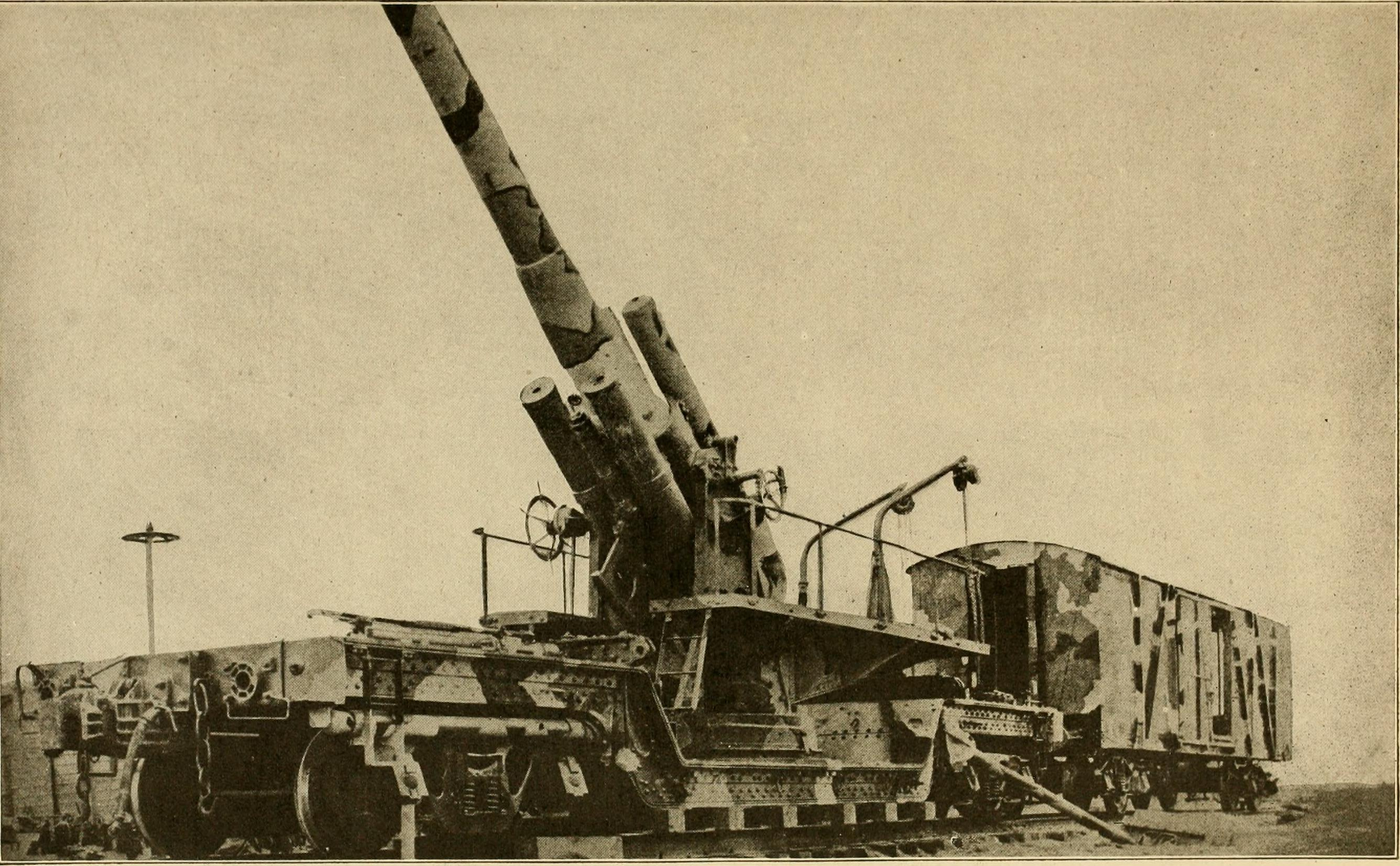
8-inch M1888 railway gun with ammunition wagon.

A large-scale program to mount 12-inch mortars along with 8-inch, 10-inch, and 12-inch guns and some other weapons as railway artillery was partially implemented during and shortly after World War I, with the weapons withdrawn from less-threatened forts and from spares. A general program to reduce mortars from four per pit to two per pit created a surplus of these weapons. The cramped pits created difficulties in reloading; a two-mortar pit had roughly the same rate of fire as a four-mortar pit. Despite a large-scale effort, of all these weapons only three 8-inch guns were delivered to France before the Armistice, due to shipping priorities. The mortars and 8-inch guns were on trainable mounts, thus were suitable for use as coast defense weapons; the other weapons were returned to the forts after the war. Sources indicated that up to 91 12-inch mortars and 47 8-inch guns were retained as railway coast defense weapons through World War II, with most of the 8-inch guns deployed and almost all of the mortars held in reserve. During World War I, the U.S. Navy implemented a more successful program that delivered five 14"/50 caliber railway guns to France in time to support the final Allied offensives. However, these weapons' mountings were not suitable for coast defense and they were retired after that war.

=== Coast artillery weapons of the Taft period and World War I ===
A new 14-inch (356 mm) gun and improved versions of some Endicott period weapons were introduced from 1905 to 1918, supplementing rather than replacing the previous weapons. The 14-inch guns were emplaced in the new harbor defenses of Los Angeles, Hawaii, the Panama Canal, and Manila Bay in the Philippines. A one-off 16-inch gun M1895 (406 mm) was also deployed on a disappearing carriage on the Pacific side of the Panama Canal in 1914; this was the first 16-inch gun in U.S. service. Only widely deployed seacoast weapons are included in this list.

- 14-inch gun M1907, M1910 (356 mm)
- 12-inch mortar M1908, M1912
- 6-inch gun M1905, M1908

== Between World War I and World War II ==
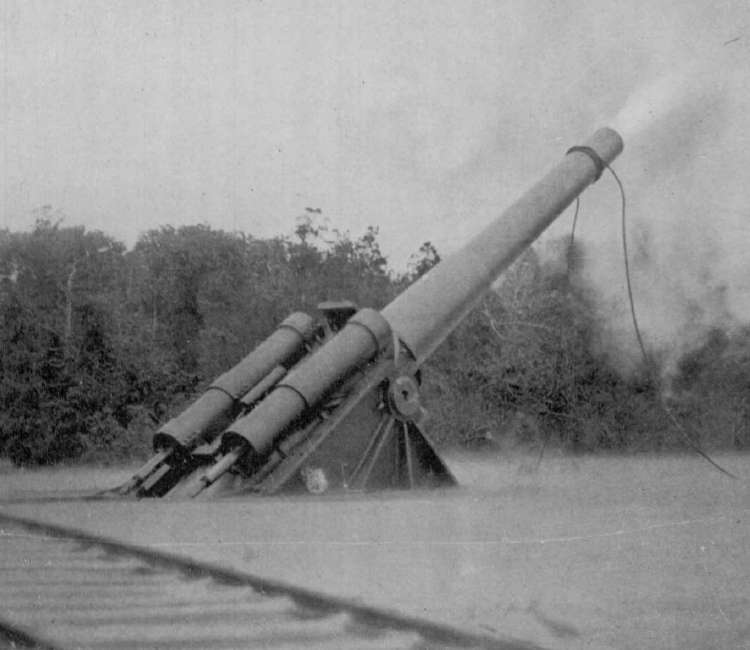
12-inch gun M1895 on long-range barbette carriage M1917.

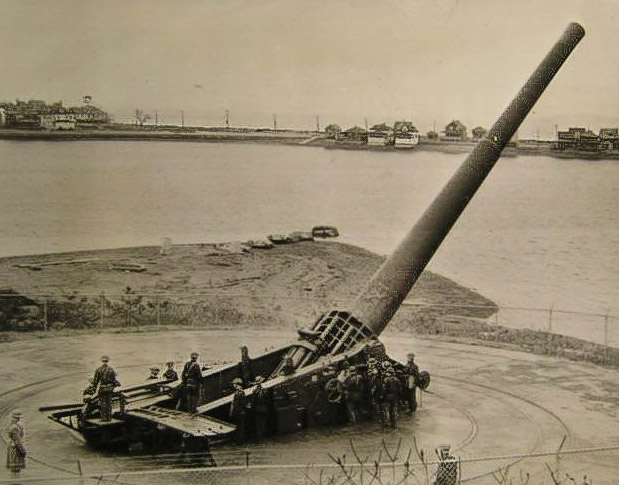
16-inch gun M1919 at Fort Duvall, Massachusetts, typical of pre-WWII 16-inch installations.

Airplanes were a minor but increasingly important factor in World War I, and the threat prompted changes to coastal defenses in the 1920s and 1930s. Demonstrations in the 1920s by U.S. Army General Billy Mitchell showed the vulnerability of warships to air attack; this illustrated the use of aircraft for seacoast defense against ships, but also the vulnerability of defenses against air power. In the isolationist United States, bombers were seen as more of a defense against naval attack than a strategic offensive weapon. However, planes like the Boeing B-17, which evolved as defensive weapons, turned out to have excellent offensive capacity as well.

=== Drawdown and reorganization ===
In the early 1920s several types of weapons, mostly those with only a few deployed, were withdrawn from Coast Artillery service. This was probably to simplify the supply situation. The only widely deployed type withdrawn was the 3-inch M1898 Driggs-Seabury gun with masking parapet (simplified disappearing) mounts, at least 111 of which had been emplaced. The disappearing function had already been disabled due to interfering with aiming the gun, and the weapon had an alarming tendency for the piston rod to break on firing. Others included 6-inch Armstrong guns (9 guns), all three types of 4.72-inch Armstrong guns (34 guns), 4-inch/40 caliber Navy Driggs-Schroeder guns (4 guns), and all models of 5-inch guns (52 guns). Twenty-six of the 5-inch guns had been sent to France for use on field carriages. Additionally, approximately 72 6-inch guns withdrawn from coast defenses for field service were not immediately remounted; these were eventually remounted on long-range carriages in new batteries during World War II. Except in a few cases, none of these weapons were directly replaced.

On 9 June 1925 the Coast Defense Commands were redesignated as Harbor Defense Commands via a War Department order. By the end of the 1920s, eight harbor defense commands in less-threatened areas were completely disarmed. These included the Kennebec River, ME, Baltimore, MD, Potomac River, MD and VA, Cape Fear River, NC, Savannah, GA, Tampa Bay, FL, Mobile, AL, and the Mississippi River, LA. It is possible the mine defenses were retained in reserve. Some of these commands were rearmed with "Panama mounts" for mobile artillery early in World War II.

In 1922, 274 Coast Artillery companies were authorized, 188 of which were active. During that year 44 companies were inactivated, but 14 new companies were created for the Philippine Scouts, and a 15th in 1923. The Philippine Scouts, units of mostly Filipino enlisted men and mostly U.S. officers, manned many of the coast defenses in the Philippines and served in other key roles. The General Staff reconfirmed a commitment to artillery and mines as the most practical and cost-effective methods for seacoast defense, as an alternative to a larger Navy or Air Corps. In 1924 the CAC adopted a regimental system, consolidating the companies into 16 Regular Army harbor defense regiments, two Philippine Scouts regiments (one harbor defense, one tractor-drawn), three Regular tractor-drawn regiments, and two Regular railway regiments. These were supplemented by 11 harbor defense and two tractor-drawn regiments of the National Guard, which trained in peacetime for activation in wartime. The total companies authorized remained the same, at 289 with 144 active. There was also a Coast Artillery Reserve of 14 harbor defense regiments, four railway regiments, three tractor-drawn regiments, and 42 anti-aircraft regiments in 8 AA brigades. However, many of the Reserve units had only a small number of personnel assigned, and many were demobilized without activation in 1933 and during World War II, or served in that war with different designations. From 1930 to 1932 the army drafted new defense projects for each harbor. In 1931 it established a Harbor Defense Board to supervise the execution of these projects.

=== New weapons ===
The rapid evolution of dreadnought battleships between 1905 and 1920 demonstrated the need for improved coast defenses, as most Endicott and Taft period weapons were on short-range mountings and were not large enough to reliably defeat battleship armor. Thirty existing 12-inch M1895 guns were mounted on new long-range M1917 barbette carriages in 16 batteries, including two one-gun batteries in the Philippines. Most of these batteries remained in service through the end of World War II. Other new weapons were deployed, but in limited quantities due to budget constraints. 14-inch M1920 railway guns were added to the harbor defenses of the Panama Canal and Los Angeles, two at each location. The future of U.S. coast defense was foreshadowed with the adoption of 16-inch (406 mm) guns, initially the 16-inch howitzer M1920 (25 calibers long) and 16-inch gun M1919 (50 calibers long). Based on the Coast Artillery's experience operating heavy weapons in World War I, especially the French-made 400 mm (15.75-inch) Modèle 1916 railway howitzer, new barbette carriages were designed with an elevation of 65 degrees to allow plunging fire as enemy ships approached. Four howitzers were deployed at Fort Story, Virginia and seven guns were deployed at four locations near Boston, Long Island, NY, Queens, NY, and Pearl Harbor, Hawaii. In 1922, the Washington Naval Treaty caused the U.S. Navy to cancel the South Dakota-class battleships and the Lexington-class battlecruiser, surplusing 16-inch/50 caliber Mark II and Mark III barrels. About 70 guns were completed before the treaty went into effect, and the Navy wished to retain most of them for use in future battleships. Initially only 20 guns were transferred to the Army, who built a new version of the M1919 mount for the naval guns. However, only ten of these guns were deployed until 1940, in Pearl Harbor, Panama, and San Francisco. They were known as the 16-inch Navy gun MkIIMI and MkIIIMI in Army service. The 16-inch guns, firing 2,340 lb (1,060 kg) projectiles up to 49,100 yd (44,900 m), were much more effective than any previous U.S. coast defense guns.

Another weapon sparsely deployed in the 1930s would become a bigger part of World War II coast defenses. 8-inch/45 caliber Mark VI naval guns from older battleships scrapped under the Washington Naval Treaty became available, but only six guns were deployed between 1933 and 1938, all in fixed mountings. Up to 32 guns were initially available from the secondary armament of New Jersey, Kansas, Minnesota, and New Hampshire, of the Virginia- and Connecticut-class battleships. They were known as the 8-inch Navy gun MkVIM3A2 in Army service, and a railway mounting was developed in 1941. The main armament of these ships, the 12"/45 caliber Mark 5 gun, was also made available to the Army, but these were never deployed by the United States and at least some were sold to Brazil.

Protection against air attack was slow to evolve. Existing batteries were camouflaged, but if detected, they remained vulnerable to air attack. The first batteries of heavy guns constructed after World War I were, somewhat inexplicably, completely open except for camouflage, but mounted long-range weapons set back from the coast out of direct observation from the sea. However, from the late 1930s (in most cases beginning in 1942) these batteries were mounted under thick concrete casemates covered with vegetation to make them virtually invisible from above and well protected against bombing. Significantly, the Washington Naval Treaty prohibited major improvements to defenses in the Pacific including the Philippines, so the two long-range 12-inch guns at Fort Mills on Corregidor were never casemated (paradoxically, this probably improved their usefulness against the Japanese invasion when it came, as they had large arcs of fire). Another result was that 12 240 mm howitzers being shipped to the Philippines were deployed in Hawaii instead. In anticipation of a conflict with Japan, most of the limited funds available between 1933 and 1938 were spent on the Pacific coast, especially as several Japanese aircraft carriers were operational by then. In 1939, the threat of war in Europe prompted larger appropriations and the resumption of work along the Atlantic coast.

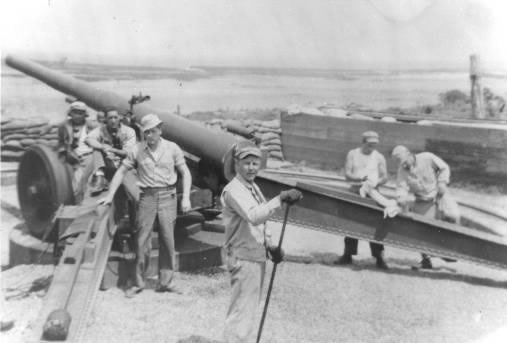
155mm gun M1918 on Panama Mount

A new weapon adopted by the U.S. during World War I introduced road and cross-country mobility to the Coast Artillery. The 155 mm gun M1918 (6.1 inch), closely derived from the French 155 mm GPF (Grand Puissance Filloux, or high-powered gun designed by Filloux), could be towed behind heavy Holt tractors and deployed to provide some protection for areas not part of existing harbor defenses. Each tractor-drawn regiment was authorized 24 of these weapons. Circular concrete platforms called "Panama mounts" were constructed in existing and new defenses to improve the utility of these weapons, particularly early in World War II.

In anticipation of war, additional mines, searchlights, radar, and anti-aircraft guns were installed in 1940 and 1941. However, due to a general shortage, installation of new anti-aircraft guns at harbor defenses was minimal. After the war began, the entire Western Defense Command was placed on high alert, but Japanese attacks, including two submarine deck gun attacks and explosive balloons, caused only minor damage.

Anti-submarine nets, naval mines, and controlled mines protected many harbor entrances. Radar and patrol planes could detect enemy vessels at long distances, and aircraft became the first line of defense against intruders.

A coast defense exercise conducted in the Harbor Defenses of Long Island Sound in 1930 was notable for including aircraft and submarines (from the nearby Submarine Base New London) in the defensive plan. Observation, bombardment, and pursuit (fighter) aircraft were included. The submarines had a dual reconnaissance and counter-attack mission; it was determined that these missions should be separated in future.

=== Coast artillery weapons between World War I and World War II ===
The majority of Endicott and Taft period weapons remained in service between the wars. U.S. coast artillery introduced between the wars included:

- 16-inch gun M1919 (406 mm)
- 16"/50 caliber Mark 2 gun (also Mark 3)
- 16-inch howitzer M1920
- 14-inch M1920 railway gun (356 mm)
- 12-inch gun M1895 on long-range M1917 barbette carriage (305 mm)
- 12-inch coast defense mortar (various models) on railway mounting
- 8-inch M1888 gun on railway mounting (203 mm)
- 8-inch Navy Mk.VI M3A2 gun (initially on fixed mountings)
- 155 mm gun M1918, a tractor-drawn French-designed weapon built for the U.S. Army (6.1 inch)

== World War II ==
The attack on Pearl Harbor demonstrated the obsolescence of coastal artillery that was not protected against air attack and the inadequacy of pre-war anti-aircraft defenses. However, perhaps if there was no coastal artillery surface raiders would have been bolder. Coastal defense emplacements in the Philippines (the only occasion since the Civil War on which U.S. coast defenses were heavily engaged) and Singapore were locally effective; however, the Japanese simply attacked where there were no defenses and then enveloped the fortifications. Heavily fortified positions such as Japanese Rabaul and Fort Drum in the Philippines demonstrated tactical success amongst strategic failures.

=== Fall of the Philippines ===
The Japanese invaded the Philippines shortly after Pearl Harbor, bringing the Harbor Defenses of Manila and Subic Bays into the war along with the other U.S. and Filipino forces in the archipelago. The Japanese initially landed in northern Luzon, far from the defenses of Manila Bay. Although the Coast Artillery did their best, their weapons were poorly positioned against the direction of enemy attacks and vulnerable to air and high-angle artillery attack. Eight 8-inch railway guns had been deployed to the Philippines in 1940, but six were destroyed by air attack while entrained in response to the initial landings, and the other two were placed in fixed mountings on Corregidor and Bataan, but lacked crews and ammunition. The 14-inch turret guns of Fort Drum and the 12-inch mortars of Battery Way and Battery Geary were probably the most effective coast defense weapons in the Battle of Corregidor, but all but two of the mortars were knocked out before the Japanese landed on the island. The U.S. forces surrendered on 6 May 1942, after destroying their weapons.

=== Modernization ===
The outbreak of war in Europe in September 1939 and the Fall of France in June 1940 greatly accelerated U.S. defense planning and funding. About this time a severe lack of design coordination resulted in the Iowa-class battleship being unable to use the Mark 2 and Mark 3 16-inch guns, and a new gun design was required for them. With war on the horizon, the Navy released the approximately 50 remaining guns, and on 27 July 1940 the Army's Harbor Defense Board recommended the construction of 27 (eventually 38) 16-inch two-gun batteries to protect strategic points along the U.S. coastline, to be casemated against air attack, as were almost all of the older batteries by this time.

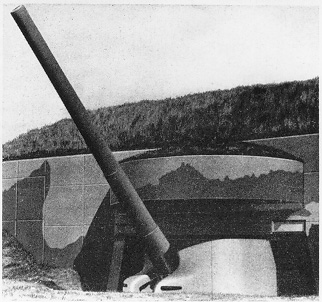
16-inch casemated gun.

6-inch gun M1905 on shielded barbette carriage at Fort Columbia State Park, Washington state, typical of World War II 6-inch batteries.

The 16-inch guns were only the top end of the World War II program, which eventually replaced almost all previous coast defense weapons with newer (or remounted) weapons. Most of the 12-inch long-range batteries were casemated and served through the end of the war. Generally, each Harbor Defense Command was to have two or three 16-inch or 12-inch long-range batteries, plus 6-inch guns on new mountings with protected magazines, and 90 mm Anti Motor Torpedo Boat (AMTB) guns, which were supplemented with 37 mm or 40 mm anti-aircraft guns. In addition to the proposed 38 new 16-inch (406 mm) batteries with a range of 25 mi (40 km), eleven new 8-inch (203 mm) batteries with a range of 20 mi (32 km) and 87 new 6-inch (152 mm) batteries on high-angle shielded mountings with a range of 15 mi (24 km) were projected. All of these batteries had two guns each with heavily protected magazines and plotting rooms and casemated guns (except the 6-inch guns had shielded mountings). Additionally, about 32 8-inch MkVIM3A2 railway guns were deployed. In most cases replacing existing harbor defenses, with wartime changes noted, fortifications were planned for the harbor defenses of:

East coast

- Portland, Maine
- Portsmouth, New Hampshire
- Boston, Massachusetts
- Cape Cod Canal (16-inch not built)
- New Bedford, Massachusetts (no additional heavy guns)
- Narragansett Bay
- New York City
  - Long Island Sound
  - Southern New York
- Delaware River
- Chesapeake Bay
- Charleston, South Carolina (16-inch not built)

Gulf coast

- Key West (no additional heavy guns)
- Pensacola, Florida (no additional heavy guns)
- Galveston, Texas (no additional heavy guns)

West coast

- San Diego, California
- Los Angeles, California
- San Francisco, California
- Columbia River (no additional heavy guns)
- Puget Sound (no additional heavy guns)
- Cape Flattery, Washington
- Dutch Harbor, Alaska (biggest guns were 8-inch)
- Kodiak, Alaska (biggest guns were 8-inch)
- Sitka, Alaska (no heavy guns)
- Seward, Alaska (no heavy guns)

Other U.S. possessions or overseas

- Honolulu
- Pearl Harbor
- Kaneohe Bay
- North Shore of Oahu (biggest guns were 8-inch and 240 mm howitzers)
- Balboa, Canal Zone (no additional heavy guns)
- Cristóbal, Colón (16-inch not built)
- San Juan, Puerto Rico
- Roosevelt Roads Naval Station (biggest guns were 8-inch)
- Trinidad (no heavy guns built)
- Jamaica (not built)
- Bermuda (biggest guns were 8-inch)
- Argentia, Newfoundland (no heavy guns)

With CONUS and the Caribbean less threatened as the war progressed, about 21 16-inch gun batteries were completed in 1941–44, but not all of these were armed. Three new 12-inch long-range batteries and five 8-inch batteries (mostly in Alaska) were completed and armed, and about 65 6-inch batteries were completed, but only about 45 of these were armed. Some batteries on Oahu were completed with two 14-inch triple turrets from the sunken Arizona and eight 8-inch twin turrets removed from Lexington and Saratoga rather than the designed guns. As the areas of combat became more distant from the U.S. and as naval threats were essentially removed, defending harbors against ships became a low priority, and as the new coast defense batteries were completed, almost all of the older seacoast guns were scrapped to become new weapons. Many soldiers of the Coast Artillery were transferred to field artillery, anti-aircraft, or even infantry duties. When the war ended, it was soon decided that seacoast defense guns were no longer needed, and missiles would eventually fill the role. By 1947, most guns remaining in the seacoast defenses were declared surplus and scrapped, and the last weapons were removed in 1950 when the Coast Artillery was deactivated.

=== Other coast defense operations ===
Two related aspects of seacoast defense in the early part of the war were coastal beach patrols in the continental United States (CONUS) and the maintenance of mobile forces there to respond to potential enemy raids. The Coast Guard began these patrols after Pearl Harbor, and in early 1942 the Eastern and Western Defense Commands were assigned the equivalent of up to eight infantry regimental combat teams each for both beach patrols and mobile response. With a rapidly diminishing threat after 1942, by mid-1943 these forces were cut back significantly, and were mostly demobilized in early 1944. On the night of 12 June 1942, a patrolling Coast Guard sailor observed German agents landing from a U-boat near Amagansett, Long Island, New York. Communication difficulties precluded an immediate response, but the four agents were rounded up over the next two weeks, along another four landed near Jacksonville, Florida on 17 June. Capture was made easier when two of the agents in New York decided to defect within a few days. They were tried by a military court-martial, with six of the eight executed; one of the defectors received a life sentence and the other 30 years in prison.

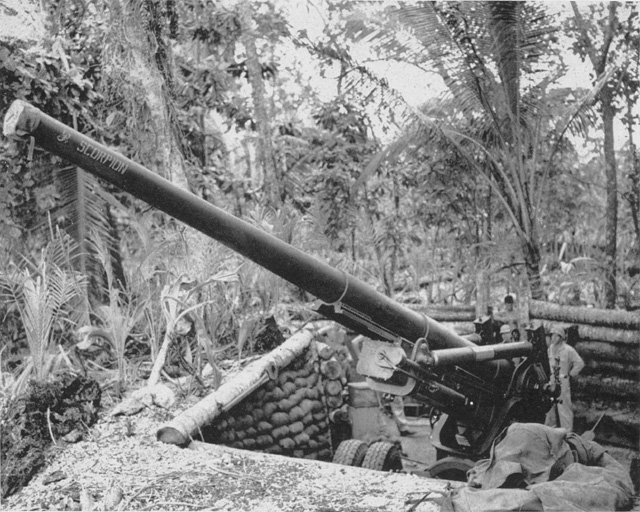
155 mm Long Tom gun "Scorpion" of the 4th Marine Defense Battalion in Barakoma, Solomon Islands.

Besides the Coast Artillery, key islands in the Pacific theater were defended by U.S. Marine defense battalions throughout the war. Their most famous engagement was the Battle of Wake Island in December 1941, in which heavy casualties were inflicted on a Japanese invasion force that eventually took the island. The U.S. Navy participated in harbor defense with anti-submarine nets and magnetic indicator loops for detecting submarines; joint harbor defense command posts and harbor entrance control posts were established at Harbor Defense Commands to coordinate army and navy operations. The 155 mm Long Tom artillery piece, an evolution of the 155 mm GPF concept, was used in island and harbor defense in the Pacific from 1943 by both the Marines and the Army. Seven Army Coast Artillery Groups (155 mm Gun) were activated in May–June 1944 as a result of breaking up the tractor-drawn 155 mm gun regiments, which may have been rearmed with the new weapon. Three were deployed to Okinawa and the Philippines in 1945 while one was activated in Trinidad; the remainder never left CONUS.

=== Coast artillery weapons during World War II ===
U.S. coast artillery during World War II relied primarily on weapons purchased between the wars or stored since the aftermath of World War I. Essentially all of the Endicott and Taft period weapons were scrapped by late 1944 as new batteries were completed. The weapons deployed during the later part of the war included:

- 16-inch gun M1919 (406 mm)
- 16"/50 caliber Mark 2 gun (also Mark 3)
- 16-inch howitzer M1920
- 14-inch M1920 railway gun (356 mm)
- 12-inch gun M1895 on long-range M1917 barbette carriage (305 mm)
- 12-inch coast defense mortar (various models) on railway mounting (almost all in reserve)
- 240 mm Howitzer M1918 (9.45 inch) on fixed mountings in Hawaii
- 8-inch gun M1888 on railway mounting (203 mm)
- 8-inch Navy gun MkVIM3A2 (on railway and fixed mountings)
- 7"/45 caliber gun (178 mm), ex-Navy guns
- 155 mm gun M1918, a tractor-drawn French-designed weapon built for the U.S. Army (6.1-inch)
- 155 mm Long Tom gun M1/M2
- 6-inch gun M1903 on a new high-angle shielded mounting (also M1905, M1/T2)
- 6-inch gun M1900 on pedestal mounting (some retained until after the war)
- 6"/50 caliber gun, ex-Navy Mark 6 and Mark 8 guns
- 5"/51 caliber gun (127 mm) Mark 15 (early-war Marine defense battalions)
- 4"/50 caliber gun (102 mm) Mark 9
- 90 mm gun M1 and M2 (3.5 in) on fixed and towed mounts
- 3-inch gun M1903 (76 mm) (some retained until after the war)
- 40 mm gun M1 (1.57 in)
- 37 mm Gun M1 (1.46 in)

== Postwar defensive missiles ==
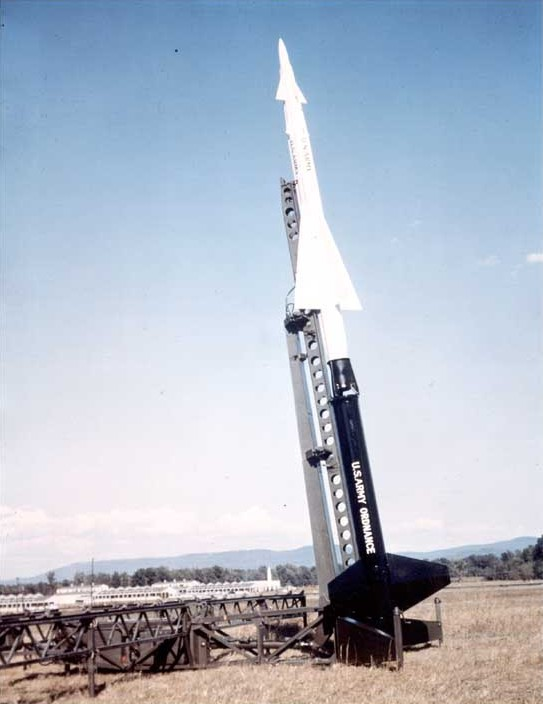
Nike-Ajax missile

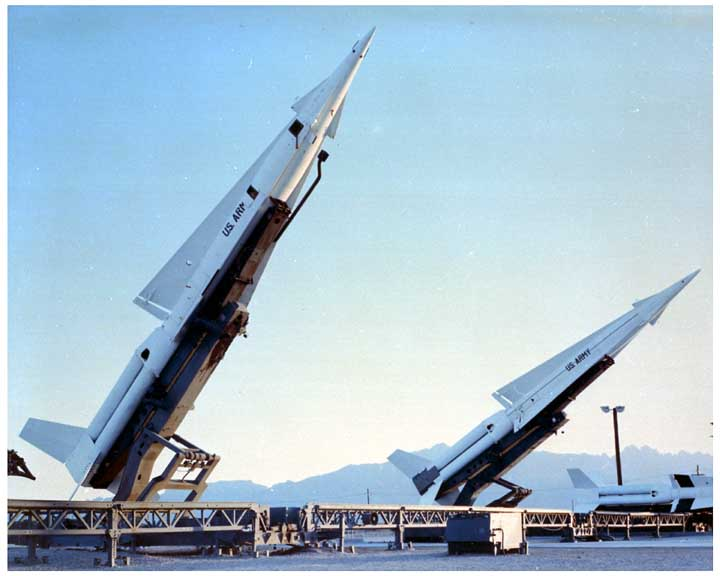
Nike-Hercules missiles

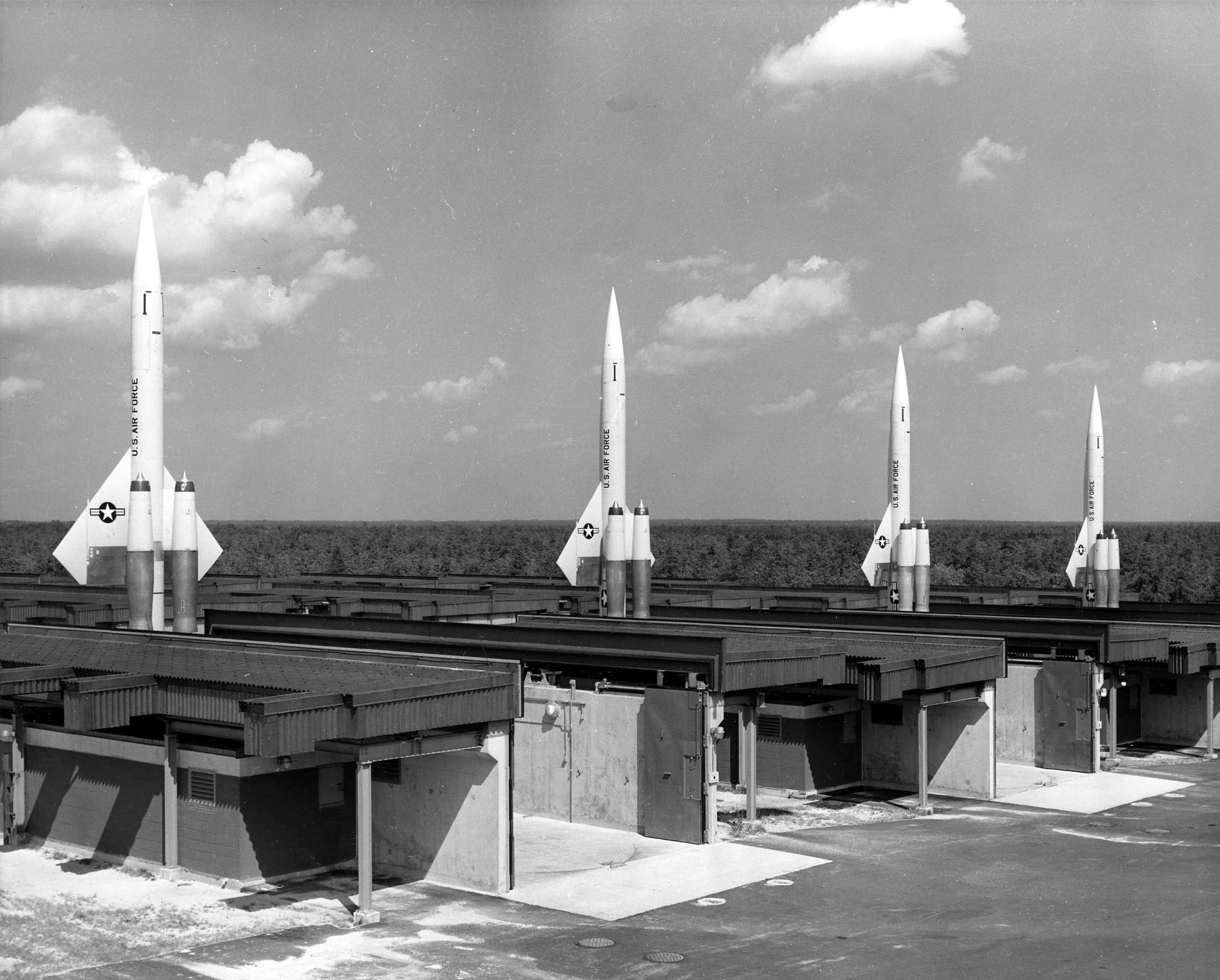
BOMARC missile site

A system of 90 mm and 120 mm anti-aircraft guns was deployed around the periphery of CONUS shortly after World War II. However, it was soon overtaken by technology. Early in the Cold War, the Soviet Union developed long-range bombers which could reach the United States, and soon after exploded their first atomic bomb. Among the most-threatened targets were harbors and naval bases. The mission of the Nike surface-to-air missile program was to act as a "last-ditch" line of air defense for selected areas. The Nike system would have been used if the Air Force's interceptor aircraft failed. With some anti-ship capability (especially the later nuclear-capable weapons), these were the last fixed-fortification weapons employed in the United States.

Nike sites were built during the 1950s in "rings" around major urban and industrial areas and key Strategic Air Command bases. The number of sites constructed in each ring varied, depending on many factors. In relatively flat terrain rings usually consisted of four launch sites, as at Washington, D.C. However, due to mountainous terrain, the San Francisco Bay area required twelve launch sites. Due to the short range of the original Nike missile, the Nike Ajax, many bases were located close to the center of the areas they protected. Frequently, they were located within heavily populated areas. By 1960, the longer-range, nuclear-capable Nike Hercules was deployed, with the Air Force's BOMARC missile system following soon after.

With the advent of numerous intercontinental ballistic missiles, the Nike and BOMARC systems were considered obsolete by the mid-1960s and the installations were removed in the early 1970s, ending nearly 200 years of American coastal defense.

== See also ==
- Advanced Base Force, the United States Navy/Marine Corps joint effort in coastal defenses of Subic Bay and the Caribbean areas during the interim years prior to World War I
- List of coastal fortifications of the United States
- Harbor Defense Command
- United States Army Coast Artillery Corps
- List of United States War Department Forms – Lists US Army ordnance publications circa 1895–1920, links online versions, including many coast artillery weapons
- United States Army Corps of Engineers
- Disappearing gun
- Siege artillery in the American Civil War

== References and further reading ==
- Berhow, Mark A., ed. (2015). American Seacoast Defenses, A Reference Guide (Third ed.). McLean, Virginia: CDSG Press. ISBN 978-0-9748167-3-9.
- Browning, Robert S., III. Two If by Sea: The Development of American Coastal Defense Policy (Praeger, 1983)
- Conn, Stetson; Engelman, Rose C.; Fairchild, Byron (2000) [1964]. Guarding the United States and its Outposts. United States Army in World War II. Washington, D.C.: Center of Military History, United States Army. Archived from the original on 2007-12-25.
- Friedman, Norman (1985). U.S. Battleships: An Illustrated Design History. Annapolis, Maryland: United States Naval Institute. ISBN 978-0-87021-715-9.
- Hogg, Ian V. (1998). Allied Artillery of World War I. Ramsbury, Wiltshire, UK: The Crowood Press, Ltd. pp. 139–140. ISBN 1-86126-104-7.
- Kaufmann, J. E.; Kaufmann, H. W. (2004). Fortress America. Da Capo Press. ISBN 0-306-81294-0.
- Lewis, Emanuel Raymond (1979). Seacoast Fortifications of the United States. Annapolis: Leeward Publications. ISBN 978-0-929521-11-4.
- McGovern, Terrance and Smith, Bolling, American Coastal Defences 1885-1950 (Fortress series, Book 44), Osprey Publishing 2006, ISBN 1-8417692-2-3
- Miller, H. W., LTC, USA (1921). Railway Artillery, Vols. I and II. Washington: US Government Printing Office.
- Morgan, Mark L; Berhow, Mark A (2002). Rings of Supersonic Steel (second ed.). Hole in the Head Press. ISBN 0-615-12012-1.
- Ordnance Corps, US Army (1922). American Coast Artillery Materiel. Washington: Government Printing Office.
- Price, Russell Reed. "American coastal defense: The Third System of fortification, 1816–1864" (PhD dissertation, Mississippi State University ProQuest Dissertations Publishing, 1999. 9930343).
- Stanton, Shelby L. (1991). World War II Order of Battle. Galahad Books. ISBN 0-88365-775-9.
- Wade, Arthur P. (2011). Artillerists and Engineers: The Beginnings of American Seacoast Fortifications 1794-1815. Mclean, Virginia: CDSG Press. ISBN 978-0-9748167-2-2.
- Weaver II, John R. (2001). A Legacy in Brick and Stone: American Coastal Defense Forts of the Third System, 1816-1867. McLean, VA: Redoubt Press. ISBN 1-57510-069-X.
- Williford, Glen (2016). American Breechloading Mobile Artillery, 1875-1953. Atglen, PA: Schiffer Publishing, Ltd. ISBN 978-0-7643-5049-8.
- Zink, Robert D. (1994). The Six-Inch Part of the Modernization Program of 1940 (PDF). CDSG Journal.
- Harbor Defenses of San Francisco The California State Military Museum
- United States Seacoast Defense Construction 1781–1948: a Brief History at the Coast Defense Study Group, Inc. website
- List of all US coastal forts and batteries at the Coast Defense Study Group, Inc. website
- FortWiki, lists most CONUS and Canadian forts
- Coast Artillery Organization, A Brief Overview CDSG, Inc.
