= House Island (Maine) =

Private island in Maine, United States

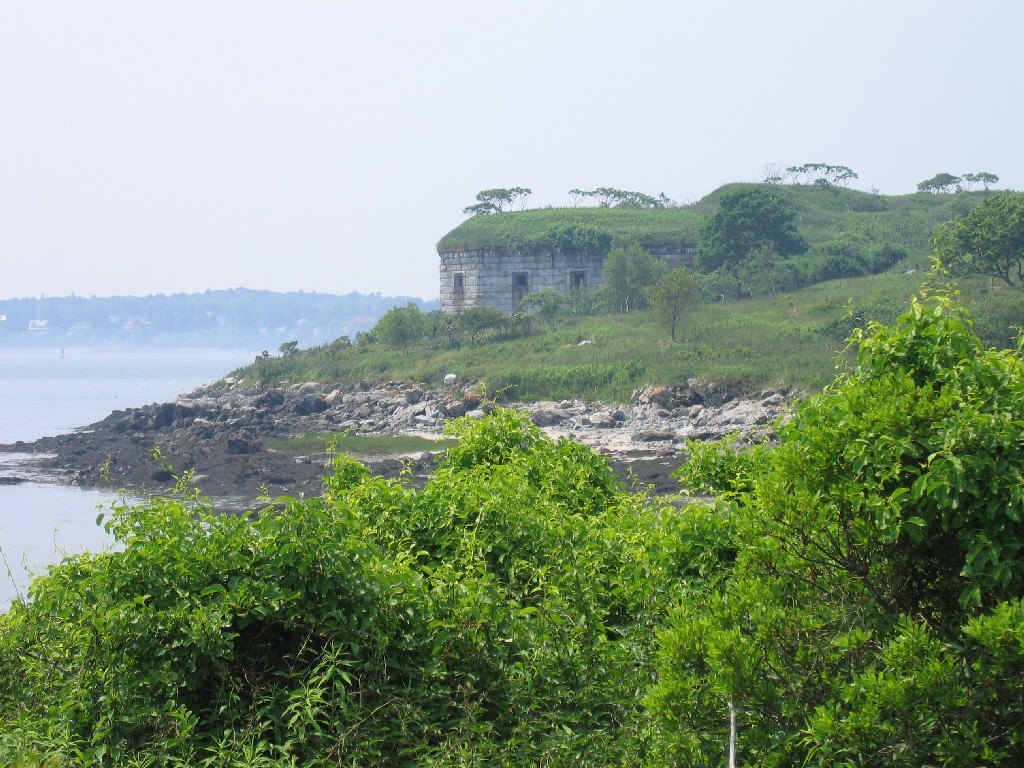
Fort Scammell, as seen from House Island

House Island is a private island in Portland Harbor in Casco Bay, Maine, United States. It is part of the City of Portland. The island is accessible only by boat. Public access is prohibited except for an on-request tour sanctioned by the island's owners. House Island includes three buildings on the east side and Fort Scammell on the west side. The buildings are used as vacation rentals and other summer residences. The island's name derives from the site of an early European house, believed that built by Capt. Christopher Levett, an English explorer of the region.

The island sold for $5.35m in 2022.

== Fort Scammell ==
Fort Scammell
- House Island, Portland, Maine
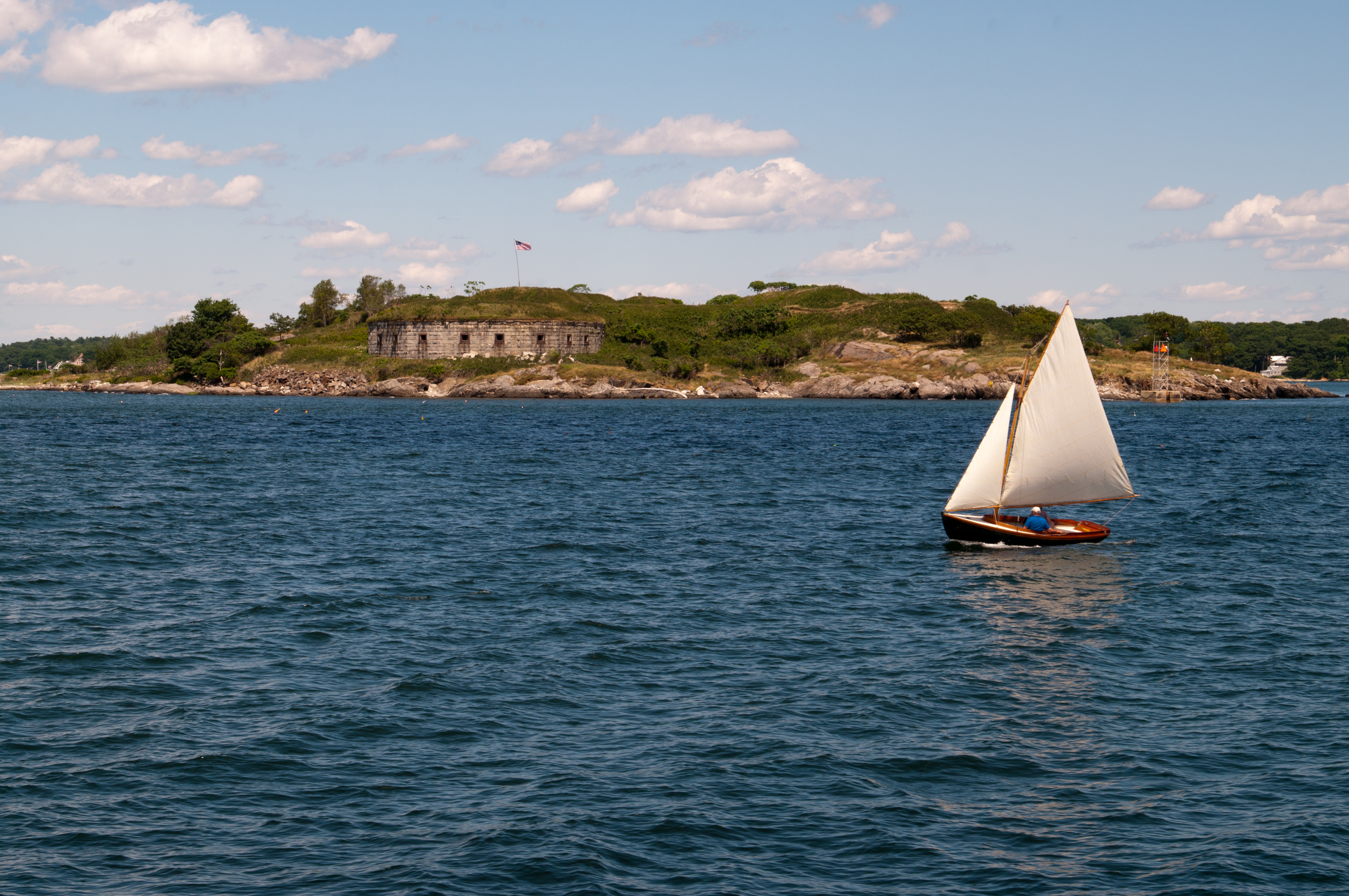
- Fort Scammell in 2012

Site information
- Type: Coastal Defense
- Owner: private
- Controlled by: private

Location
- Location in Maine
- Coordinates: 43°39′10″N 70°12′35″W

Site history
- Built: 1808
- Built by: Henry A. S. Dearborn
- In use: 1808-1900
- Battles/wars: War of 1812

Henry A. S. Dearborn, an officer of the Massachusetts Militia and a future general, built Fort Scammell on the island in 1808 as part of the national second system of fortifications. It was named after Alexander Scammell, Adjutant-General of the Continental Army during the American Revolutionary War, who was killed in action during the Battle of Yorktown. (The middle names of the fort's builder were also chosen after Scammell, a friend of the builder's father, Secretary of War Henry Dearborn.) The fort was designed for harbor defense, with cannon batteries designed to protect the main shipping channel into Portland harbor, along with Fort Preble. The spelling of the fort's name varies among references. The fort was made of stone, brick, and earth, and initially mounted fifteen guns and a 10-inch mortar. The Secretary of War's report on fortifications for 1811 describes Fort Scammell as "a circular battery of masonry with circular flanks, mounting fifteen heavy guns, is covered in the rear with a wooden blockhouse, mounting six guns...". Typical weapons of the period were 24-pounder or 32-pounder smoothbore cannon.

In the 1840s–1850s, as part of the national third system of fortifications, Fort Scammell was modernized by extending its walls to enclose a larger area. Thomas Lincoln Casey, an Army engineer officer known for his work on the Washington Monument, completely rebuilt the fort beginning in 1862 during the American Civil War. As rebuilt to the new Third System design Fort Scammell was unique in the US, with the design centered on two three-tier stone-and-brick bastions connected by earth walls rather than stone curtain walls. A third bastion was never completed. To allow timely completion, the remaining bastions had a tier or two each removed from the design. As completed, the west bastion had a single tier of casemates and the east bastion had two tiers. In the 1870s, additional earthworks to accommodate 10-inch and 15-inch Rodman guns were constructed, but only some of these were completed due to a national freeze on fort construction in the late 1870s. Fort Scammell was not re-armed in the Spanish–American War of 1898, and was listed as disarmed in a 1903 report.

Two emplacements for anti-aircraft guns were added in 1917, probably for the 3-inch gun M1917. Of all the forts in Casco Bay, Fort Scammell was the only fort to fire a shot and be fired upon in battle, in early August 1813.

== Immigration Quarantine Station ==
The island was later the site of an immigration quarantine station from 1907 to 1937, and was considered the 'Ellis Island of the North'. The quarantine station was busiest in the early 1920s, after the adoption of the Emergency Quota Act, which restricted the number of immigrants who could enter the country. In November 1923, the ships President Polk and George Washington were diverted from New York City to Portland, and 218 immigrants from those ships were quarantined at the station. Many of the immigrants were Jews from Russia. Jewish immigrant women from Portland built a kosher kitchen on the island.

The island was considered "ideal" by immigration officials. A Grand Trunk Railway station was located at the docks in Portland, allowing easy rail access for immigrants arriving in Portland. Additionally, William Husband, Commissioner General of United States Immigration, said the whole island was secure and "The whole of House Island was available in that case, instead of those detained being obliged to go out under guard with only few patches of green grass upon which they might set foot, as at some other places."

The 1920 brick detention barracks have been demolished, but the original 1907 buildings remain, including the doctor's house, the detention barracks, and the quarantine hospital.

== See also ==
- List of islands of Maine
- Seacoast defense in the United States
- List of coastal fortifications of the United States
- Harbor Defenses of Portland
