= List of DEW Line Sites =

Sites making up an early warning radar system

The Distant Early Warning Line, also known as the DEW Line or Early Warning Line, was a system of radar stations in the far northern Arctic region of Canada, with additional stations along the North Coast and Aleutian Islands of Alaska, in addition to the Faroe Islands, Greenland, and Iceland. It was set up to detect incoming Soviet bombers during the Cold War, and provide early warning for a land based invasion.

== Key ==
- Lat/Long = Latitude and Longitude
- DEW = DEW Line
- DEW Aux = DEW Line Auxiliary site
- DEW "I" site = DEW Line Intermediate site
- DEW Main = DEW Line Main site
- DEW Rear Comm. = DEW Line Rearward Communication site
- NWS = North Warning System
- NWS LRR = North Warning System Long Range Radar site
- NWS SRR = North Warning System Short Range Radar site
- NWS LSS = North Warning System Logistic Support site
- a.k.a. = also known as
- N/A DEW = Not applicable to the DEW Line
- N/A NWS = Not applicable to the North Warning System

== The sites ==
Site Code	Lat/Long	Site Type	Geographical name (associated station)	State Province Territory	Significant dates	Notes
COB 1	52°57′35″N 168°52′03″W	Aleutian DEW LRR	Nikolski (Nikolski Air Station)	AK	DEW operations ceased 30 September 1969	N/A NWS
COB 2	53°58′28″N 166°54′18″W	Aleutian DEW LRR	Driftwood Bay (Driftwood Bay Air Force Station Airfield)	AK	DEW operations ceased 30 September 1969	N/A NWS
LIZ-1	68°52′12″N 166°09′00″W	DEW "UNK" site	Cape Lisburne (Cape Lisburne Air Force Station)	AK		N/A NWS
COB 3	54°35′32″N 164°52′34″W	Aleutian DEW LRR	Cape Sarichef (Cape Sarichef Airport)	AK	DEW operations ceased 30 September 1969	N/A NWS
LIZ-2	69°01′27″N 163°51′26″W	DEW Aux / NWS LRR	Point Lay (Point Lay LRRS Airport)	AK	NWS site established 1989–1990; Site deactivated 1994	
LIZ-A	69°01′27″N 163°51′25″W	DEW "I" site	Cape Sabine (Cape Sabine DEW Line Station)	AK	"I" site operations ceased 1963	N/A NWS
COB M	55°15′49″N 162°53′08″W	Aleutian DEW LRR	Cold Bay (Cold Bay Air Force Station)	AK	DEW operations ceased 30 September 1969	N/A NWS
LIZ-B	70°17′23″N 161°54′40″W	DEW "I" site	Icy Cape (Icy Cape DEW Line Station)	AK	"I" site operations ceased 1963	N/A NWS
COB 4	55°58′41″N 160°30′01″W	Aleutian DEW LRR	Port Moller (Port Moller Airport)	AK	DEW operations ceased 30 September 1969	N/A NWS
LIZ-3	70°36′37″N 159°52′12″W	DEW Aux / NWS SRR	Wainwright (Wainwright Airport)	AK	NWS site established 1994; DEW operations ceased April 1995	Closed 2007 due to soil erosion & budget concerns
COB 5	56°58′38″N 158°39′09″W	Aleutian DEW LRR	Port Heiden (Port Heiden Air Force Station)	AK	DEW operations ceased 30 September 1969	N/A NWS – converted to an Aircraft Control and Warning radar station A height-finder radar was added
LIZ-C	70°48′29″N 158°15′32″W	DEW "I" site	Peard Bay (Peard Bay DEW Line Station)	AK	"I" site operations ceased 1963	N/A NWS
POW-MAIN	71°19′38″N 156°38′10″W	DEW Main / NWS LRR	Point Barrow (Point Barrow Long Range Radar Site)	AK	NWS site established 1989–1990	
POW-A	71°03′26″N 154°43′39″W	DEW "I" site	Cape Simpson	AK	"I" site operations ceased 1963	N/A NWS
POW-1	70°54′37″N 153°14′23″W	DEW Aux / NWS SRR	Lonely (Point Lonely Short Range Radar Site)	AK		
POW-B	70°34′36″N 152°15′56″W	DEW "I" site	Kogru	AK	"I" site operations ceased 1963	N/A NWS
POW-2	70°29′54″N 149°53′22″W	DEW Aux / NWS LRR	Oliktok Point (Oliktok Long Range Radar Site)	AK	NWS site established 1989–1990	
AGE-X	61°10′29″N 149°51′26″W	DEW Rear Comm.	Anchorage	AK	Operations ceased 1963	N/A NWS
POW-C	70°24′10″N 148°40′46″W	DEW "I" site	Point McIntyre	AK	"I" site operations ceased 1963	N/A NWS
POW-3	70°10′34″N 146°51′19″W	DEW Aux / NWS SRR	Flaxman Island a.k.a. Bullen Point	AK	DEW operations ceased April 1995; NWS site established 1994	Site is physically located at Bullen Point; Closed 2007 due to soil erosion and budget concerns
POW-D	69°58′29″N 144°50′09″W	DEW "I" site	Brownlow Point	AK	"I" site operations ceased 1963	N/A NWS; Site located 1.3 mi (2.1 km) SE Collinson Point
BAR-MAIN	70°07′49″N 143°38′21″W	DEW Main / NWS LRR	Barter Island (Barter Island LRRS Airport)	AK	NWS site established 15 November 1990	Local community name: Kaktovik
BAR-A	69°53′11″N 142°18′43″W	DEW "I" site	Demarcation Bay a.k.a. Nuvagapak Point	AK	"I" site operations ceased 1963	N/A NWS; Site physically located at Nuvagapak Point
BAR-1	69°35′41″N 140°10′41″W	DEW Aux / NWS SRR	Komakuk Beach	YT	DEW operations ceased 4 August 1993; NWS site established October 1990	
BAR-B	69°19′49″N 138°44′13″W	DEW "I" site / NWS SRR	Stokes Point	YT	"I" site operations ceased 1963; NWS site established July 1991	
BAR-2	68°55′22″N 137°15′38″W	DEW Aux / NWS LRR	Shingle Point	YT	DEW operations ceased June 1989; NWS site established June 1989	
BAR-C	69°00′21″N 134°40′05″W	DEW "I" site	Tununuk Camp	NT	"I" site operations ceased 1963	N/A NWS
BAR-BA 3	68°53′39″N 133°56′31″W	NWS SRR	Storm Hills	NT	NWS site established November 1990	N/A DEW
BAR-3	69°26′35″N 132°59′55″W	DEW Aux / NWS SRR	Tuktoyaktuk (Tuktoyaktuk/James Gruben Airport)	NT	DEW operations ceased 13 September 1993; NWS site established September 1990	
BAR-D	69°55′59″N 131°25′54″W	DEW "I" site	Atkinson Point	NT	"I" site operations ceased 1963	N/A NWS
BAR-DA 1	69°36′15″N 130°53′37″W	NWS SRR	Liverpool Bay	NT	NWS site established November 1990	N/A DEW
BAR-4	69°55′27″N 128°58′24″W	DEW Aux / NWS SRR	Nicholson Peninsula	NT	DEW operations ceased 9 September 1993; NWS site established October 1990	
BAR-E	70°00′59″N 126°56′35″W	DEW "I" site / NWS SRR	Horton River a.k.a. Malloch Hills	NT	"I" site operations ceased 1963; NWS site established June 1991	
PIN-MAIN	70°10′17″N 124°43′30″W	DEW Main / NWS LRR	Cape Parry	NT	DEW operations ceased August 1989; NWS site established August 1989	
PIN-A	69°48′55″N 122°43′02″W	DEW "I" site	Pierce Point	NT	"I" site operations ceased 1963	N/A NWS
NEL-X	58°48′21″N 122°41′38″W	DEW Rear Comm.	Fort Nelson	BC	Operations ceased 1963	N/A NWS
PIN-1BD	69°40′22″N 121°40′19″W	NWS SRR	Keats Point	NT	NWS site established July 1991	N/A DEW
PIN-1	69°35′00″N 120°44′46″W	DEW Aux	Clinton Point	NT	DEW operations ceased 3 September 1993	N/A NWS
PIN-1BG	69°16′00″N 119°13′00″W	NWS SRR	Croker River	NU	NWS site established August 1991	N/A DEW
PIN-B	69°12′56″N 118°38′11″W	DEW "I" site	Clifton Point	NU	"I" site operations ceased 1963	N/A NWS
PIN-2A	68°50′10″N 116°58′05″W	NWS SRR	Harding River	NU	NWS site established September 1991	N/A DEW
PIN-2	68°56′08″N 116°56′10″W	DEW Aux	Cape Young	NU	DEW operations ceased 31 August 1993	N/A NWS
PIN-CB	68°45′19″N 114°56′21″W	NWS SRR	Bernard Harbour	NU	NWS site established September 1991	N/A DEW; Site is 3.3 mi (5.3 km) SW of DEW site.
PIN-C	68°46′55″N 114°50′01″W	DEW "I" site	Bernard Harbour	NU	"I" site operations ceased 1963	N/A NWS
PIN-3	68°28′45″N 113°13′32″W	DEW Aux / NWS LRR	Lady Franklin Point	NU	NWS site established June 1989; DEW operations ceased June 1989	Site burnt down 10 January 2000
PIN-D	68°32′10″N 111°11′55″W	DEW "I" site	Ross Point	NU	"I" site operations ceased 1963	N/A NWS
WAT-X	56°27′00″N 111°02′00″W	DEW Rear Comm.	Waterways a.k.a. Stoney Mountain	AB	Operations ceased 1964	N/A NWS
PIN-DA	68°29′09″N 110°51′50″W	NWS SRR	Edinburgh Island	NU	NWS site established October 1991	N/A DEW
PIN-4	68°45′35″N 109°05′16″W	DEW Aux	Byron Bay	NU	DEW operations ceased 21 August 1993	N/A NWS
PIN-EB	69°02′11″N 107°49′18″W	NWS SRR	Cape Peel West	NU	NWS operations ceased October 1991	N/A DEW
PIN-E	69°02′41″N 107°19′33″W	DEW "I" site	Cape Peel	NU	"I" site operations ceased 1963	N/A NWS
CAM-MAIN	69°06′58″N 105°07′08″W	DEW Main / NWS LRR/LSS	Cambridge Bay (Cambridge Bay Airport)	NU	NWS site established September 1989; DEW operations ceased September 1989	Main transportation hub
CAM-A3A	68°57′47″N 103°45′34″W	NWS SRR	Sturt Point	NU	NWS site established October 1991	N/A DEW
CAM-A	68°47′45″N 103°20′40″W	DEW "I" site	Sturt Point	NU	"I" site operations ceased 1963	N/A NWS
CAM-1A	68°44′31″N 101°51′17″W	NWS SRR	Jenny Lind Island	NU	NWS site established October 1990	N/A DEW
CAM-1	68°39′25″N 101°44′19″W	DEW Aux	Jenny Lind Island	NU	DEW operations ceased 1992	N/A NWS
CAM-B	68°19′02″N 100°04′09″W	DEW "I" site / NWS SRR	Hat Island	NU	"I" site operations ceased 1963; NWS site established September 1991	
CAM-2	68°40′48″N 097°48′38″W	DEW Aux / NWS SRR	Gladman Point	NU	NWS site established October 1990; DEW operations ceased	
CAM-CB	68°38′39″N 095°52′10″W	NWS SRR	Gjoa Haven (Gjoa Haven Airport)	NU	NWS site established October 1990	N/A DEW
CAM-C	68°52′09″N 095°09′27″W	DEW "I" site	Matheson Point	NU	"I" site operations ceased 1963	N/A NWS
BIR-X	56°30′20″N 094°12′49″W	DEW Rear Comm.	Bird	MB	Operations ceased 1963	N/A NWS
CAM-3	68°47′34″N 093°26′25″W	DEW Aux / NWS LRR	Shepherd Bay	NU	NWS site established July 1989; DEW operations ceased July 1989	
CAM-D	68°35′41″N 091°57′24″W	DEW "I" site / NWS SRR	Simpson Lake a.k.a. Site 25	NU	"I" site operations ceased 1963; NWS site established September 1991	SRR site approximately 3/4 mi (1.2 km) W of DEW site.
CAM-4	68°26′13″N 089°43′34″W	DEW Aux / NWS SRR	Pelly Bay (Kugaaruk Airport)	NU	NWS site established September 1991; DEW operations ceased 1992	
CAM-E	68°15′22″N 088°10′25″W	DEW "I" site	Keith Bay	NU	"I" site operations ceased 1963	N/A NWS
CAM-5	68°18′03″N 085°40′29″W	DEW Aux	Mackar Inlet	NU	DEW operations ceased 1992	N/A NWS
CAM-5A	68°39′56″N 085°35′28″W	NWS SRR	Cape McLoughlin	NU	NWS site established July 1992	N/A DEW
CAM-FA	69°06′38″N 083°32′23″W	NWS SRR	Lailor River	NU	NWS site established August 1992	N/A DEW
CAM-F	68°34′04″N 083°28′53″W	DEW "I" site	Scarpa Lake a.k.a. Site 29	NU	"I" site operations ceased 1963	N/A NWS
FOX-MAIN	68°45′39″N 081°13′35″W	DEW Main / NWS LRR/LSS	Hall Beach a.k.a. Site 30 (Hall Beach Airport)	NU	NWS site established September 1989 DEW operations ceased September 1989	Main transportation hub
FOX-1	69°04′01″N 079°03′55″W	DEW Aux / NWS SRR	Rowley Island	NU	NWS site established August 1991	
FOX-A	69°13′26″N 077°13′48″W	DEW "I" site / NWS SRR	Bray Island a.k.a. Site 32	NU	"I" site operations ceased 1963; NWS site established August 1991	
FOX-2	68°53′56″N 075°08′20″W	DEW Aux / NWS SRR	Longstaff Bluff a.k.a. Site 33	NU	NWS site established November 1990; DEW operations ceased 1991	DEW site coordinates – 68°53′59.60″N 75°08′43.52″W
FOX-B	68°37′10″N 073°12′45″W	DEW "I" site / NWS SRR	Nudluardjk Lake a.k.a. West Baffin	NU	"I" site operations ceased 1963; NWS site established October 1991	
FOX-3	68°39′02″N 071°13′58″W	DEW Aux / NWS LRR	Dewar Lakes	NU	NWS site established July 1989; DEW operations ceased July 1989	
FOX-CA	68°38′51″N 069°07′47″W	N/A DEW / NWS SRR	Kangok Fjord	NU	NWS site established September 1992	
FOX-C	68°43′53″N 068°35′15″W	DEW "I" site	Ekalugad	NU	"I" site operations ceased 1963	N/A NWS
FOX-4	68°28′21″N 066°48′01″W	DEW Aux / NWS SRR	Cape Hooper a.k.a. Site 37	NU	NWS site established December 1990; DEW operations ceased 1991	
FOX-D	67°57′58″N 064°54′28″W	DEW "I" site	Kivitoo	NU	"I" site operations ceased 1963	N/A NWS
BAF-5 (RES-X)	61°35′47″N 064°38′20″W	DEW Rear Comm. / NWS SRR	Resolution Island (CFS Resolution Island)	NU	NWS site established September 1991; Pinetree operations ceased November 1961	Former Pinetree Line site
BAF-4A	62°30′22″N 064°31′06″W	NWS SRR	Loks Land	NU	NWS site established August 1992	N/A DEW
LAB-1	59°59′15″N 064°09′55″W	NWS SRR	Cape Kakiviak	NL	NWS site established July 1992	N/A DEW
BAF-3 (RES-X-1)	63°20′24″N 064°09′29″W	DEW Rear Comm. / NWS LRR	Brevoort Island	NU	NWS site established October 1988	
FOX-5	67°32′05″N 063°47′10″W	DEW Aux / NWS SRR	Broughton Island a.k.a. Qikiqtarjuaq a.k.a. Site 39 (Qikiqtarjuaq Airport)	NU	NWS site established December 1990; DEW operations ceased 1991	SRR site, approximately 7 NM (13 km; 8.1 mi) SE of Qikiqtarjuaq
BAF-2	64°57′17″N 063°33′38″W	NWS SRR	Cape Mercy	NU	NWS site established July 1992	N/A DEW
LAB-2	58°29′19″N 062°35′08″W	NWS LRR	Saglek (CFS Saglek)	NL	NWS site established November 1988	N/A DEW – former Pinetree Line site.
FOX-E	67°05′00″N 062°12′59″W	DEW "I" site	Durban Island	NU	"I" site operations ceased 1963	N/A NWS
LAB-3	57°08′07″N 061°28′32″W	NWS SRR	Cape Kiglapait	NL	NWS site established August 1992	N/A DEW
DYE-MAIN	66°39′52″N 061°21′21″W	DEW Main / NWS LRR	Cape Dyer a.k.a. Site 41	NU	NWS site established August 1989; DEW operations ceased August 1989	Main communications hub
LAB-4	55°44′30″N 060°25′42″W	NWS SRR	Big Bay	NL	NWS site established September 1992	N/A DEW
LAB-5	54°42′53″N 058°21′30″W	NWS SRR	Tukialik	NL	NWS site established October 1992	N/A DEW
LAB-6	53°33′04″N 056°49′48″W	NWS LRR	Cartwright (Cartwright Air Station)	NL	NWS site established November 1988; Pinetree operations ceased June 1968	N/A DEW – Former Pinetree Line site
DYE-1	66°38′03″N 052°52′12″W	DEW Aux	Qaqqatoqaq near Sisimiut	GL	De-activated 1988	N/A NWS
DYE-2	66°29′30″N 046°18′19″W^{b}	DEW Aux	Ice Cap 1	GL	De-activated 1 October 1988	N/A NWS
DYE-3	65°10′57″N 043°49′10″W^{b}	DEW Aux	Ice Cap 2	GL	De-activated 1988	N/A NWS
DYE-4	65°31′39″N 037°09′34″W	DEW Aux	Kulusuk Island	GL	De-activated 1991	N/A NWS – 24 September 1991 last American out
DYE-5	64°02′07″N 022°39′08″W	DEW LRR	Rockville Air Station	IS	De-activated 1998	N/A NWS
DYE-6	67°00′38″N 050°42′33″W	DEW Aux	Sondrestrom Air Base	GL	De-activated 1992	Control Center
