= List of military installations in Newfoundland and Labrador =

This is a list of former and current military installations in Newfoundland and Labrador, Canada.

== Newfoundland and Labrador ==
Name	Location	Operator	Branch	Date	Coordinates	Ref
Allan's Island Radar Station	Allan's Island	(United States) USA	United States Army	1943–1945	46°50′52″N 55°48′17″W	
Anti-Motor Torpedo Boat Battery–Black Point	Black Point	(United States) USA	Coast Artillery Corps	1941–1945	47°11′40″N 54°02′25″W	
Anti-Motor Torpedo Boat Battery–Ship Harbour	Ship Harbour	(United States) USA	Coast Artillery Corps	1941–1945	47°21′09″N 53°55′36″W	
Argentia Nuclear Weapons Storage Complex	Argentia	(United States) USA	Submarine Force Atlantic	1968–1994	47°17′26″N 53°58′37″W	
Battery 282	McAndrew	(United States) USA	United States Army	1941–1945	47°16′25″N 53°59′23″W	
Battle Harbour LORAN-A	Battle Harbour	Canada	Royal Canadian Navy	1942–1983	52°14′52″N 55°36′41″W	
Beaumont Hamel Armoury	Grand Falls	Canada	Canadian Army	1950–present	48°56′08″N 55°39′36″W	
Bell Island Battery	Bell Island	(United States) USA	United States Army	1943–1945	47°37′49″N 52°55′36″W	
Big Bay Radar Site	Labrador	Canada	NORAD	1992–present	55°44′19″N 60°25′47″W	
Border Beacon	Labrador	(United States) USA	United States Air Force	1958–1965	55°19′58″N 63°12′51″W	
Brig Harbour Radar Station	Brig Harbour Island	Canada	Royal Canadian Air Force	1942–1945	54°32′44″N 57°10′23″W	
Cambrai Armoury	Stephenville	Canada	Canadian Army	1950–present	48°32′52″N 58°33′32″W	
Cambrai Rifle Range	Makinsons	Canada	Canadian Army	1975–present	47°29′30″N 53°20′11″W	
Camp Alexander	St. John's	(United States) USA	United States Army Air Forces	1941–1942	47°34′35″N 52°43′03″W	
Canadian Coastal Radar–Gander	Gander	Canada	Royal Canadian Air Force	1991–present	48°56′37″N 54°34′56″W	
Cape Bonavista LORAN-A	Cape Bonavista	Canada	Royal Canadian Navy	1942–2012	48°41′48″N 53°05′18″W	
Cape Bonavista High-Frequency Surface-Wave Radar	Cape Bonavista	Canada	Royal Canadian Air Force	1999–2007	48°41′47″N 53°05′17″W	
Cape Bauld Radar Station	Quirpon Island	Canada	Royal Canadian Air Force	1942–1945	51°38′10″N 55°25′49″W	
Cape Kakiviak Radar Site	Torngat Mountains	Canada	NORAD	1992–present	59°59′15″N 64°09′55″W	
Cape Kiglapait Radar Site	Kiglapait Mountains	Canada	NORAD	1992–present	57°08′07″N 61°28′32″W	
Cape Makkovik Air Station	Cape Makkovik	(United States) USA	United States Air Force	1957–1961	55°13′30″N 59°08′45″W	
Cape Race LORAN-C	Cape Race	(United States) USA	United States Coast Guard	1965–2012	46°46′33″N 53°10′28″W	
Cape Race High-Frequency Surface-Wave Radar	Cape Race	Canada	Royal Canadian Air Force	1999–2007	46°46′34″N 53°10′29″W	
Cape Ray Radar Station	Table Mountain	Canada	Royal Canadian Air Force	1942–1945	47°42′39″N 59°13′36″W	
Cape Spear Radar Station	Cape Spear	(United States) USA	United States Army	1943–1945	47°31′25″N 52°37′10″W	
Cartwright Air Station	Cartwright	(United States) USA	United States Air Force	1952–1968	53°43′28″N 56°57′51″W	
Cartwright Radar Site	Cartwright	Canada	NORAD	1998–present	53°33′04″N 56°49′48″W	
Castle Hill	Placentia	France	French Army	1662–1713	47°15′04″N 53°58′17″W	
CFB Gander	Gander	Canada	Royal Canadian Air Force	1941–present	48°56′13″N 54°34′05″W	
CFB Goose Bay	Happy Valley-Goose Bay	Canada	Royal Canadian Air Force	1941–present	53°19′09″N 60°25′33″W	
CFS Saglek	Saglek Bay	Canada	NORAD	1988–present	58°29′01″N 62°40′07″W	
CFS St. John's	St. John's	Canada	Royal Canadian Navy	1949–present	47°34′59″N 52°41′38″W	
Comfort Cove LORAN-C	Comfort Cove	(United States) USA	United States Coast Guard	1966–2012	49°19′54″N 54°51′43″W	
Cut Throat Island Air Station	Cut Throat Island	(United States) USA	United States Air Force	1957–1961	54°29′47″N 57°08′00″W	
Elliston Ridge Air Station	Bonavista Peninsula	(United States) USA	United States Air Force	1957–1961	48°37′33″N 53°03′31″W	
Elliston Ridge Radar Station	Bonavista Peninsula	(United States) USA	United States Army	1943–1945	48°37′38″N 53°03′27″W	
Ernest Harmon Air Force Base	Stephenville	(United States) USA	United States Air Force	1942–1976	48°32′38″N 58°33′12″W	
FRD-10 Wullenweber	Gander	Canada	Communications Security Establishment	1971–present	48°57′04″N 54°31′31″W	
Fire Control Station No. 11	White Hills	(United States) USA	United States Army	1943–1945	47°35′10″N 52°40′20″W	
Fire Control Station No. 12	Logy Bay	(United States) USA	United States Army	1943–1945	47°38′48″N 52°39′41″W	
Fire Control Station No. 16	Flatrock	(United States) USA	United States Army	1943–1945	47°42′06″N 52°41′58″W	
Fogo Island Radar Station	Fogo Island	(United States) USA	United States Army	1943–1945	49°42′32″N 54°04′19″W	
Fort Amherst	St. John's	Great Britain	British Army	1770–1945	47°33′49″N 52°40′49″W	
Fort Baie-Château	Chateau Bay	France	French Army	1740–1763	52°00′19″N 55°51′59″W	
Fort Baie-Rouge	Red Bay	France	French Army	1713–1763	51°43′43″N 56°25′18″W	
Fort Chain Rock	Signal Hill	(United States) USA	United States Army	1941–1945	47°34′03″N 52°41′14″W	
Fort Ferryland	Ferryland	England	Royal Navy	1620–1673	47°01′25″N 52°53′03″W	
Fort Frederick	Placentia	Great Britain	British Army	1721–1746	47°14′57″N 53°57′42″W	
Fort McAndrew	Argentia	(United States) USA	United States Army	1941–1946	47°17′17″N 53°58′51″W	
Fort Plaisance	Placentia	France	French Army	1662–1713	47°15′10″N 53°58′05″W	
Fort Point	Trinity	Great Britain	British Army	1744–1820	48°21′55″N 53°20′42″W	
Fort Grand Saint-Modet	West St. Modeste	France	French Army	1732–1848	51°35′22″N 56°42′28″W	
Fort Royal	Placentia	France	French Army	1687–1713	47°15′04″N 53°58′17″W	
Fort Saint Louis	Placentia	France	French Army	1690–1713	47°15′05″N 53°57′52″W	
Fort Townshend	St. John's	Great Britain	British Army	1775–1871	47°33′58″N 52°42′40″W	
Fort Waldegrave	St. John's	Great Britain	British Army	1798–1871	47°34′08″N 52°41′27″W	
Fort William	St. John's	England	Royal Navy	1698–1871	47°34′15″N 52°42′02″W	
Fort York	Henley Harbour	Great Britain	British Army	1766–1796	52°00′18″N 55°51′58″W	
Fox Harbour Air Station	St. Lewis	(United States) USA	United States Air Force	1957–1961	52°22′12″N 55°39′52″W	
Fox Harbour LORAN-C	St. Lewis	(United States) USA	United States Coast Guard	1966–2012	52°22′35″N 55°42′29″W	
Gallipoli Armoury	Corner Brook	Canada	Canadian Army	1950–present	48°56′45″N 57°55′59″W	
Goose Air Defense Sector	Goose Bay	(United States) USA	Aerospace Defense Command	1960–1966	53°19′33″N 60°24′56″W	
Goose Air Force Base	Happy Valley-Goose Bay	(United States) USA	United States Air Force	1941–1994	53°19′36″N 60°24′54″W	
Goose Air Weapons Range	Labrador	Canada	Royal Canadian Air Force	1977–present	52°17′20″N 60°57′14″W	
Goose Nuclear Weapons Storage Complex	Happy Valley-Goose Bay	(United States) USA	Strategic Air Command	1953–1974	53°17′44″N 60°22′37″W	
Harbor Defenses of St. John's	St. John's	(United States) USA	United States Army	1941–1945	47°35′10″N 52°41′31″W	
HMC Dockyard Bay Bulls	Bay Bulls	Canada	Royal Canadian Navy	1940–1948	47°18′57″N 52°48′37″W	
HMCS Cabot	St. John's	Canada	Royal Canadian Navy	1949–present	47°33′33″N 52°42′12″W	
HMCS Caribou	Corner Brook	Canada	Royal Canadian Navy	1953–1958	48°57′30″N 57°56′34″W	
HMS Calypso	St. John's	Dominion of Newfoundland	Newfoundland Naval Reserve	1902–1922	49°17′42″N 55°01′06″W	
HMS Wireless Station–St. John's	Mount Pearl	United Kingdom	Royal Navy	1915–1949	47°30′17″N 52°47′41″W	
Hopedale Air Station	Hopedale	(United States) USA	United States Air Force	1953–1968	55°27′59″N 60°13′47″W	
La Scie Air Station	La Scie	(United States) USA	United States Air Force	1957–1961	49°58′50″N 55°31′48″W	
Lewisport Battery	Bay of Exploits	(United States) USA	United States Army	1943–1945	49°14′40″N 55°03′17″W	
Manuels Battery	Conception Bay	(United States) USA	United States Army	1943–1945	47°31′52″N 52°57′24″W	
McAndrew Air Force Base	Argentia	(United States) USA	United States Air Force	1948–1955	47°17′05″N 53°59′21″W	
Melville Air Station	Dome Mountain	(United States) USA	United States Air Force	1953–1988	53°17′45″N 60°32′23″W	
Mid-Canada Line	Labrador	Canada	Royal Canadian Air Force	1956–1965	55°18′07″N 66°42′18″W	
Naval Station Argentia	Argentia	(United States) USA	United States Navy	1941–1994	47°18′22″N 53°59′24″W	
Northeast Arm Naval Camp	Dunville	(United States) USA	United States Navy	1943–1994	47°16′13″N 53°51′01″W	
Pepperrell Air Force Base	St. John's	(United States) USA	United States Air Force	1941–1961	47°35′10″N 52°41′31″W	
Phillip's Head Battery	Bay of Exploits	(United States) USA	United States Army	1943–1945	49°13′29″N 55°18′06″W	
Pole Vault	St. John's	Canada	Royal Canadian Air Force	1955–1975	47°35′12″N 52°41′33″W	
Port aux Basques Radar Station	Port aux Basques	Canada	Royal Canadian Air Force	1942–1945	47°34′14″N 59°09′04″W	
Queen's Battery	St. John's	United Kingdom	British Army	1796–1871	47°34′07″N 52°41′09″W	
Quidi Vidi Battery	Quidi Vidi	France	French Army	1762–1762	47°34′49″N 52°40′25″W	
RAF(U) Goose Bay	Happy Valley-Goose Bay	United Kingdom	Royal Air Force	1942–2005	53°18′34″N 60°24′22″W	
RCAF Aerodrome Torbay	St. John's	Canada	Royal Canadian Air Force	1941–1961	47°37′07″N 52°45′09″W	
RCAF Saglek	Saglek Bay	Canada	Royal Canadian Air Force	1970–1986	58°28′28″N 62°39′15″W	
RCAF Station Botwood	Bay of Exploits	Canada	Royal Canadian Air Force	1937–1946	49°09′25″N 55°20′08″W	
Red Cliff Air Station	Logy Bay	(United States) USA	United States Air Force	1953–1961	47°38′20″N 52°40′02″W	
Royal Navy Air Section Argentia	Argentia	United Kingdom	Fleet Air Arm	1943–1944	47°18′39″N 53°59′21″W	
Saglek Air Station	Saglek Bay	(United States) USA	United States Air Force	1953–1970	58°29′19″N 62°35′08″W	
Saint Anthony Air Station	St. Anthony	(United States) USA	United States Air Force	1953–1968	51°20′57″N 55°36′39″W	
Smith's Battery	Bois Island	Great Britain	Royal Navy	1743–1784	47°01′38″N 52°51′51″W	
Spotted Island Air Station	Spotted Island	(United States) USA	United States Air Force	1957–1961	53°31′05″N 55°44′56″W	
St. Bride's Radar Station	St. Bride's	(United States) USA	United States Army	1943–1945	46°55′55″N 54°10′49″W	
STADAN	Shoe Cove	(United States) USA	NASA	1960–1983	47°44′28″N 52°43′15″W	
Stephenville Air Station	Stephenville	(United States) USA	United States Air Force	1951–1971	48°35′21″N 58°39′58″W	
T8503 Battery	Port Harmon	(United States) USA	Coast Artillery Corps	1941–1945	48°31′53″N 58°33′26″W	
Torbay Battery	Torbay	Great Britain	British Army	1781–1795	47°39′35″N 52°43′59″W	
Tukialik Radar Site	Labrador	Canada	NORAD	1992–present	54°42′53″N 58°21′30″W	
VOUS (AM)	Argentia	(United States) USA	American Forces Network	1941–1994	47°17′58.6″N 53°56′50.9″W	
Weather Station Kurt	Martin Bay	Nazi Germany	Kriegsmarine	1943–1944	60°05′00″N 64°22′51″W	

== See also ==
- List of military installations in Canada
- List of United States military bases
