= List of military installations in Canada =

This is a list of former and current military installations owned or used generally by the Regular Force of the Canadian Armed Forces and foreign countries in Canada. For current and former Reserve Force and militia locations, refer to the city by city list of armouries in Canada. For former British Commonwealth Air Training Plan sites, see List of British Commonwealth Air Training Plan facilities in Canada.

== Alberta ==
Name	Location	Operator	Branch	Date	Coordinates	Ref
British Army Training Unit Suffield	Suffield	(United Kingdom) UK	British Army	1971–present	50°16′17.7″N 111°09′46.8″W	
CFB Calgary	Lincoln Park, Calgary	Canada	Canadian Army	1935–1996	51°0′47″N 114°7′37″W	
CFB Cold Lake	Cold Lake	Canada	Royal Canadian Air Force	1954–present	54°24′19″N 110°16′56″W	
CFB Edmonton	Sturgeon County	Canada	Canadian Army	1955–present	53°40′09″N 113°28′32″W	
Currie Armoury	Lincoln Park, Calgary	Canada	Canadian Army	1997–prsesent	51°00′57″N 114°07′18″W	
RCAF Station Penhold	Penhold	Canada	Royal Canadian Air Force	1941–1944	52.177°N 113.890°W	
CFB Suffield	Suffield	Canada	Canadian Army	1971–present	50°16′24″N 111°10′30″W	
3rd Canadian Division Support Base Detachment Wainwright	Wainwright	Canada	Canadian Army	1946–present	52°49′41″N 110°54′16″W	
HMCS Nonsuch	Edmonton	Canada	Royal Canadian Navy	1927–present	53.566°N 113.524°W	
HMCS Tecumseh	Calgary	Canada	Royal Canadian Navy	1923–present	51.037°N 114.116°W	
RCAF Station Edmonton	Edmonton	Canada	Royal Canadian Air Force	1940–1955	53.571944°N 113.519444°W	
Relief Landing Field–Airdrie	Airdrie	Canada	Royal Canadian Air Force	1941–1945	51°15′52″N 113°56′10″W	

== British Columbia ==
Name	Location	Operator	Branch	Date	Coordinates	Ref
Arundel Castle	North Saanich	Canada	Royal Canadian Air Force	1988–present	48°38′50″N 123°25′33″W	
Canadian Coastal Radar–Holberg	Vancouver Island	Canada	Royal Canadian Air Force	1991–present	50°38′25″N 128°07′45″W	
CFB Comox	Comox Valley	Canada	Royal Canadian Air Force	1942–present	49°42′39″N 124°53′12″W	
CFB Esquimalt	Esquimalt	Canada	Royal Canadian Navy	1860–present	48°25′52″N 123°25′54″W	
CFS Masset	Masset	Canada	Royal Canadian Air Force	1943–1997	54°01′11″N 132°06′30″W	
Experimental and Test Ranges	Nanoose Bay	Canada	Royal Canadian Navy	–present	49°15′59″N 124°09′03″W	
FMF Cape Breton	Esquimalt	Canada	Royal Canadian Navy	1860–present	48°25′54″N 123°25′56″W	
FRD-10 Wullenweber	Masset	Canada	Communications Security Establishment	1971–present	54°01′44″N 132°03′55″W	
HMCS Discovery	Vancouver	Canada	Royal Canadian Navy	1941–present	49°17′42.76″N 123°7′22.13″W	
HMCS Malahat	Victoria	Canada	Royal Canadian Navy	1947–present	48.4229°N 123.3867°W	
NRS Aldergrove	Aldergrove	Canada	Royal Canadian Navy	1942–present	49°05′00″N 122°29′00″W	
Royal Navy Dockyard, Esquimalt	Esquimalt	(United Kingdom) UK	Royal Navy	1842–1905	48°25′52″N 123°25′54″W	
Royal Roads Military College	Colwood	Canada	Canadian Armed Forces	1940–1995	48°26′04″N 123°28′22″W	

== Manitoba ==
Name	Location	Operator	Branch	Date	Coordinates	Ref
CFB Portage la Prairie	Portage la Prairie	Canada	Royal Canadian Air Force	1940–1945; 1950–1992	49°55′N 098°17′W	
CFB Rivers	Rivers	Canada	Royal Canadian Air Force	1940–1971	50°00′38″N 100°18′49″W	
CFB Shilo	Sprucewoods	Canada	Canadian Army	1932–present	49°48′N 099°38′W	
CFB Winnipeg	Winnipeg	Canada	Royal Canadian Air Force	1925–present	49°54′36″N 97°14′24″W	
CFS Churchill	Churchill	Canada	Canadian Army	1956–present	58°43′30″N 94°07′00″W	
HMCS Chippawa	Winnipeg	Canada	Royal Canadian Navy	1941–present	49.886°N 97.137°W	

== New Brunswick ==
Name	Location	Operator	Branch	Date	Coordinates	Ref
Camp Sussex	Sussex	Canada	Canadian Army	1885–1969	45.725367°N 65.499782°W	
CFB Chatham	Chatham	Canada	Royal Canadian Air Force	1949–1991	47°0′49.3″N 65°26′49.5″W	
CFB Moncton	Moncton	Canada	Royal Canadian Air Force	1968–1996	46.091515°N 64.796784°W	
5th Canadian Division Support Base Gagetown	Gagetown	Canada	Canadian Army	1958–present	45°50′16″N 66°26′12″W	
HMCS Brunswicker	Saint John	Canada	Royal Canadian Navy	1923–present	45.27153°N 66.07576°W	
RCAF Station St John	Saint John	Canada	Royal Canadian Air Force	1941–1944	45.300°N 66.100°W	
RCAF Station St. Margarets	St. Margarets	Canada	Royal Canadian Air Force	1953–1988	46.90903°N 65.2092°W	

== Newfoundland and Labrador ==
Name	Location	Operator	Branch	Date	Coordinates	Ref
Allan's Island Radar Station	Allan's Island	(United States) USA	United States Army	1943–1945	46°50′52″N 55°48′17″W	
Anti-Motor Torpedo Boat Battery–Black Point	Black Point	(United States) USA	Coast Artillery Corps	1941–1945	47°11′40″N 54°02′25″W	
Anti-Motor Torpedo Boat Battery–Ship Harbour	Ship Harbour	(United States) USA	Coast Artillery Corps	1941–1945	47°21′09″N 53°55′36″W	
Argentia Nuclear Weapons Storage Complex	Argentia	(United States) USA	Submarine Force Atlantic	1968–1994	47°17′26″N 53°58′37″W	
Battery 282	McAndrew	(United States) USA	United States Army	1941–1945	47°16′25″N 53°59′23″W	
Battle Harbour LORAN-A	Battle Harbour	Canada	Royal Canadian Navy	1942–1983	52°14′52″N 55°36′41″W	
Beaumont Hamel Armoury	Grand Falls	Canada	Canadian Army	1950–present	48°56′08″N 55°39′36″W	
Bell Island Battery	Bell Island	(United States) USA	United States Army	1943–1945	47°37′49″N 52°55′36″W	
Big Bay Radar Site	Labrador	Canada	NORAD	1992–present	55°44′19″N 60°25′47″W	
Border Beacon	Labrador	(United States) USA	United States Air Force	1958–1965	55°19′58″N 63°12′51″W	
Brig Harbour Radar Station	Brig Harbour Island	Canada	Royal Canadian Air Force	1942–1945	54°32′44″N 57°10′23″W	
Cambrai Armoury	Stephenville	Canada	Canadian Army	1950–present	48°32′52″N 58°33′32″W	
Cambrai Rifle Range	Makinsons	Canada	Canadian Army	1975–present	47°29′30″N 53°20′11″W	
Camp Alexander	St. John's	(United States) USA	United States Army Air Forces	1941–1942	47°34′35″N 52°43′03″W	
Canadian Coastal Radar–Gander	Gander	Canada	Royal Canadian Air Force	1991–present	48°56′37″N 54°34′56″W	
Cape Bonavista LORAN-A	Cape Bonavista	Canada	Royal Canadian Navy	1942–2012	48°41′48″N 53°05′18″W	
Cape Bonavista High-Frequency Surface-Wave Radar	Cape Bonavista	Canada	Royal Canadian Air Force	1999–2007	48°41′47″N 53°05′17″W	
Cape Bauld Radar Station	Quirpon Island	Canada	Royal Canadian Air Force	1942–1945	51°38′10″N 55°25′49″W	
Cape Kakiviak Radar Site	Torngat Mountains	Canada	NORAD	1992–present	59°59′15″N 64°09′55″W	
Cape Kiglapait Radar Site	Kiglapait Mountains	Canada	NORAD	1992–present	57°08′07″N 61°28′32″W	
Cape Makkovik Air Station	Cape Makkovik	(United States) USA	United States Air Force	1957–1961	55°13′30″N 59°08′45″W	
Cape Race LORAN-C	Cape Race	(United States) USA	United States Coast Guard	1965–2012	46°46′33″N 53°10′28″W	
Cape Race High-Frequency Surface-Wave Radar	Cape Race	Canada	Royal Canadian Air Force	1999–2007	46°46′34″N 53°10′29″W	
Cape Ray Radar Station	Table Mountain	Canada	Royal Canadian Air Force	1942–1945	47°42′39″N 59°13′36″W	
Cape Spear Radar Station	Cape Spear	(United States) USA	United States Army	1943–1945	47°31′25″N 52°37′10″W	
Cartwright Air Station	Cartwright	(United States) USA	United States Air Force	1952–1968	53°43′28″N 56°57′51″W	
Cartwright Radar Site	Cartwright	Canada	NORAD	1998–present	53°33′04″N 56°49′48″W	
Castle Hill	Placentia	France	French Army	1662–1713	47°15′04″N 53°58′17″W	
CFB Gander	Gander	Canada	Royal Canadian Air Force	1941–present	48°56′13″N 54°34′05″W	
CFB Goose Bay	Happy Valley-Goose Bay	Canada	Royal Canadian Air Force	1941–present	53°19′09″N 60°25′33″W	
CFS Saglek	Saglek Bay	Canada	NORAD	1988–present	58°29′01″N 62°40′07″W	
CFS St. John's	St. John's	Canada	Royal Canadian Navy	1949–present	47°34′59″N 52°41′38″W	
Comfort Cove LORAN-C	Comfort Cove	(United States) USA	United States Coast Guard	1966–2012	49°19′54″N 54°51′43″W	
Cut Throat Island Air Station	Cut Throat Island	(United States) USA	United States Air Force	1957–1961	54°29′47″N 57°08′00″W	
Elliston Ridge Air Station	Bonavista Peninsula	(United States) USA	United States Air Force	1957–1961	48°37′33″N 53°03′31″W	
Elliston Ridge Radar Station	Bonavista Peninsula	(United States) USA	United States Army	1943–1945	48°37′38″N 53°03′27″W	
Ernest Harmon Air Force Base	Stephenville	(United States) USA	United States Air Force	1942–1976	48°32′38″N 58°33′12″W	
FRD-10 Wullenweber	Gander	Canada	Communications Security Establishment	1971–present	48°57′04″N 54°31′31″W	
Fire Control Station No. 11	White Hills	(United States) USA	United States Army	1943–1945	47°35′10″N 52°40′20″W	
Fire Control Station No. 12	Logy Bay	(United States) USA	United States Army	1943–1945	47°38′48″N 52°39′41″W	
Fire Control Station No. 16	Flatrock	(United States) USA	United States Army	1943–1945	47°42′06″N 52°41′58″W	
Fogo Island Radar Station	Fogo Island	(United States) USA	United States Army	1943–1945	49°42′32″N 54°04′19″W	
Fort Amherst	St. John's	Great Britain	British Army	1770–1945	47°33′49″N 52°40′49″W	
Fort Baie-Château	Chateau Bay	France	French Army	1740–1763	52°00′19″N 55°51′59″W	
Fort Baie-Rouge	Red Bay	France	French Army	1713–1763	51°43′43″N 56°25′18″W	
Fort Chain Rock	Signal Hill	(United States) USA	United States Army	1941–1945	47°34′03″N 52°41′14″W	
Fort Ferryland	Ferryland	England	Royal Navy	1620–1673	47°01′25″N 52°53′03″W	
Fort Frederick	Placentia	Great Britain	British Army	1721–1746	47°14′57″N 53°57′42″W	
Fort McAndrew	Argentia	(United States) USA	United States Army	1941–1946	47°17′17″N 53°58′51″W	
Fort Plaisance	Placentia	France	French Army	1662–1713	47°15′10″N 53°58′05″W	
Fort Point	Trinity	Great Britain	British Army	1744–1820	48°21′55″N 53°20′42″W	
Fort Grand Saint-Modet	West St. Modeste	France	French Army	1732–1848	51°35′22″N 56°42′28″W	
Fort Royal	Placentia	France	French Army	1687–1713	47°15′04″N 53°58′17″W	
Fort Saint Louis	Placentia	France	French Army	1690–1713	47°15′05″N 53°57′52″W	
Fort Townshend	St. John's	Great Britain	British Army	1775–1871	47°33′58″N 52°42′40″W	
Fort Waldegrave	St. John's	Great Britain	British Army	1798–1871	47°34′08″N 52°41′27″W	
Fort William	St. John's	England	Royal Navy	1698–1871	47°34′15″N 52°42′02″W	
Fort York	Henley Harbour	Great Britain	British Army	1766–1796	52°00′18″N 55°51′58″W	
Fox Harbour Air Station	St. Lewis	(United States) USA	United States Air Force	1957–1961	52°22′12″N 55°39′52″W	
Fox Harbour LORAN-C	St. Lewis	(United States) USA	United States Coast Guard	1966–2012	52°22′35″N 55°42′29″W	
Gallipoli Armoury	Corner Brook	Canada	Canadian Army	1950–present	48°56′45″N 57°55′59″W	
Goose Air Defense Sector	Goose Bay	(United States) USA	Aerospace Defense Command	1960–1966	53°19′33″N 60°24′56″W	
Goose Air Force Base	Happy Valley-Goose Bay	(United States) USA	United States Air Force	1941–1994	53°19′36″N 60°24′54″W	
Goose Air Weapons Range	Labrador	Canada	Royal Canadian Air Force	1977–present	52°17′20″N 60°57′14″W	
Goose Nuclear Weapons Storage Complex	Happy Valley-Goose Bay	(United States) USA	Strategic Air Command	1953–1974	53°17′44″N 60°22′37″W	
Harbor Defenses of St. John's	St. John's	(United States) USA	United States Army	1941–1945	47°35′10″N 52°41′31″W	
HMC Dockyard Bay Bulls	Bay Bulls	Canada	Royal Canadian Navy	1940–1948	47°18′57″N 52°48′37″W	
HMCS Cabot	St. John's	Canada	Royal Canadian Navy	1949–present	47°33′33″N 52°42′12″W	
HMCS Caribou	Corner Brook	Canada	Royal Canadian Navy	1953–1958	48°57′30″N 57°56′34″W	
HMS Calypso	St. John's	Dominion of Newfoundland	Newfoundland Naval Reserve	1902–1922	49°17′42″N 55°01′06″W	
HMS Wireless Station–St. John's	Mount Pearl	United Kingdom	Royal Navy	1915–1949	47°30′17″N 52°47′41″W	
Hopedale Air Station	Hopedale	(United States) USA	United States Air Force	1953–1968	55°27′59″N 60°13′47″W	
La Scie Air Station	La Scie	(United States) USA	United States Air Force	1957–1961	49°58′50″N 55°31′48″W	
Lewisport Battery	Bay of Exploits	(United States) USA	United States Army	1943–1945	49°14′40″N 55°03′17″W	
Manuels Battery	Conception Bay	(United States) USA	United States Army	1943–1945	47°31′52″N 52°57′24″W	
McAndrew Air Force Base	Argentia	(United States) USA	United States Air Force	1948–1955	47°17′05″N 53°59′21″W	
Melville Air Station	Dome Mountain	(United States) USA	United States Air Force	1953–1988	53°17′45″N 60°32′23″W	
Mid-Canada Line	Labrador	Canada	Royal Canadian Air Force	1956–1965	55°18′07″N 66°42′18″W	
Naval Station Argentia	Argentia	(United States) USA	United States Navy	1941–1994	47°18′22″N 53°59′24″W	
Northeast Arm Naval Camp	Dunville	(United States) USA	United States Navy	1943–1994	47°16′13″N 53°51′01″W	
Pepperrell Air Force Base	St. John's	(United States) USA	United States Air Force	1941–1961	47°35′10″N 52°41′31″W	
Phillip's Head Battery	Bay of Exploits	(United States) USA	United States Army	1943–1945	49°13′29″N 55°18′06″W	
Pole Vault	St. John's	Canada	Royal Canadian Air Force	1955–1975	47°35′12″N 52°41′33″W	
Port aux Basques Radar Station	Port aux Basques	Canada	Royal Canadian Air Force	1942–1945	47°34′14″N 59°09′04″W	
Queen's Battery	St. John's	United Kingdom	British Army	1796–1871	47°34′07″N 52°41′09″W	
Quidi Vidi Battery	Quidi Vidi	France	French Army	1762–1762	47°34′49″N 52°40′25″W	
RAF(U) Goose Bay	Happy Valley-Goose Bay	United Kingdom	Royal Air Force	1942–2005	53°18′34″N 60°24′22″W	
RCAF Aerodrome Torbay	St. John's	Canada	Royal Canadian Air Force	1941–1961	47°37′07″N 52°45′09″W	
RCAF Saglek	Saglek Bay	Canada	Royal Canadian Air Force	1970–1986	58°28′28″N 62°39′15″W	
RCAF Station Botwood	Bay of Exploits	Canada	Royal Canadian Air Force	1937–1946	49°09′25″N 55°20′08″W	
Red Cliff Air Station	Logy Bay	(United States) USA	United States Air Force	1953–1961	47°38′20″N 52°40′02″W	
Royal Navy Air Section Argentia	Argentia	United Kingdom	Fleet Air Arm	1943–1944	47°18′39″N 53°59′21″W	
Saglek Air Station	Saglek Bay	(United States) USA	United States Air Force	1953–1970	58°29′19″N 62°35′08″W	
Saint Anthony Air Station	St. Anthony	(United States) USA	United States Air Force	1953–1968	51°20′57″N 55°36′39″W	
Smith's Battery	Bois Island	Great Britain	Royal Navy	1743–1784	47°01′38″N 52°51′51″W	
Spotted Island Air Station	Spotted Island	(United States) USA	United States Air Force	1957–1961	53°31′05″N 55°44′56″W	
St. Bride's Radar Station	St. Bride's	(United States) USA	United States Army	1943–1945	46°55′55″N 54°10′49″W	
STADAN	Shoe Cove	(United States) USA	NASA	1960–1983	47°44′28″N 52°43′15″W	
Stephenville Air Station	Stephenville	(United States) USA	United States Air Force	1951–1971	48°35′21″N 58°39′58″W	
T8503 Battery	Port Harmon	(United States) USA	Coast Artillery Corps	1941–1945	48°31′53″N 58°33′26″W	
Torbay Battery	Torbay	Great Britain	British Army	1781–1795	47°39′35″N 52°43′59″W	
Tukialik Radar Site	Labrador	Canada	NORAD	1992–present	54°42′53″N 58°21′30″W	
VOUS (AM)	Argentia	(United States) USA	American Forces Network	1941–1994	47°17′58.6″N 53°56′50.9″W	
Weather Station Kurt	Martin Bay	Nazi Germany	Kriegsmarine	1943–1944	60°05′00″N 64°22′51″W	

== Northwest Territories ==
Name	Location	Operator	Branch	Date	Coordinates	Ref
CFNA HQ Yellowknife	Yellowknife	Canada	(Canada) Joint Operations Command	1970–present	62°27′21″N 114°22′31″W	
CFS Inuvik	Inuvik	Canada	Royal Canadian Air Force	1963–1986	68°24′52″N 133°46′12″W	

== Nova Scotia ==
Name	Location	Operator	Branch	Date	Coordinates	Ref
Camp Aldershot	Kentville	Canada	Canadian Army	1904–present	45°05′39″N 064°30′32″W	
Canadian Coastal Radar–Barrington	Baccaro	Canada	Royal Canadian Air Force	1990–present	43°27′08″N 65°28′19″W	
Canadian Coastal Radar–Sydney	Lingan Road	Canada	Royal Canadian Air Force	1991–present	46°10′02″N 60°09′51″W	
CFS Barrington	Baccaro	Canada	Royal Canadian Air Force	1957–1990	43°27′06″N 065°28′17″W	
CFB Cornwallis	Deep Brook	Canada	Royal Canadian Navy	1942–1995	44.6533°N 65.6293°W	
CFB Greenwood	Annapolis Valley	Canada	Royal Canadian Air Force	1942–present	44°59′03″N 064°55′03″W	
CFB Halifax	Halifax	Canada	Royal Canadian Navy	1910–present	44°39′24″N 63°33′45″W	
CFS Sydney	Lingan Road	Canada	Royal Canadian Air Force	1953–1990	46.16738°N 60.16469°W	
Loran Station Deming	Deming Island	Canada	Royal Canadian Navy	1942–1981	45°12′51″N 61°10′35″W	
Fort George	Halifax	(United Kingdom) UK	British Army	1828–1906	44°38′51″N 63°34′49″W	
FMF Cape Scott	Halifax	Canada	Royal Canadian Navy	1910–present	44°39′30″N 63°34′54″W	
HMCS Scotian	Halifax	Canada	Royal Canadian Navy	1925–present	44.65344°N 63.57825°W	
NRS Newport Corner	Brooklyn	Canada	Royal Canadian Navy	1942–present	44°58′4.09″N 63°59′3.44″W	
RCAF Station Beaverbank	Hants County	Canada	Royal Canadian Air Force	1954–1964	44.91353°N 63.72572°W	
Royal Naval Dockyard, Halifax	Halifax	UK	Royal Navy	1759–1905	44°39′24″N 63°34′45″W	
Shearwater Heliport	Shearwater	Canada	Royal Canadian Air Force	1918–present	44°38′14″N 063°30′08″W	
SGT Folly Lake	Wentworth	Canada	NATO	1982–2006	45°33′40″N 63°32′39″W	

== Nunavut ==
Name	Location	Operator	Branch	Date	Coordinates	Ref
Cambridge Bay LORAN-A	Cambridge Bay	(United States) USA	United States Coast Guard	1947–2013	69°06′53″N 105°00′56″W	
CFS Alert	Alert	Canada	Royal Canadian Air Force	1958–present	82°29′57″N 62°20′45″W	
Brevoort Island Radar Site	Brevoort Island	Canada	NORAD	1988–present	63.34°N 64.158056°W	
CFS Frobisher Bay	Iqaluit	Canada	Royal Canadian Air Force	1954–1966	63°45′00″N 68°33′00″W	
CFS Resolution Island	Resolution Island	Canada	Royal Canadian Air Force	1953–1961	61°35′42″N 64°38′31″W	
Nanisivik Naval Facility	Baffin Island	Canada	Royal Canadian Navy	2015–present	73°04′08″N 84°32′57″W	
RCAF Frobisher Bay	Iqaluit	Canada	Royal Canadian Air Force	1943–1963	63°45′24″N 68°33′22″W	
Resolution Island Radar Site	Resolution Island	Canada	NORAD	1991–present	61.5964°N 64.6383°W	

== Ontario ==
Name	Location	Operator	Branch	Date	Coordinates	Ref
Canadian Forces College	Toronto	Canada	Canadian Armed Forces	1943–present	43.742°N 79.414°W	
CFB Borden	Simcoe County	Canada	Royal Canadian Air Force	1916–present	44°16′18″N 079°54′45″W	
CFB Kingston	Kingston	Canada	Royal Canadian Air Force	1914–present	44°14′30″N 76°27′00″W	
CFB North Bay	North Bay	Canada	Royal Canadian Air Force	1951–present	46.357846°N 79.416477°W	
CFB Trenton	Quinte West	Canada	Royal Canadian Air Force	1931–present	44°07′09″N 077°31′42″W	
CFS Carp	Carp	Canada	Canadian Army	1962–1994	45°21′06″N 76°02′50″W	
CFS Leitrim	Leitrim	Canada	Communications and Electronics Branch	1941–present	45.336495°N 75.587504°W	
CFB Picton	Picton	Canada	Royal Canadian Air Force	1941–1969	43°59′30″N 77°08′30″W	
Fort York	Toronto	(United Kingdom) UK	British Army	1793–1870	43°38′20″N 79°24′13″W	
HMCS Cataraqui	Kingston	Canada	Royal Canadian Navy	1939–present	44.236369°N 76.4705321°W	
HMCS Griffon	Thunder Bay	Canada	Royal Canadian Navy	1937–present	48.44006°N 89.21991°W	
HMCS Hunter	Windsor	Canada	Royal Canadian Navy	1941–present	42.303299°N 83.07767°W	
HMCS Prevost	London	Canada	Royal Canadian Navy	1938–present	42.98010°N 81.25771°W	
HMCS Star	Hamilton	Canada	Royal Canadian Navy	1923–present	43.27468°N 79.85571°W	
HMCS York	Toronto	Canada	Royal Canadian Navy	1923–present	43.6342°N 79.4028°W	
Major-General George R. Pearkes Building	Ottawa	Canada	(Canada) Department of National Defence	1974–present	45.423339°N 75.68924°W	
Naval Shipyards, York	Toronto	(United Kingdom) UK	Provincial Marine	1798–1813	43°38′35″N 79°22′51″W	
NDHQ Carling	Ottawa	Canada	Canadian Armed Forces	2017–present	45°21′N 75°51′W	
4 Canadian Division Support Base Petawawa	Petawawa	Canada	Canadian Army	1905–present	45°54′36″N 77°17′24″W	
Royal Canadian Air Force Academy	Simcoe County	Canada	Royal Canadian Air Force	1994–present	44°16′19″N 79°53′55″W	
Royal Military College	Kingston	Canada	Canadian Armed Forces	1876–present	44°13′44″N 76°28′07″W	
Royal Naval Dockyard, Amherstburg	Amherstburg	(United Kingdom) UK	Provincial Marine	1796–1813	42°06′05″N 83°06′49″W	
Royal Naval Dockyard, Kingston	Kingston	(United Kingdom) UK	Provincial Marine	1788–1853	44°13′44″N 76°28′07″W	

== Prince Edward Island ==
Name	Location	Operator	Branch	Date	Coordinates	Ref
CFB Summerside	St. Eleanors	Canada	Royal Canadian Air Force	1941–1991	46°26′17″N 63°49′44″W	
HMCS Queen Charlotte	Charlottetown	Canada	Royal Canadian Navy	1923–present	46°14′13″N 63°07′02″W	
RCAF Station Charlottetown	Sherwood	Canada	Royal Canadian Air Force	1941–1946	46°16′50″N 63°07′25″W	
RCAF Station Mount Pleasant	Mount Pleasant	Canada	Royal Canadian Air Force	1940–	46°35′54″N 64°00′24″W	
Relief Landing Field-Wellington	Wellington	Canada	Royal Canadian Air Force	1941–1945	46°28′37″N 64°01′14″W	

== Quebec ==
Name	Location	Operator	Branch	Date	Coordinates	Ref
Citadelle of Quebec	Cap Diamant	Canada	Canadian Army	1820–present	46.8074°N 71.2071°W	
CFB Bagotville	Saguenay	Canada	Royal Canadian Air Force	1942–present	48°19′50″N 70°59′47″W	
2nd Canadian Division Support Base Valcartier	Saint-Gabriel-de-Valcartier	Canada	Canadian Army	1914–present	46°54′10″N 071°30′13″W	
HMCS Champlain	Chicoutimi	Canada	Royal Canadian Navy	1985–present	48.4302°N 71.0555°W	
HMCS d'Iberville	Rimouski	Canada	Royal Canadian Navy	1986–present	48.46689°N 68.50810°W	
HMCS Donnacona	Montreal	Canada	Royal Canadian Navy	1923–present	45°28′54″N 73°34′59″W	
HMCS Jolliet	Sept-Îles	Canada	Royal Canadian Navy	1989–present	50.2032°N 66.3844°W	
HMCS Montcalm	Quebec City	Canada	Royal Canadian Navy	1923–present	46°49′07″N 71°12′04″W	
HMCS Radisson	Trois-Rivières	Canada	Royal Canadian Navy	1986–present	46.3597°N 72.5324°W	
RCAF Station Great Whale River	Great Whale River	Canada	Royal Canadian Air Force	1955–1965	55°16′37″N 77°40′20″W	
RCAF Station St. Sylvestre	Saint-Sylvestre	Canada	Royal Canadian Air Force	1953–1964	46.3359°N 71.1416°W	
Royal Military College Saint-Jean	Fort Saint-Jean	Canada	Canadian Armed Forces	1952–present	45°17′49″N 73°15′09″W	

== Saskatchewan ==
Name	Location	Operator	Branch	Date	Coordinates	Ref
CFS Alsask	Alsask	Canada	Royal Canadian Air Force	1963–1986	51°23′31″N 110°00′10″W	
CFS Dana	Rural Municipality of Bayne No. 371	Canada	Royal Canadian Air Force	1962–1987	52°16′46″N 105°46′08″W	
CFB Moose Jaw	Moose Jaw	Canada	Royal Canadian Air Force	1941–present	50°19′49″N 105°33′33″W	
HMCS Queen	Regina	Canada	Royal Canadian Navy	1923–present	50°26′03″N 104°36′23″W	
HMCS Unicorn	Saskatoon	Canada	Royal Canadian Navy	1923–present	52°07′51″N 106°39′31″W	

== Yukon ==
Name	Location	Operator	Branch	Date	Coordinates	Ref
RCAF Station Whitehorse	Whitehorse	Canada	Royal Canadian Air Force	1942–1968	60°42′34″N 135°04′02″W	
CFNA HQ Whitehorse	Whitehorse	Canada	(Canada) Joint Operations Command	1970–present	60°35′57″N 134°57′08″W	

== See also ==
- List of armouries in Canada
- List of British Commonwealth Air Training Plan facilities in Canada
- List of United States military bases
