= Point Lonely Short Range Radar Site =

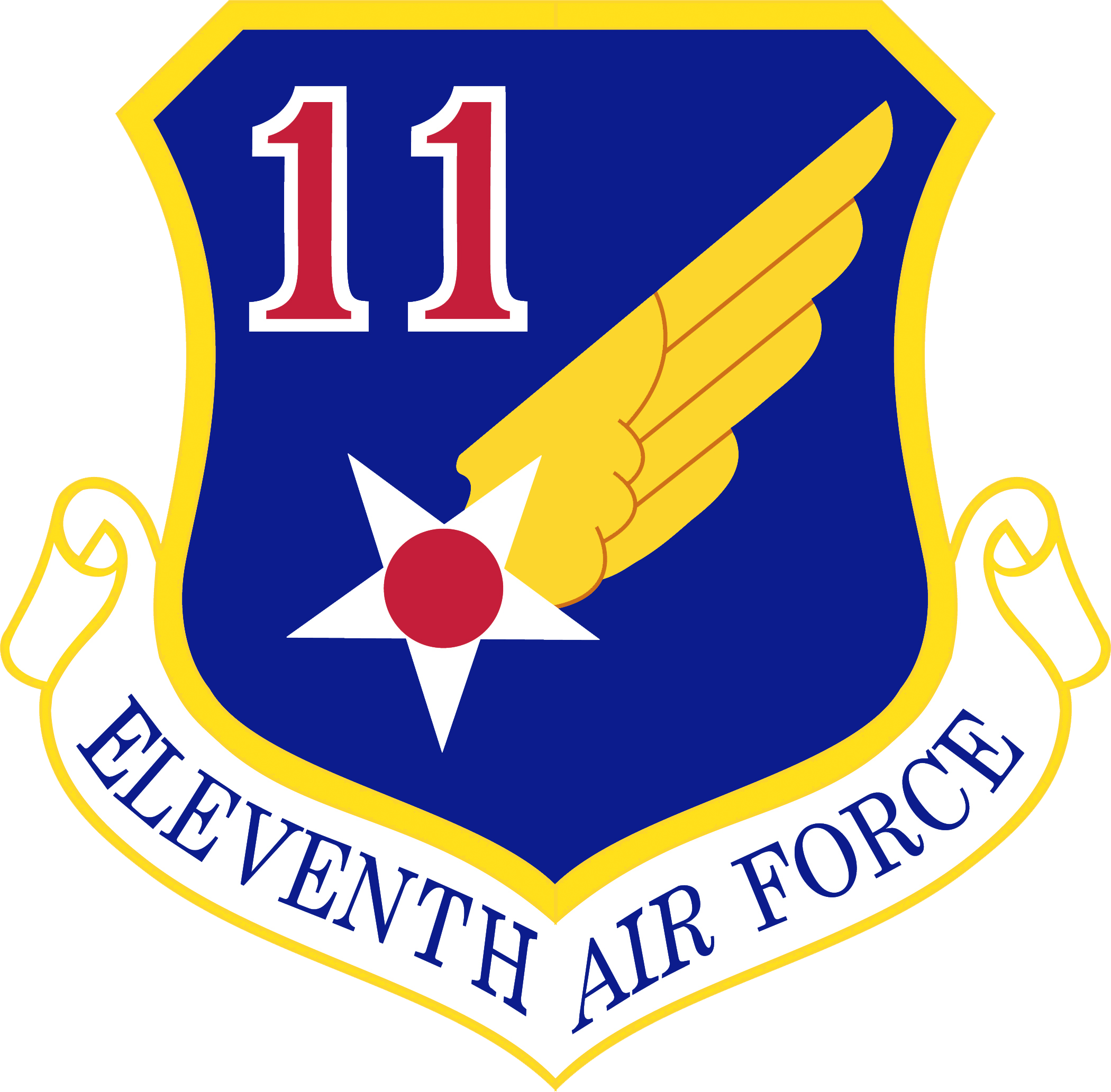
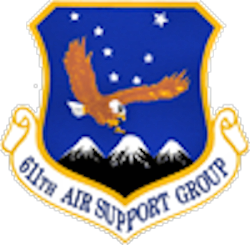
Point Lonely Short Range Radar Site Lonely Air Station
- IATA: LNI; ICAO: PALN; FAA LID: AK71

Summary
- Airport type: Military
- Owner: U.S. Air Force
- Location: North Slope Borough, Alaska
- Elevation AMSL: 17 ft / 5 m
- Coordinates: 70°54′39″N 153°14′32″W

Map
- Location of Point Lonely Short Range Radar Site

Runways
Direction	Length		Surface
Direction	ft	m	Surface
7/25	5,000	1,524	Gravel

Statistics (1977)
- Aircraft operations: 15,500
- Source: Federal Aviation Administration

Point Lonely Short Range Radar Site (IATA: LNI, ICAO: PALN, FAA LID: AK71) is a United States Air Force Short Range Radar Site located in the North Slope Borough of the U.S. state of Alaska, 84 miles (135 km) east-southeast of Point Barrow, Alaska. It is not open for public access.

== Facilities and aircraft ==
The facility contains a rough airstrip at an elevation of 17 feet (5 m) above mean sea level. It has one runway designated 7/25 with a gravel surface measuring 5,000 by 100 feet (1,524 x 30 m). According to the FAA, for the 12-month period ending July 12, 1977, it had 15,500 general aviation aircraft operations, an average of 42 per day. Husky Oil Company was making these flights in and out of Lonely. Many of the flights were L-188 Electra's and also a rare C-133 Cargomaster. Husky had to make improvements to the runway in order to accommodate these aircraft. There were also Hueys being flown in as well.

== History ==
The airstrip was built in 1957 to support the Distant Early Warning Line radar station at Point Lonely (POW-1). The station was logistically supported by the Point Barrow Main DEW Line Station (POW-MAIN). It was operated by civilian contract workers. DEW Line operations ceased in October 1990, and the personnel were relieved from their duties.

The radar station was upgraded with new radars and in 1994 was re-designated part of the North Warning System (NWS) as a Short Range Radar Site, A-18, equipped with a minimally attended AN/FPS-124 surveillance radar. In 1998 Pacific Air Forces initiated "Operation Clean Sweep", in which abandoned Cold War stations in Alaska were remediated and the land restored to its previous state. The site remediation of the radar and support station was carried out by the 611th Civil Engineering Squadron at Elmendorf AFB, and remediation work was completed by 2005.

The site is controlled by the Pacific Air Forces 611th Air Support Group, based at Elmendorf. The airstrip remains open to provide contractor support access to the military radar site.

== See also ==
- North Warning System
- Distant Early Warning Line
- Alaskan Air Command
- Eleventh Air Force
