= Lingan Road =

Community in Nova Scotia, Canada

Coordinates: 46°10′55.09″N 60°8′5.53″W

Lingan Road in Nova Scotia

Lingan Road is a community in the Canadian province of Nova Scotia, located in the Cape Breton Regional Municipality on Cape Breton Island.
