= Bray Island =

Island in Nunavut, Canada

- Bray Island, Nunavut.

- Location within Nunavut Location within Canada

Geography
- Location: Foxe Basin
- Coordinates: 69°16′N 77°00′W
- Archipelago: Arctic Archipelago
- Area: 689 km^{2} (266 sq mi)

Administration
- Canada
- Territory: Nunavut
- Region: Qikiqtaaluk

Demographics
- Population: Uninhabited

Bray Island is one of the Canadian Arctic islands located in Nunavut, Canada along the southern coast of Baffin Island. It is located in Foxe Basin, at 69°16′N 77°00′W, and has an area of 689 km^{2} (266 sq mi).

Bray Island was the home of FOX-A, a Distant Early Warning Line and now a North Warning System site. However, Bray Island has no permanent residents.
