= Aggijjat =

Island in Nunavut, Canada

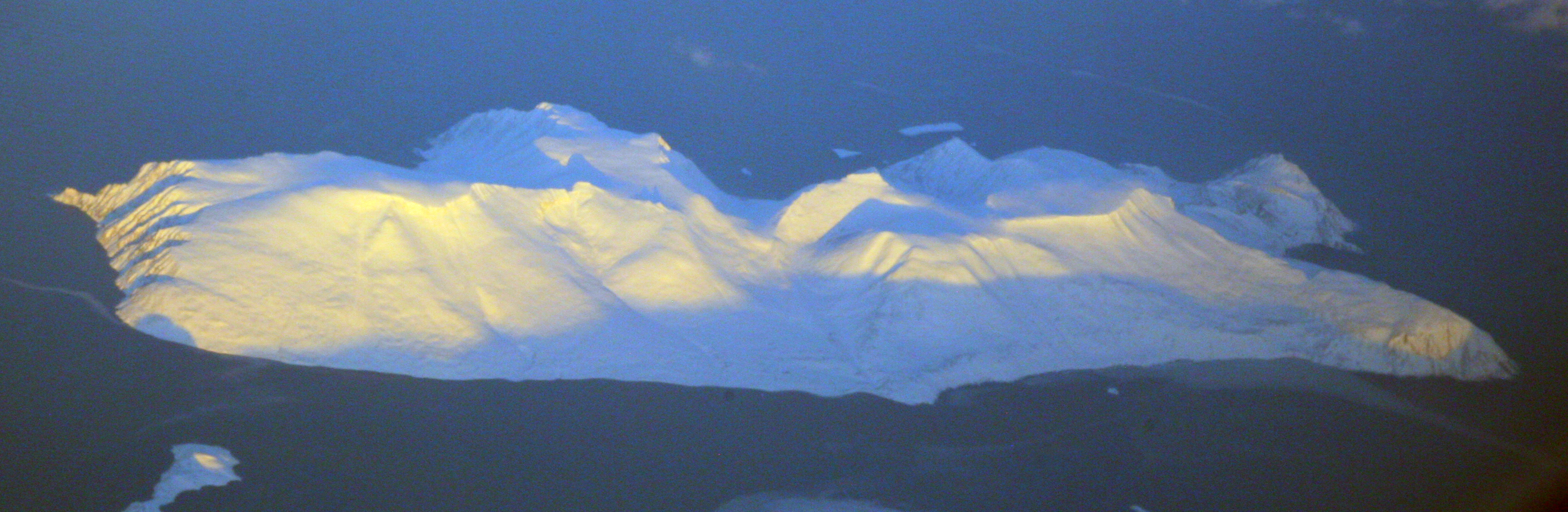
- Aerial photo of Aggijjat in 2014

- Location within Nunavut Location within Canada

Geography
- Location: Davis Strait
- Coordinates: 67°05′25″N 062°11′14″W
- Archipelago: Arctic Archipelago

Administration
- Canada
- Territory: Nunavut
- Region: Qikiqtaaluk

Demographics
- Population: Uninhabited

Aggijjat (Inuktitut syllabics: ᐊᒡᒋᔾᔭᑦ) formerly Durban Island is a Canadian Arctic island located in Nunavut, Canada. It is one of Baffin Island's northeast offshore islands within Davis Strait's Merchants Bay. It is 36 km^{2} (14 sq mi) in size. Durban Harbour is on the island's southeast facing side. Nearby can be found the larger Paallavvik, and Auyuittuq National Park is also to the west on Baffin Island.

== History ==
Durban Island (FOX-E) is a former Distant Early Warning Line and is currently a North Warning System site.

It is listed by the Contaminated Sites Directorate in Iqaluit as a contaminated site in need of future remediation.
