= Fort Point, Newfoundland and Labrador =

Fort Point Admiral's Point
- Location of Fort Point in Newfoundland
- Coordinates: 48°21′55″N 53°20′42″W
- Country: Canada
- Province: Newfoundland and Labrador
- Settled: 1744
- Time zone: UTC-3:30 (Newfoundland Time)
  - Summer (DST): UTC-2:30 (Newfoundland Daylight)
- Area code: 709

Fort Point, also known as Admiral's Point, is a point of land situated on the western shore to the entrance of Trinity Harbour, Trinity Bay, Newfoundland, Canada. The area was the site a fort which was located on the tip of the peninsula.

== History ==
Trinity, with its excellent harbour and close proximity to the fishing grounds, was often the target of French raids which required protection. The peninsula that jutted out into the natural harbour provided an ideal location for such a fort. It was the site of three military installations with the first in 1744 that housed fourteen twenty four pounder cannons facing the inner harbour with another four six pounders towards Salvage Head.

On July 17, 1762, the fort was surrendered to French commander Captain Chevalier de Boisgelin, who destroyed the buildings and most of the ordnance.

The second installation was in 1812, as protection against raids by American privateers. The third and final installation was in 1820 when it was commanded by Captain J.T. Nicholas of HMS Egeria.

The fortification was eventually abandoned and a lighthouse was erected on the site in 1871.

== See also ==
- Trinity Historical Society page with photos
