= CFS Saglek =

Canadian Forces Air Command radar base

Saglek Radar Site (LAB-6)
- Part of North Warning System
- Labrador, Canada
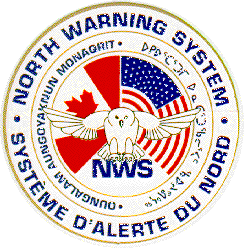

Site information
- Type: Long Range Radar Station
- Code: LAB-2
- Controlled by: North American Aerospace Defense Command

Location
- Coordinates: 58°29′19″N 062°35′08″W

Site history
- Built by: Royal Canadian Air Force
- In use: 1998-

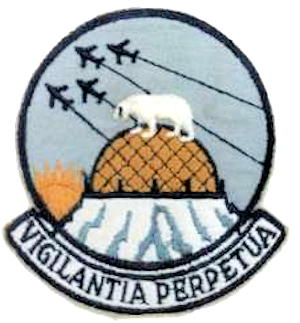
Saglek Air Station
- Part of Pinetree Line
- Labrador, Canada

Site information
- Type: Radar Station
- Code: N-29
- Controlled by: United States Air Force

Location
- Coordinates: 58°28′28″N 062°39′15″W

Site history
- Built: 1953
- Built by: United States Air Force
- In use: 1953-1970

Location of CFS Saglek, Labrador

Canadian Forces Station Saglek is a Royal Canadian Air Force radar base in the former Pinetree Line and currently part of the North Warning System, located near Saglek Bay in Newfoundland and Labrador, 367.7 miles (591.8 km) north-northwest of CFB Goose Bay.

== History ==
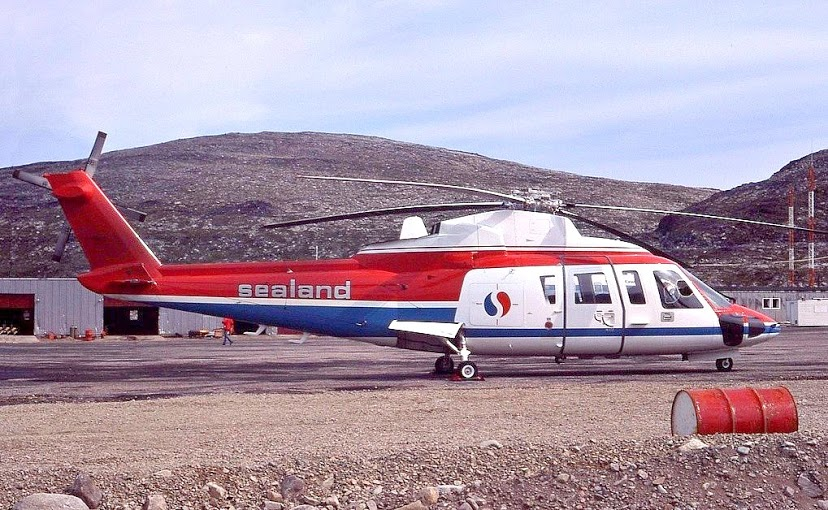
Sealand Helicopters S-76A at CFS Saglek

The site was established in 1953 as a General Surveillance Radar station. It was used initially by the United States Air Force, one of the many that would make up the Pinetree Line of Ground-Control Intercept (GCI) radar sites.

The Northeast Air Command, the 924th Aircraft Control and Radar Squadron on the station on 1 October 1953. Initial radars installed were AN/FPS-3C long Range Search Radar; AN/FPS-502 small surveillance radar, AN/FPS-87A general Surveillance and an AN/TPS-502 height finder radar.

As a GCI base, the 924th's role was to guide interceptor aircraft toward unidentified intruders picked up on the unit's radar scopes. These interceptors were assigned to the 64th Air Division at Goose AFB, Labrador. The station was reassigned to the USAF Air Defense Command on 1 April 1957, and was given designation "N-29".

In 1963, the site was connected to the Semi Automatic Ground Environment (SAGE) Data Centre (DC-31) at CFB Goose Bay, and the site was upgraded to an AN/FPS-93A and AN/TPS-502 radars. On 30 June 1971, the USAF transferred control of the site to the Canadian Forces, which closed the radar facility. On 1 August 1970, ADC Headquarters redesignated the 924th AC&W Squadron as OL AE, 4624th Support Squadron (SAGE). On 30 September 1970 the last of the USAF military personnel departed CFS Saglek.

Civilian personnel of the Canadian Marconi Company remained on-site to operate and support an associated Tropospheric scatter communications system, which was located approximately 3 miles inland of the radar site. The radar station was used as the living quarters for the Canadian Marconi staff, except for those located at the Lower Camp airfield for runway maintenance and snow clearing.

== North Warning System ==
A long range, phased array AN/FPS-117 3-dimensional air search surveillance radar and a doppler AN/FPS-124 short-range surveillance radar were installed in November 1989 as part of the North Warning System to cover any radar surveillance gaps. The new site (LAB-2) consists of a radar towers, communications facility, and storage and tunnel connected buildings for personnel.

== USAF units and assignments ==
Units:

- 924th Aircraft Control and Warning Squadron, Activated at Grenier AFB, New Hampshire 13 June 1953

Moved to Saglek Air Station, Labrador, 1 October 1953
Inactivated 30 June 1971

Assignments:

- 4707th Air Defense Wing, 25 May 1953
- 64th Air Division (NEAC), 1 October 1953
- 4732d Air Defense Group (ADC), 1 April 1957
- Goose Air Defense Sector, 1 April 1960
- 37th Air Division, 1 April 1966
- 21st Air Division, 31 March 1970 – 30 June 1971

== See also ==
- Saglek Airport
- Distant Early Warning Line
- Pinetree Line
- List of USAF Aerospace Defense Command General Surveillance Radar Stations

== References and notes ==
- A Handbook of Aerospace Defense Organization 1946 - 1980, by Lloyd H. Cornett and Mildred W. Johnson, Office of History, Aerospace Defense Center, Peterson Air Force Base, Colorado
- Winkler, David F. (1997), Searching the skies: the legacy of the United States Cold War defense radar program. Prepared for United States Air Force Headquarters Air Combat Command.
- Information for Saglek AS, NL
