= Cape Kakiviak Short Range Radar Site =

Royal Canadian Air Force Short Range Radar Site in Newfoundland and Labrador

Cape Kakiviak Radar Site (LAB-1)
- Part of North Warning System
- Labrador, Canada
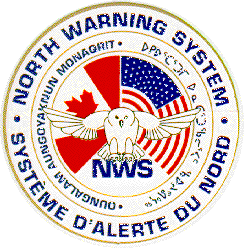

Site information
- Type: Short Range Radar Station
- Code: LAB-1
- Controlled by: North American Aerospace Defense Command

Location
- Coordinates: 59°59′15″N 064°09′55″W

Site history
- Built: July 1992
- Built by: Royal Canadian Air Force
- In use: 1992-present

Location of Cape Kakiviak (LAB-1), Labrador

Cape Kakiviak Short Range Radar Site (LAB-1) is a Royal Canadian Air Force Short Range Radar Site located in the Torngat Mountains of northern Labrador, 505 miles (813 km) north of CFB Goose Bay, Newfoundland and Labrador.

== Facilities ==
The facility contains a Short Range AN/FPS-124 doppler airborne target surveillance radar that was installed in July 1992 as part of the North Warning System. The site (LAB-1) also consists of radar towers, communications facility, and storage and tunnel connected buildings for personnel.

== See also ==
- North Warning System
- Pinetree Line
