= Cape Kiglapait Short Range Radar Site =

Royal Canadian Air Force Short Range Radar Site in Newfoundland and Labrador

Cape Kiglapait Radar Site (LAB-3)
- Part of North Warning System
- Labrador, Canada
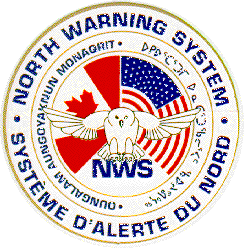

Site information
- Type: Short Range Radar Station
- Code: LAB-3
- Controlled by: North American Aerospace Defense Command

Location
- Coordinates: 57°08′07″N 061°28′32″W

Site history
- Built: August 1992
- Built by: Royal Canadian Air Force
- In use: 1992-present

Location of Cape Kiglapait (LAB-3), Labrador

Cape Kiglapait Short Range Radar Site (LAB-3) is a Royal Canadian Air Force Short Range Radar Site located in the Kiglapait Mountains of Labrador, 268 miles (431 km) north of CFB Goose Bay, Newfoundland and Labrador.

== Facilities ==
The facility contains a Short Range AN/FPS-124 doppler airborne target surveillance radar that was installed in August 1992 as part of the North Warning System. The site (LAB-3) also consists of radar towers, communications facility, and storage and tunnel connected buildings for personnel.

== See also ==
- North Warning System
- Pinetree Line
