= VOUS (AM) =

- Argentia, Newfoundland; Canada
- Broadcast area: Naval Station Argentia
- Frequency: 1480 kHz

Programming
- Format: Full-service/community radio

Ownership
- Owner: American Forces Network

History
- First air date: July 20, 1941
- Call sign meaning: Voice of United States

Technical information
- Class: C
- Power: 50 watts day
- Transmitter coordinates: 47°17′58.6″N 53°56′50.9″W

VOUS was a radio station which operated on 1480 kHz AM in Argentia, Newfoundland, Canada. Broadcasting began in 1941 for Naval Air Station Argentia; the station was owned by the American Forces Network and operated by the United States Navy. In 1941, VOUS added a rebroadcaster at St. John's for Pepperrell Air Force Base; it was decommissioned in 1961.

== History ==
The station was established in 1941 by United States Navy, initially with effective radiated power of 50 watts. The station utilized a BC-250-GY Gates transmitter atop a 45.6-metre guyed lattice steel mast insulated against ground.

=== Closure ===
The licence for VOUS was revoked at the request of the licensee and left the air in 1994.

== Rebroadcasters ==
Rebroadcasters of VOUS
City of licence	Identifier	Frequency	RECNet	Notes
St. John's	VOUS	1480 FM	Query	Pepperrell Air Force Base
