= Brevoort Island =

Uninhabited island in Nunavut, Canada

- The charter vessel Eskimo is escorted out of Brevoort Island by the CCGS Narwhal.

- Location within Nunavut Location within Canada

Geography
- Location: Northern Canada
- Coordinates: 63°30′15″N 64°20′00″W
- Archipelago: Arctic Archipelago
- Area: 271 km^{2} (105 sq mi)

Administration
- Canada
- Territory: Nunavut
- Region: Qikiqtaaluk

Demographics
- Population: Uninhabited

Brevoort Island is a small, uninhabited island located in the Davis Strait off the eastern coast of Baffin Island in the Qikiqtaaluk Region of northern Canada's territory of Nunavut. The island is a member of the Arctic Archipelago and lies north of Cape Murchison, opposite the Cumberland Peninsula.

== Geography and climate ==
Brevoort Island, with an area of 271 km^{2} (105 sq mi), is 46 km (29 mi) in length, and 5–7 km (3.1–4.3 mi) in width. It has a hilly interior, mostly composed of granite.

Brevoort Island has a tundra climate (Köppen: ETf; Trewartha: Ftkc)

Climate data for Brevoort Island WMO ID: 71097; Climate ID: 2400565; coordinates 63°20′23″N 64°08′45″W; elevation: 376 m (1,234 ft); 1991–2020 normals, extremes 1959–present
Month	Jan	Feb	Mar	Apr	May	Jun	Jul	Aug	Sep	Oct	Nov	Dec	Year
Record high humidex	−1.1	2.2	−0.6	5.0	8.1	18.0	20.7	20.0	17.1	6.7	0.2	−0.3	20.7
Record high °C (°F)	0.1 (32.2)	2.2 (36.0)	0.2 (32.4)	6.1 (43.0)	13.7 (56.7)	17.2 (63.0)	22.0 (71.6)	21.6 (70.9)	16.7 (62.1)	7.8 (46.0)	1.3 (34.3)	0.0 (32.0)	22.0 (71.6)
Mean daily maximum °C (°F)	−18.8 (−1.8)	−20.0 (−4.0)	−16.2 (2.8)	−9.7 (14.5)	−2.8 (27.0)	3.1 (37.6)	8.3 (46.9)	7.8 (46.0)	2.3 (36.1)	−2.5 (27.5)	−7.1 (19.2)	−12.8 (9.0)	−5.7 (21.7)
Daily mean °C (°F)	−21.2 (−6.2)	−22.5 (−8.5)	−19.0 (−2.2)	−12.2 (10.0)	−4.9 (23.2)	1.0 (33.8)	5.6 (42.1)	5.4 (41.7)	0.6 (33.1)	−4.1 (24.6)	−9.2 (15.4)	−15.1 (4.8)	−8.0 (17.6)
Mean daily minimum °C (°F)	−23.6 (−10.5)	−25.0 (−13.0)	−21.7 (−7.1)	−14.8 (5.4)	−6.9 (19.6)	−1.2 (29.8)	2.8 (37.0)	2.8 (37.0)	−1.1 (30.0)	−5.8 (21.6)	−11.2 (11.8)	−17.4 (0.7)	−10.3 (13.5)
Record low °C (°F)	−37.3 (−35.1)	−40.6 (−41.1)	−38.3 (−36.9)	−31.7 (−25.1)	−20.0 (−4.0)	−11.1 (12.0)	−6.1 (21.0)	−6.1 (21.0)	−10.1 (13.8)	−20.6 (−5.1)	−27.8 (−18.0)	−34.8 (−30.6)	−40.6 (−41.1)
Record low wind chill	−57.5	−63.1	−54.2	−45.3	−31.7	−20.1	−13.8	−13.2	−17.3	−34.0	−43.9	−52.6	−63.1
Source: Environment and Climate Change Canada Canadian Climate Normals 1991–2020

== Military use ==
The island is the home of BAF-3, a North Warning System Long Range Radar site. Before the transition to the NWS it functioned as a rearward communications (relay) station for the Distant Early Warning Line, designated as RES-X-1
