= North Warning System =

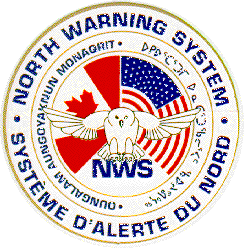
- Active: 1988–present
- Country: Canada & United States
- Branch: Royal Canadian Air Force; United States Air Force
- Type: Early-warning radar
- Role: Continental Air Defense
- Part of: North American Aerospace Defense Command
- Garrison/HQ: CFB North Bay; Joint Base Elmendorf-Richardson

The North Warning System (NWS, French: Système d'alerte du nord) is a joint United States and Canadian early-warning radar system for the atmospheric air defense of North America. It provides surveillance of airspace from potential incursions or attacks from across North America's polar region. It replaced the Distant Early Warning Line system in the late 1980s.

== Overview ==
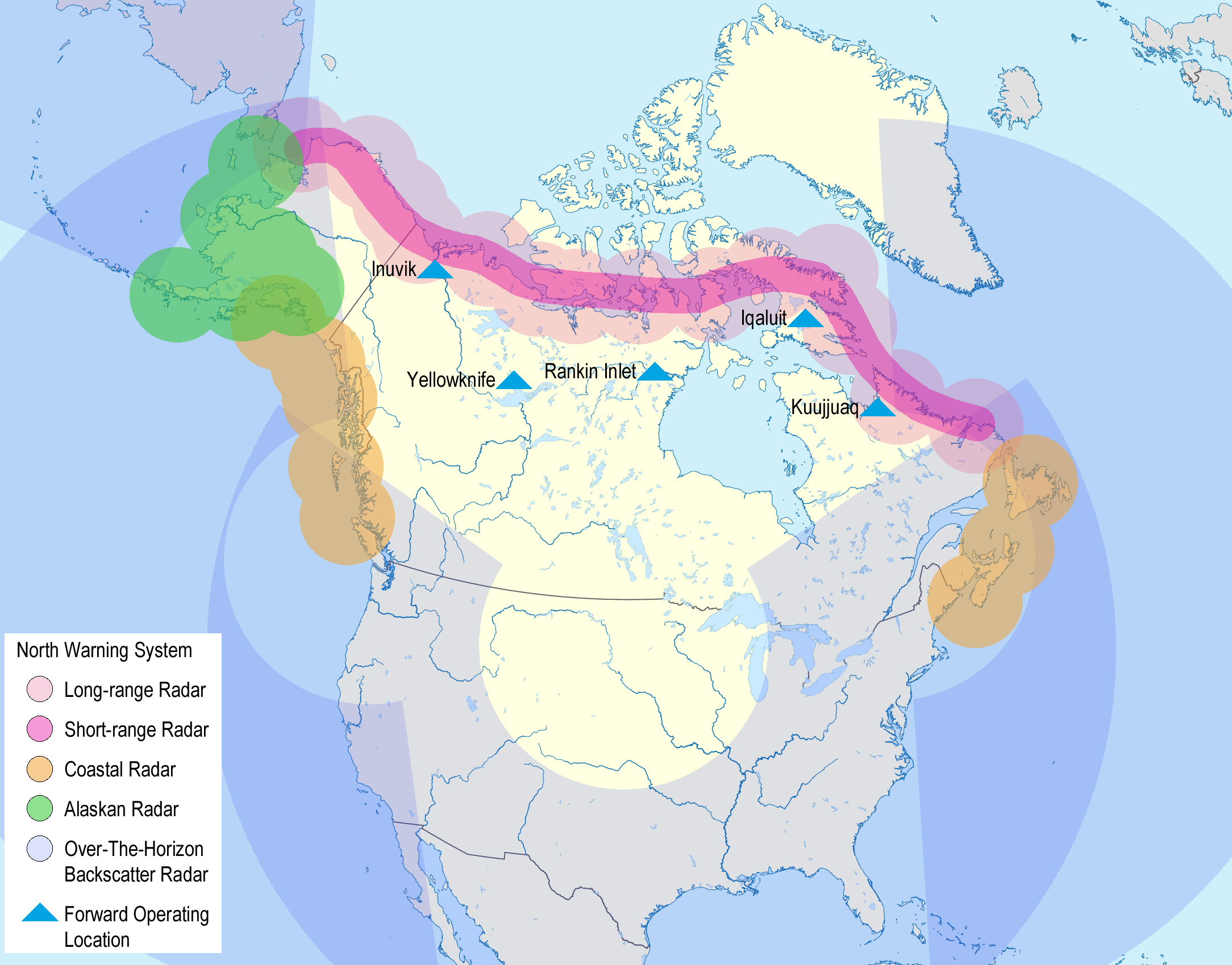
The North Warning System as part of NORAD radar array as envisioned by Canada and the US in 1987.

The NWS consists of both long range AN/FPS-117 and short range AN/FPS-124 surveillance radars, operated and maintained by North American Aerospace Defense Command (NORAD). There are 13 long range sites and 36 short range sites.

In Canada, the station sites are owned or leased by the Government of Canada, which also owns most of the infrastructure. The radars and tactical radios are owned by the United States Air Force. The Alaska Regional Operations Control Center (ROCC) at Elmendorf AFB, Alaska controls the stations in Alaska. The Canada East and Canada West Regional Operations Control Centres (ROCCs) at CFB North Bay, Ontario control the stations in Canada. ROCC information is then passed to the NORAD Combat Operations Centre (COC) at Colorado Springs, Colorado.

Each Long Range site consists of accommodation buildings, radar towers and radomes, generator and fuel systems, satellite terminals, automated weather station, and UHF and VHF ground-air-ground radio. Short Range sites consist of a single AN/FPS-124 radar, satellite terminals, power generation and fuel systems, and a small emergency shelter that can accommodate six people. Some short range stations lack weather stations and UHF Tactical Radios.

== History ==
The Distant Early Warning (DEW) Line, constructed in the late 1950s, was reaching obsolescence in the 1980s. With the signing of North American Air Defence Modernization agreement at the "Shamrock Summit" between Prime Minister Mulroney and President Reagan in Quebec City on 18 March 1985, the DEW Line began its eventual upgrading and transition becoming the North Warning System (NWS) of today.

The NWS began limited operation in 1988 with the commissioning and acceptance of the three newly constructed east coast sites BAF-3 Brevoort Island, Nunavut, LAB-2 Saglek and LAB-6 Cartwright, both in Labrador. Throughout the late 1980s and early 1990s, new NWS LRR radars replaced former DEW Line sites. DEW sites that were not transitioned to North Warning operation were eventually closed down. The official activation of the NWS and inactivation of the DEW Line took place on 15 July 1993.

The bi-national North Warning System Office (NWSO) is located in Ottawa, Ontario and staffed with both Canadian and American military and civilian personnel. Staffed sites are operated by the Royal Canadian Air Force, but physically staffed by civilian contractors. Logistical and maintenance support for the NWS is supplied by the Air Force Materiel Command of the United States Air Force, located at Ogden Air Logistics Center (OO-ALC), Hill Air Force Base, Utah.

== Site remediation ==
The former DEW Line sites were operated using practices and materials accepted by the environmental standards of the time. With their closure and many of them rebuilt as NWS sites, a clean-up project was undertaken to remove surplus infrastructure, treat chemically contaminated soils, and stabilize landfill sites. The clean-up was designed to keep chemical contamination from the DEW Line sites out of the Arctic food chain, and ensure that the sites are restored to an environmentally safe condition. In 1989, the Canadian Department of National Defence (DND) started investigating the environmental conditions of the DEW Line sites and commenced clean-up work at two sites in 1996. The clean-up of 21 sites was scheduled to be completed in 2013. In March 2014 DND announced the remediation project was complete.

== Stations ==
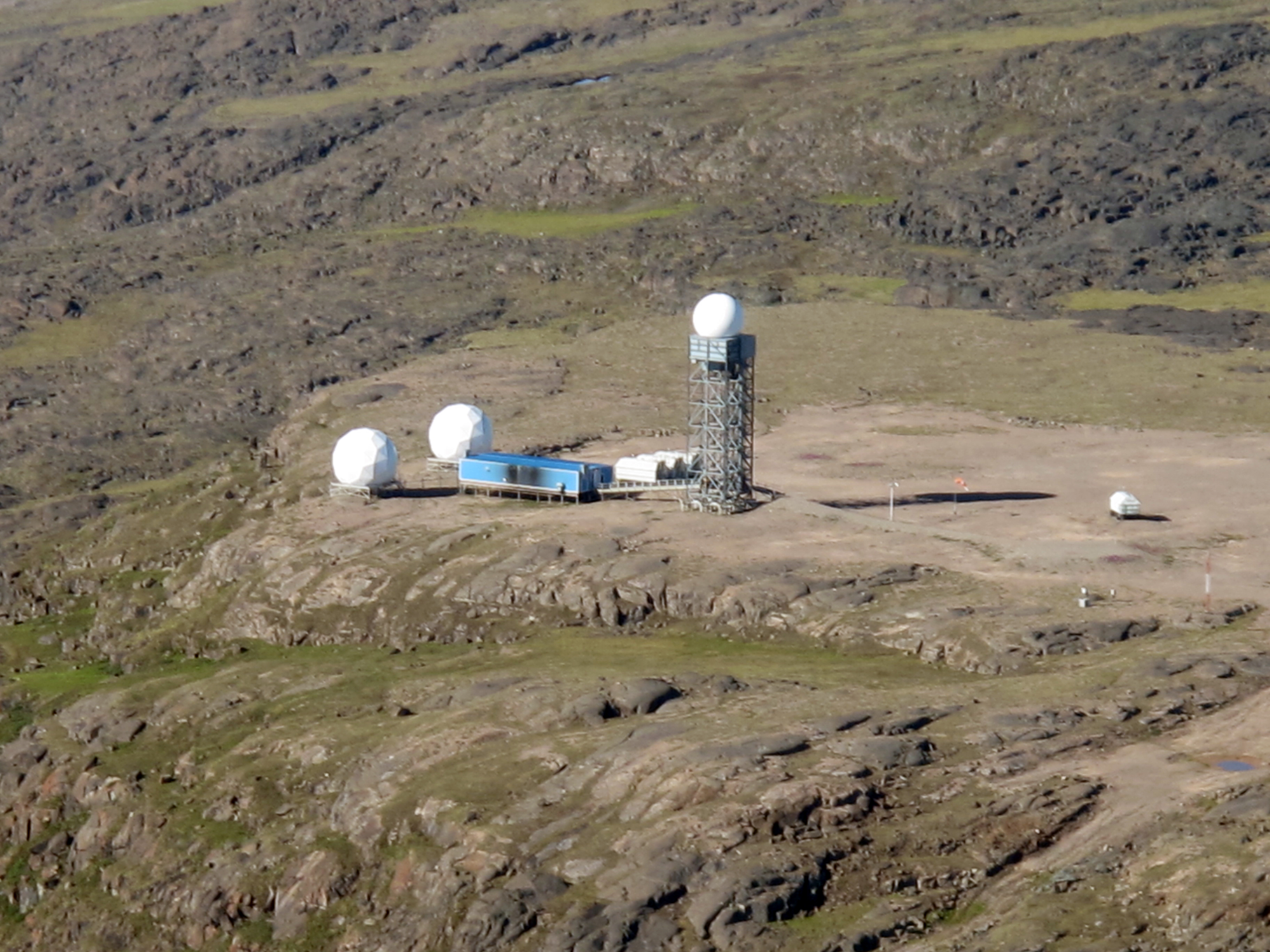
PIN-DA Short Range Radar site, Edinburgh Island, Nunavut

The NWS consists of 15 long-range radars (11 in Canada, of which eight were DEW Line sites) and 39 short-range radars (36 in Canada). The system forms a 4,800 km (2,983 mi) long and 320 km (199 mi) wide "tripwire" stretching from Alaska to southern Labrador. Minimally-attended NWS Long Range Radar AN/FPS-117 radar sites shaded in blue.

Site ID	Geographic Place Name	Location	Radar	Coordinates	Activated	Deactivated	Notes
LIZ-2	Point Lay	AK	FPS-124	69°01′27″N 163°51′26″W	1955	1994	Established as DEW Line Auxiliary site, 1955. Also was part of Alaska Radar System, site A-15. DEW operations ended 1989; unattended NWS Short Range Radar installed 1990 to cover any Long Range Radar surveillance gaps; Site deactivated 1994 and remediation work was completed by 2005. Gravel runway and building pads remain. See also: Point Lay LRRS Airport (ICAO: PPIZ)
LIZ-3	Wainwright	AK	FPS-124	70°36′37″N 159°52′12″W	1955	2007	Established as DEW Line Auxiliary site, 1955. Also was part of Alaska Radar System, site A-16. DEW operations ended 1995; minimally-attended NWS Short Range Radar installed 1994; Former DEW station remediation work was completed by 2005. Site deactivated 2007 due to soil erosion & budget concerns. See also: Wainwright Airport (ICAO: PAWI)
POW-M	Point Barrow	AK	FPS-117	71°19′38″N 156°38′10″W	1957	Active	Established as DEW Line Main site, 1957. Also is part of Alaska Radar System, site A-17, Maintained by USAF 611th Air Support Group. DEW operations ended 1998; minimally-attended NWS Long Range Radar installed 1999 Station buildings remain in use and in good repair.
POW-1	Point Lonely	AK	FPS-124	70°54′37″N 153°14′23″W	1957	2007	Established as DEW Line Auxiliary site, 1957. Also was part of Alaska Radar System, site A-18. DEW operations ended 1990; unattended NWS Short Range Radar installed 1994 to cover any Long Range Radar surveillance gaps. Site deactivated 2007 due to soil erosion & budget concerns. Station buildings remain in good repair.
POW-2	Oliktok	AK	FPS-117	70°29′54″N 149°53′22″W	1957	Active	Established as DEW Line Auxiliary site, 1957. Also is part of Alaska Radar System, site A-19, Maintained by USAF 611th Air Support Group. DEW operations ended 1989; minimally-attended NWS Long Range Radar installed 1990. Station buildings remain in use and in good repair.
POW-3	Flaxman Island	AK	FPS-124	70°10′34″N 146°51′19″W	1957	2007	Established as DEW Line Auxiliary site, 1957. Also was part of Alaska Radar System as Bullen Point Short Range Radar Site site A-20. DEW operations ended 1995; unattended NWS Short Range Radar installed 1994 to cover any Long Range Radar surveillance gaps. Site deactivated 2007 due to soil erosion & budget concerns. Station buildings remain in good repair.
BAR-M	Barter Island	AK	FPS-117	70°07′49″N 143°38′21″W	1957	Active	Established as DEW Line Main site, 1957. Also is part of Alaska Radar System, site A-21, Maintained by USAF 611th Air Support Group. DEW operations ended 1989; minimally-attended NWS Long Range Radar installed 1990. Station buildings remain in use and in good repair. See also: Barter Island LRRS Airport (ICAO: PABA)
BAR-1	Komakuk Beach	YT	FPS-124	69°35′41″N 140°10′41″W	1957	Active	Established as DEW Line Auxiliary site, 1957, operations ended 1989; unattended NWS Short Range Radar installed 1990 to cover any Long Range Radar surveillance gaps. Now located in Yukon's Ivvavik National Park, station site remediation work was completed by 2005. Komakuk Beach SRRS Airport (ICAO: CYAJ) is listed in the Canada Flight Supplement as abandoned.
BAR-B	Stokes Point	YT	FPS-124	69°19′49″N 138°44′13″W	1957	Active	Established as DEW Intermediate site, closed and site abandoned in 1963. Reopened as unattended NWS Short Range Radar site in 1991 to cover any Long Range Radar surveillance gaps. Now located in Yukon's Ivvavik National Park, no station site remediation is planned. Stokes Point SRRS Airport is listed in the Canada Flight Supplement as abandoned.
BAR-2	Shingle Point	YT	FPS-117	68°55′22″N 137°15′38″W	1957	Active	Established as DEW Line Auxiliary site, 1957, operations ended 1989; minimally-attended NWS Long Range Radar installed 1989. Now located in Yukon's Ivvavik National Park; station site remediation status is undetermined. Shingle Point LRRS Airport (ICAO: CYUA) is listed in the Canada Flight Supplement as abandoned.
BAR-BA3	Storm Hills	NT	FPS-124	68°53′39″N 133°56′31″W	1990	Active	Established in November 1990 as an unattended NWS Short Range Radar site to cover any Long Range Radar surveillance gaps. The site consists of a radar tower, communications facility, and small storage building. Helicopter pad used for access to site.
BAR-3	Tuktoyaktuk	NT	FPS-124	69°26′35″N 132°59′55″W	1957	Active	Established as DEW Line Auxiliary site, 1957, operations ended 13 September 1993; unattended NWS Short Range Radar installed in September 1990 to cover any Long Range Radar surveillance gaps. Station site remediation work was completed by 2005. The site consists of a radar tower, communications facility, and small storage building, along with gravel remains of previous DEW site roads and building footings. Tuktoyaktuk/James Gruben Airport (ICAO: CYUB) is used for access to site.
BAR-DA1	Liverpool Bay	NT	FPS-124	69°36′15″N 130°53′37″W	1990	Active	Established in November 1990 as an unattended NWS Short Range Radar site to cover any Long Range Radar surveillance gaps. The site consists of a radar tower, communications facility, and small storage building. Helicopter pad used for access to site.
BAR-4	Nicholson Peninsula	NT	FPS-124	69°55′27″N 128°58′24″W	1957	Active	Established as DEW Line Auxiliary site, 1957 on long peninsula in Beaufort Sea. Was expansive facility with airstrip and dock facility for resupplying. DEW operations ended in 1993; unattended NWS Short Range Radar installed in 1990 to cover any Long Range Radar surveillance gaps. Station site remediation work was completed by 2005. New site consists of a radar tower, communications facility, and small storage building. Helicopter pad used for access to site, DEW station airstrip is abandoned as it has partially deteriorated by erosion into the ocean.
BAR-E	Horton River	NT	FPS-124	70°00′59″N 126°56′35″W	1957	Active	Established as DEW Intermediate site "Malloch Hills", closed and site abandoned in 1963. Was expansive facility with airstrip and dock facility for resupplying. Reopened as unattended NWS Short Range Radar site in June 1991 to cover any Long Range Radar surveillance gaps. Abandoned DEW facility torn down, station site remediation work was completed by 2005, leaving gravel roads, old building pads and abandoned and unusable airstrip. NWS site consists of a radar tower, communications facility, and small storage building. Helicopter pad used for access to site.
PIN-M	Cape Parry	NT	FPS-117	70°10′17″N 124°43′30″W	1957	Active	Established as DEW Main site in 1957. Was expansive facility with airstrip and dock facility for resupplying. DEW operations ended 1989; minimally-attended NWS Long Range Radar installed 1989. Cape Parry LRRS Airport (ICAO: CZUE) is listed in the Canada Flight Supplement as abandoned.
PIN-1BD	Keats Point	NT	FPS-124	69°40′22″N 121°40′19″W	1991	Active	Established in July 1991 as an unattended NWS Short Range Radar site to cover any Long Range Radar surveillance gaps. The site consists of a radar tower, communications facility, and small storage building. Helicopter pad used for access to site.
PIN-1BG	Croker River	NU	FPS-124	69°16′00″N 119°13′00″W	1991	Active	Established in August 1991 as an unattended NWS Short Range Radar site to cover any Long Range Radar surveillance gaps.
PIN-2A	Harding River	NU	FPS-124	68°50′10″N 116°58′05″W	1991	Active	Established in September 1991 as an unattended NWS Short Range Radar site to cover any Long Range Radar surveillance gaps.
PIN-CB	Bernard Harbour	NU	FPS-124	68°45′19″N 114°56′21″W	1991	Active	Established as DEW Intermediate site in 1957, designated "PIN-C" (68°46′55″N 114°50′06″W). Was expansive facility with airstrip and dock facility for resupplying. Closed and site abandoned in 1963. Reopened as unattended NWS Short Range Radar site 3.1 mi (5.0 km) southwest of former DEW site in September 1991 to cover any Long Range Radar surveillance gaps. Abandoned DEW facility torn down, station site remediation work was completed by 2005, leaving gravel roads and old building pads. Former airstrip no longer listed in the Canada Flight Supplement, several buildings seen at airport site and gravel road connects the airport to the new NWS site. NWS site consists of a radar tower, communications facility, and small storage building. Helicopter pad used for access to site.
PIN-3	Lady Franklin Point	NU	FPS-117	68°28′45″N 113°13′32″W	1957	Active	Established as DEW Line Auxiliary site, 1957. Was expansive facility with airstrip and dock facility for resupplying. DEW operations ended in 1989; minimally-attended NWS Long Range Radar installed 1989. On 10 January 2000, a fire broke out at the site and burned for several days, destroying most of the site. Only the warehouse, hangar, garage and satellite terminals remain. As of November 2020, the site was indefinitely out of commission and without power. Lady Franklin Point LRRS Airport (ICAO: CYUJ) is listed in the Canada Flight Supplement as abandoned.
PIN-DA	Edinburgh Island	NU	FPS-124	68°29′09″N 110°51′50″W	1991	Active	Replacement for PIN-D "Ross Point" DEW Intermediate site (68°32′31″N 111°12′07″W) opened in 1957, closed and site abandoned in 1963. New site opened in October 1991 9.4 miles ESE as an unattended NWS Short Range Radar site to cover any Long Range Radar surveillance gaps. The site consists of a radar tower, communications facility, and small storage building. Helicopter pad used for access to site.
PIN-EB	Cape Peel West	NU	FPS-124	69°02′11″N 107°49′18″W	1991	Active	Replacement for PIN-E "Cape Peel" DEW Intermediate site (69°03′25″N 107°18′18″W) opened in 1957, closed and site abandoned in 1963. New site opened in October 1991, 12.9 mi (20.8 km) west as an unattended NWS Short Range Radar site to cover any Long Range Radar surveillance gaps. Helicopter pad used for access to site.
CAM-M	Cambridge Bay	NU	FPS-117	69°06′58″N 105°07′08″W	1957	Active	Established as DEW Main site in 1957. Was expansive facility with airstrip and dock facility for resupplying. DEW operations ended 1989; minimally-attended NWS Long Range Radar installed 1989. Cambridge Bay Airport (ICAO: CYCB) remains in use for access to site and is a major transportation hub to support other CAM NWS sites.
CAM-A3A	Sturt Point	NU	FPS-124	68°57′47″N 103°45′34″W	1991	Active	Replacement for CAM-A "Sturt Point" DEW Intermediate site (68°47′45″N 103°20′42″W) opened in 1957, closed and site abandoned in 1963. New site opened in October 1991, 15.5 mi (24.9 km) northwest as an unattended NWS Short Range Radar site to cover any Long Range Radar surveillance gaps. New NWS site consists of a radar tower, communications facility, and small storage building. Helicopter pad used for access to site.
CAM-1A	Jenny Lind Island	NU	FPS-124	68°44′31″N 101°51′17″W	1991	Active	Replacement for CAM-1 DEW Auxiliary site opened in 1957, closed in 1992. Dew site was located on coast, with airstrip and dock facility for resupplying. New NWS Short Range Radar site opened in October 1991 to cover any Long Range Radar surveillance gaps, located on mountain peak approximately 6.5 mi (10.5 km) NNW of former DEW site. Helicopter pad used for access to site.
CAM-B	Hat Island	NU	FPS-124	68°19′02″N 100°04′09″W	1991	Active	Established as DEW Intermediate site in 1957. Was expansive facility with airstrip and dock facility for resupplying. closed and site abandoned in 1963. Unattended NWS Short Range Radar site opened in September 1991 to cover any Long Range Radar surveillance gaps. Closed DEW facility torn down, station site remediation work was completed by 2005, leaving gravel roads, old building pads and abandoned and unusable airstrip. NWS site consists of a radar tower, communications facility, and small storage building. Helicopter pad constructed on a former airstrip for access.
CAM-2	Gladman Point	NU	FPS-124	68°40′48″N 097°48′38″W	1957	Active	Established as DEW Auxiliary site in 1957. Was expansive facility with airstrip and dock facility for resupplying. DEW operations ended 1992; minimally-attended NWS Long Range Radar installed October 1990. Closed DEW facility torn down, station site remediation work was completed by 2005, leaving gravel roads, old building pads and abandoned and unusable airstrip. NWS site consists of a radar tower, communications facility, and small storage building. Helicopter pad used for access to site.
CAM-CB	Gjoa Haven	NU	FPS-124	68°38′39″N 095°52′10″W	1990	Active	Replacement for CAM-C "Matheson Point" DEW Intermediate site (68°52′10″N 095°09′25″W) opened in 1957, closed and site abandoned in 1963. New site opened in October 1990, 1 mi (1.6 km) SE as an unattended NWS Short Range Radar site to cover any Long Range Radar surveillance gaps. The site consists of a radar tower, communications facility, and small storage building. Located near small village of Gjoa Haven, connected by gravel road to village 1.2 mi (1.9 km) south of site. Gjoa Haven Airport (ICAO: CYHK) originally built for DEW site, now small regional airport is used for access to site.
CAM-3	Shepherd Bay	NU	FPS-117	68°47′34″N 093°26′25″W	1957	Active	Established as DEW Line Auxiliary site, 1957. Was expansive facility with airstrip and dock facility for resupplying. DEW operations ended in July 1989; minimally-attended NWS Long Range Radar installed July 1989. Appears that much of the former DEW site facilities remain in use, buildings appear in good repair. Shepherd Bay SRRS Airport (ICAO: CYUS) is listed in the Canada Flight Supplement as abandoned.
CAM-D	Simpson Lake	NU	FPS-124	68°35′41″N 091°57′24″W	1957	Active	Established as DEW Intermediate site in 1957. Was expansive facility with airstrip and dock facility for resupplying. closed and site abandoned in 1963. Unattended NWS Short Range Radar site opened in September 1991 to cover any Long Range Radar surveillance gaps. Closed DEW facility partially remains in a deteriorated state gravel roads, old building pads. NWS site consists of a radar tower, communications facility, and small storage building. Helicopter pad constructed on a former airstrip for access.
CAM-4	Pelly Bay	NU	FPS-124	68°26′13″N 089°43′34″W	1957	Active	Established as DEW Line Auxiliary site, 1957. Was expansive facility with airstrip and dock facility for resupplying. DEW operations ended in 1992; NWS Short Range Radar site to cover any Long Range Radar surveillance gaps. Closed DEW facility torn down, station site remediation work was completed by 2005, leaving gravel roads, old building pads. Former airstrip remains, however a helicopter pad at NWS site used for access.
CAM-5A	Cape McLoughlin	NU	FPS-124	68°39′50″N 085°35′29″W	1992	Active	Established in July 1992 as an unattended NWS Short Range Radar site to cover any Long Range Radar surveillance gaps.
CAM-FA	Lailor River	NU	FPS-124	69°06′38″N 083°32′23″W	1992	Active	Established in August 1992 as an unattended NWS Short Range Radar site to cover any Long Range Radar surveillance gaps. The site consists of a radar tower, communications facility, and small storage building. Helicopter pad used for access to site.
FOX-M	Hall Beach	NU	FPS-117	68°45′39″N 081°13′35″W	1957	Active	Established as DEW Main site in 1957; also known as "Site 30". Was expansive facility with airstrip and dock facility for resupplying. DEW operations ended September 1989; minimally-attended NWS Long Range Radar September 1989. Appears that much of the former DEW site facilities remain in use, buildings appear in good repair. Sanirajak Airport (ICAO: CYUX) remains in use for access to site.
FOX-1	Rowley Island	NU	FPS-124	69°04′01″N 079°03′55″W	1957	Active	Established as DEW Line Auxiliary site, 1957. Was expansive facility with airstrip and dock facility for resupplying. DEW operations ended in 1991; unattended NWS Short Range Radar site to cover any Long Range Radar surveillance gaps. Abandoned DEW facility torn down, station site remediation work was completed by 2005, leaving gravel roads, old building pads and abandoned and unusable airstrip. NWS site consists of a radar tower, communications facility, and small storage building. Helicopter pad used for access to site.
FOX-A	Bray Island	NU	FPS-124	69°13′26″N 077°13′48″W	1957	Active	Established as DEW Intermediate site in 1957; also known as "Site 32". Was expansive facility with airstrip and dock facility for resupplying. closed and site abandoned in 1963. New unattended NWS Short Range Radar site to cover any Long Range Radar surveillance gaps on former DEW site. Abandoned DEW facility torn down, station site remediation work was completed by 2005, leaving gravel roads, old building pads and abandoned and unusable airstrip. NWS site consists of a radar tower, communications facility, and small storage building. Helicopter pad used for access to site.
FOX-2	Longstaff Bluff	NU	FPS-124	68°53′56″N 075°08′20″W	1957	Active	Established as DEW Line Auxiliary site, 1957; also known as "Site 33". Was expansive facility with airstrip and dock facility for resupplying. DEW operations ended in August 1991; unattended NWS Short Range Radar site opened November 1990 approximately 4 miles ESE of former DEW Airstrip to cover any Long Range Radar surveillance gaps. NWS site consists of a radar tower, communications facility, and small storage building. Unused DEW site remains, buildings appear in good repair, along with former radars and communications antennas. Airstrip is listed in the Canada Flight Supplement as abandoned.
FOX-B	Nudluardjk Lake	NU	FPS-124	68°37′10″N 073°12′45″W	1957	Active	Established as DEW Intermediate site in 1957; also known as "West Baffin", located on Baffin Island. Site was closed and abandoned in 1963. New unattended NWS Short Range Radar site to cover any Long Range Radar surveillance gaps on former DEW site.
FOX-3	Dewar Lakes	NU	FPS-117	68°39′02″N 071°13′58″W	1957	Active	Established as DEW Line Auxiliary site, 1957. Was expansive facility with airstrip and dock facility for resupplying. Located on Baffin Island. DEW operations ended in 1989; minimally-attended NWS Long Range Radar installed July 1989. Appears that much of the former DEW site facilities remain in use, buildings appear in good repair. Dewar Lakes LRRS Airport (ICAO: CYUW) is listed in the Canada Flight Supplement as abandoned.
FOX-CA	Kangok Fjord	NU	FPS-124	68°38′51″N 069°07′47″W	1992	Active	Established in September 1992 as an unattended NWS Short Range Radar site to cover any Long Range Radar surveillance gaps. Located on Baffin Island.
FOX-4	Cape Hooper	NU	FPS-124	68°28′21″N 066°48′01″W	1957	Active	Established as DEW Line Auxiliary site, 1957; also known as "Site 37" located on Baffin Island. DEW operations ended in 1991. NWS Short Range Radar site activated in December 1990 to cover any Long Range Radar surveillance gaps.
FOX-5	Broughton Island	NU	FPS-124	67°32′05″N 063°47′10″W	1957	Active	Established as DEW Line Auxiliary site, 1957; also known as "Qikiqtarjuaq" or "Site 39". Was expansive facility with airstrip and dock facility for resupplying. Unattended NWS Short Range Radar site opened 1991 approximately 6.4 mi (10.3 km) east of former DEW Airstrip to cover any Long Range Radar surveillance gaps. NWS site consists of a radar tower, communications facility, and small storage building. Former DEW airstrip now known as Qikiqtarjuaq Airport (ICAO: CYVM) used to support NWS also used by small village.
DYE-M	Cape Dyer	NU	FPS-117	66°39′52″N 061°21′21″W	1957	Active	Established as DEW Main site in 1957; also known as "Site 41". Was expansive facility with airstrip and dock facility for resupplying. DEW operations ended August 1989; minimally-attended NWS Long Range Radar August 1989. Appears that much of the former DEW site facilities remain in use, buildings appear in good repair. Cape Dyer Airport (ICAO: CYVN) is listed in the Canada Flight Supplement as abandoned.
BAF-2	Cape Mercy	NU	FPS-124	64°57′17″N 063°33′38″W	1992	Active	Established in July 1992 as an unattended NWS Short Range Radar site to cover any Long Range Radar surveillance gaps. The site consists of a radar tower, communications facility, and small storage building.
BAF-3	Brevoort Island	NU	FPS-117	63°20′24″N 064°09′29″W	1988	Active	Established in October 1988 as a minimally-attended NWS Long Range Radar installed 1989. The site consists of a radar tower, communications facility, and small storage building. Appears to have been built on a former DEW site, which station site remediation work has left gravel roads, old building pads and a gravel airstrip. Former airstrip no longer listed in the Canada Flight Supplement, but new building appears to have been erected at end of runway.
BAF-4A	Loks Land	NU	FPS-124	62°30′22″N 064°31′06″W	1992	Active	Established in August 1992 as an unattended NWS Short Range Radar site to cover any Long Range Radar surveillance gaps. The site consists of a radar tower, communications facility, and small storage building. Helicopter pad used for access to site.
BAF-5	Resolution Island	NU	FPS-124	61°35′47″N 064°38′20″W	1943	Active	Former Pinetree Line radar station N-30, closed 1961; reopened as unattended NWS Short Range Radar site in September 1991 to cover any Long Range Radar surveillance gaps. Former Pinetree Line radar station remains, building conditions indeterminate. Many former radars and communication antennas still standing. Access to site appears to be by helicopter pad.
LAB-1	Cape Kakiviak	NL	FPS-124	59°59′15″N 064°09′55″W	1992	Active	Established in July 1992 as an unattended NWS Short Range Radar site to cover any Long Range Radar surveillance gaps.
LAB-2	Saglek	NL	FPS-117	58°29′19″N 062°35′08″W	1953	Active	Former Pinetree Line radar station RCAF Station Saglek N-29, closed 1971. Minimally-attended NWS Long Range Radar installed 1989. New NWS site consists of a radar tower, communications facility, and storage and tunnel connected buildings for personnel. Abandoned Pinetree Line facility torn down, station site remediation work was completed by 2005, leaving gravel roads and old building pads. Pinetree Line airstrip in good repair, Saglek Airport (ICAO: CYSV) is listed in the Canada Flight Supplement as abandoned.
LAB-3	Cape Kiglapait	NL	FPS-124	57°08′07″N 061°28′32″W	1992	Active	Established in August 1992 as an unattended NWS Short Range Radar site to cover any Long Range Radar surveillance gaps.
LAB-4	Big Bay	NL	FPS-124	55°44′30″N 060°25′42″W	1992	Active	Established in September 1992 as an unattended NWS Short Range Radar site to cover any Long Range Radar surveillance gaps.
LAB-5	Tukialik	NL	FPS-124	54°42′53″N 058°21′30″W	1992	Active	Established in October 1992 as an unattended NWS Short Range Radar site to cover any Long Range Radar surveillance gaps.
LAB-6	Cartwright	NL	FPS-117	53°33′04″N 056°49′48″W	1953	Active	Former Pinetree Line radar station N-27, closed 1968. New minimally-attended NWS Long Range Radar installed in November 1998 to cover any Long Range Radar surveillance gaps. New NWS site consists of a radar tower, communications facility, and storage and tunnel connected buildings for personnel. Abandoned Pinetree Line facility torn down, station site remediation work was completed by 2005, leaving gravel roads and old building pads. Helicopter pad used for access to site, although site is connected by a 10 mi (16 km) gravel road to the settlement of Muddy Bay, Newfoundland and Labrador, which is connected to the Canadian highway system.

== Distant Early Warning Line sites not included ==
The following table lists the DEW Line sites not included in the NWS. Most of these sites not included were Intermediate sites closed in 1963 when they were declared obsolete. The stations consisted of a module train, a warehouse, a vehicle garage, an Inuit house, POL (Petroleum, Oil, Lubricant) tanks and a continuous wave radar tower. Others were some Auxiliary sites that were replaced with new NWS stations. DEW Line stations in the Aleutian Islands of Alaska were inactivated due to budget reductions in 1969. The DYE Stations in Greenland and Iceland were transferred to the USAF Air Forces Iceland in 1980.

The primary DEW line radars were the Raytheon AN/FPS-19 long range L-Band search radar in Canada and Alaska at main and auxiliary sites; Bendix AN/FPS-30 at the four Greenland DYE radar stations. Motorola AN/FPS-23 short range search radar was installed at the Intermediate sites, used as fillers to cover any Long Range Radar surveillance gaps.

Site ID	Geographic Place Name	Location	Radar	Coordinates	Activated	Deactivated	Notes
COB-Main	Cold Bay AFS	AK	FPS-19	55°15′49″N 162°53′08″W	1959	1969	Part of DEW Aleutians Segment, manned by USAF Alaskan Air Command 714th Aircraft Control and Warning Squadron. Closed 30 June 1969 when Aleutians DEW segment was inactivated, site appears to be remediated.
COB-1	Nikolski	AK	FPS-19	52°57′35″N 168°52′03″W	1959	1969	Manned by USAF AAC Det 1 714th AC&W Squadron; Closed 30 June 1969 when Aleutians DEW segment was inactivated; site remediated and obliterated 1998 by 11th AF.
COB-2	Dirftwood Bay	AK	FPS-19	53°58′28″N 166°54′18″W	1959	1969	Manned by USAF AAC Det 2 714th AC&W Squadron; Closed 30 June 1969 when Aleutians DEW segment was inactivated; site remediated and obliterated 1998 by 11th AF; building foundation remains
COB-3	Cape Sarichef	AK	FPS-19	54°35′32″N 164°52′34″W^{a}	1959	1969	Manned by USAF AAC Det 3 714th AC&W Squadron; Closed 30 June 1969 when Aleutians DEW segment was inactivated; site remediated and obliterated 1998 by 11th AF
COB-4	Port Moller	AK	FPS-19	55°58′41″N 160°30′01″W^{a}	1959	1969	Manned by USAF AAC Det 4 714th AC&W Squadron; Closed 30 June 1969 when Aleutians DEW segment was inactivated' site remediated and obliterated 1998 by 11th AF
COB-5	Port Heiden	AK	FPS-19	56°58′38″N 158°39′09″W^{a}	1959	1969	Manned by USAF AAC Det 5 714th AC&W Squadron; Closed 30 June 1969 when Aleutians DEW segment was inactivated; site remediated and obliterated 1998 by 11th AF
LIZ-1	Cape Lisburne AFS	AK	Numerous	68°52′12″N 166°09′00″W	1953	1983	DEW Main Site, also Alaskan Air Command AC&W Surveillance Station. Operated by the 711th Aircraft Control and Warning Squadron. Closed in 1983, now Cape Lisburne Long Range Radar Site, part of the Eleventh Air Force Alaska Radar System, equipped with a minimally-manned AN/FPS-117 radar. Maintained by contractors under the 611th Air Support Group.
LIZ-A	Cape Sabine	AK	FPS-23	69°01′27″N 163°51′25″W	1957	1963	DEW Intermediate Site; closed and abandoned, 1963. Clean-up and remediation completed early years of the 2000s (decade) by USAF. Gravel runway and building footers remain.
LIZ-B	Icy Cape	AK	FPS-23	70°17′23″N 161°54′40″W	1957	1963	DEW Intermediate Site; closed and abandoned, 1963. Clean-up and remediation completed early years of the 2000s (decade) by USAF. Gravel runway and building footers remain.
LIZ-C	Peard Bay	AK	FPS-23	70°48′29″N 158°15′32″W	1957	1963	DEW Intermediate Site; closed and abandoned, 1963. Clean-up and remediation completed early years of the 2000s (decade) by USAF. Gravel runway and building footers remain.
POW-A	Cape Simpson	AK	FPS-23	71°03′26″N 154°43′39″W	1957	1963	DEW Intermediate Site; closed and abandoned, 1963 now in-use as civilian storage/supply facility
POW-B	Kogru	AK	FPS-23	70°34′36″N 152°15′56″W	1957	1963	DEW Intermediate Site; closed and abandoned, 1963. Clean-up and remediation completed early years of the 2000s (decade) by USAF. Gravel runway and building footers remain.
POW-C	McIntyre	AK	FPS-23	70°24′10″N 148°40′46″W	1957	1963	DEW Intermediate Site; closed and abandoned, 1963. Abandoned buildings remain. Runway may or may not be usable.
POW-D	Brownlow Point	AK	FPS-23	69°58′29″N 144°50′09″W	1957	1963	DEW Intermediate Site; closed and abandoned, 1963. Clean-up and remediation completed early years of the 2000s (decade) by USAF. Gravel runway and building footers remain.
BAR-A	Demarcation Bay	AK	FPS-23	69°53′11″N 142°18′43″W	1957	1963	DEW Intermediate Site; closed and abandoned, 1963Clean-up and remediation completed early years of the 2000s (decade) by USAF. Gravel runway and building footers remain.
BAR-C	Tununuk Camp	NT	FPS-23	69°00′21″N 134°40′05″W^{a}	1957	1963	DEW Intermediate Site; closed and abandoned, 1963; site appears to be remediated.
BAR-D	Atkinson Point	NT	FPS-23	69°55′59″N 131°25′54″W^{a}	1957	1963	DEW Intermediate Site; closed and abandoned, 1963; abandoned buildings remain on site. Replaced by NWS Site Liverpool Bay SRR (BAR-DA1)
PIN-A	Pierce Point	NT	FPS-23	69°48′55″N 122°43′02″W^{a}	1957	1963	DEW Intermediate Site; closed and abandoned, 1963; site condition is undetermined
PIN-1	Clinton Point	NT	FPS-19	69°35′00″N 120°44′46″W	1957	1963	DEW Axillary Site; closed 3 September 1993. Low resolution imagery of site, condition is undetermined. Replaced by NWS Sites Keats Point SRR (PIN-1BD) and Croker River SRR (PIN-1BG).
PIN-B	Clifton Point	NT	FPS-23	69°12′56″N 118°38′11″W	1957	1963	DEW Intermediate Site; closed and abandoned, 1963. Low resolution imagery of site, condition is undetermined.
PIN-2	Cape Young	NU	FPS-19	68°56′08″N 116°56′10″W^{a}	1957	1993	DEW Axillary Site; closed 31 August 1993. Remains of site deteriorating, Clean-up and remediation scheduled 2012. Replaced by NWS Site Harding River SRR (PIN-2A)
PIN-C	Bernard Harbour	NU	FPS-23	68°46′55″N 114°50′01″W	1957	1963	DEW Intermediate Site; closed and abandoned, 1963. Clean-up and remediation completed, gravel runway not listed in the Canada Flight Supplement, new structures constructed on site, use undetermined but appears to be civilian not military radar site. Replaced by NWS Site Bernard Harbour SRR (PIN-CB)
PIN-D	Ross Point	NU	FPS-23	68°32′10″N 111°11′55″W^{a}	1957	1963	DEW Intermediate Site; closed and abandoned, 1963. Low resolution imagery of site, condition is undetermined. Replaced by NWS Site Edinburgh Island SRR (PIN-DA)
PIN-4	Byron Bay	NU	FPS-23	68°45′35″N 109°05′16″W^{a}	1957	1993	DEW Intermediate Site; closed and abandoned, 1993.
PIN-E	Cape Peel	NU	FPS-23	69°02′41″N 107°19′33″W^{a}	1957	1963	DEW Intermediate Site; closed and abandoned, 1963. Low resolution imagery of site, condition is undetermined. Replaced by NWS Site Cape Peel West SRR (PIN-EB)
CAM-A	Sturt Point	NU	FPS-23	68°47′45″N 103°20′40″W^{a}	1957	1963	DEW Intermediate Site; closed and abandoned, 1963. Low resolution imagery of site, condition is undetermined. Replaced by NWS Site Sturt Point SRR (CAM-A3A)
CAM-1	Jenny Lind Island	NU	FPS-19	68°39′25″N 101°44′19″W^{a}	1957	1990	DEW Axillary Site; replaced by NWS site CAM-1A, closed 1992; Clean-up and remediation completed 2010. Replaced by NWS Site Jenny Lind Island SRR (CAM-1A)
CAM-C	Matheson Point	NU	FPS-23	68°52′09″N 095°09′27″W	1957	1963	DEW Intermediate Site; closed and abandoned, 1963. Clean-up and remediation completed, site has been obliterated. Replaced by NWS Site Gjoa Haven SRR (CAM-CB)
CAM-E	Keith Bay	NU	FPS-23	68°15′22″N 088°10′25″W^{a}	1957	1963	DEW Intermediate Site; closed and abandoned, 1963. Low resolution imagery of site, condition is undetermined.
CAM-5	Mackar Inlet	NU	FPS-19	68°18′03″N 085°40′29″W^{a}	1957	1990	DEW Axillary Site closed 1992; Clean-up and remediation completed 2010. Replaced by NWS Site Cape McLoughlin SRR (CAM-5A)
CAM-F	Scarpa Lake	NU	FPS-23	68°34′04″N 083°28′53″W^{a}	1957	1963	DEW Intermediate Site; closed and abandoned, 1963. Low resolution imagery of site, condition is undetermined. Replaced by NWS Site Lailor River SRR (CAM-FA)
FOX-C	Ekalugad	NU	FPS-23	68°43′53″N 068°35′15″W^{a}	1957	1963	DEW Intermediate Site; closed and abandoned, 1963.
FOX-D	Kivitoo	NU	FPS-23	67°57′58″N 064°54′28″W^{a}	1957	1963	DEW Intermediate Site; closed and abandoned, 1963. Low resolution imagery of site, condition is undetermined.
FOX-E	Durban Island	NU	FPS-23	67°05′00″N 062°12′59″W^{a}	1957	1963	DEW Intermediate Site; closed and abandoned, 1963. Satellite imagery shows high levels of recent activity at the site.
DYE-1	Qaqqatoqaq	GL	FPS-30	66°38′03″N 052°52′12″W^{a}	1961	1988	Parent station was Cape Dyer, NWT, Canada (DYE-Main). Near Sisimiut, Closed 1988. Low resolution imagery of site, condition is undetermined. Site is now used as a VHF-site for aviation purposes.
DYE-2	Ice Cap 1	GL	FPS-30	66°29′30″N 046°18′19″W^{b}	1961	1988	Parent station was Cape Dyer, NWT, Canada (DYE-Main). In 1982, Ice Cap 1 (DYE-2) was moved sideways 210 ft (64 m), for life extension. Closed 1 October 1988. The 109th Airlift Wing (NY-ANG) regularly uses the landing area at DYE-2 for pilot training for practicing Antarctic takeoffs & landings (called Ice Station Ruby); a.k.a. the Raven Ski-way Training Facility. .
DYE-3	Ice Cap 2	GL	FPS-30	65°10′57″N 043°49′10″W^{b}	1961	1988	Parent station was Cape Dyer, NWT, Canada (DYE-Main). In 1977, Ice Cap 2 (DYE-3) was moved sideways 210 ft (64 m), for life extension. Closed 1988.
DYE-4	Kulusuk Island	GL	FPS-30	65°31′39″N 037°09′34″W	1961	1988	Parent station was Cape Dyer, NWT, Canada (DYE-Main). Closed 1988. Abandoned.
DYE-5	Rockville Air Station	IS	Numerous	64°02′07″N 022°39′08″W	1951	1998	Also known as "H-1". Originally Air Forces Iceland, then Aerospace Defense Command AC&W GCI site. Designated as part of DEW Line, 1957. Manned by USAF 932d Aircraft Control and Warning (later Air Defense, Later Air Control) Squadron. Closed as part of end of Cold War draw down and replaced by a new radar site established 1 km south as part of the Iceland Air Defence System.
DYE-6	Sondrestrom Air Base	GL		67°00′38″N 50°42′33″W	1951	1992	Control Center

- ^aLocation approximate due to low-resolution aerial imagery of area.
- ^bSite location obliterated by snow cover.

== See also ==
- Canadian Forces base
- Joint Surveillance System
- NORAD Tracks Santa Program
- Operation Hurricane (Canada)
