= West St. Modeste =

- Town
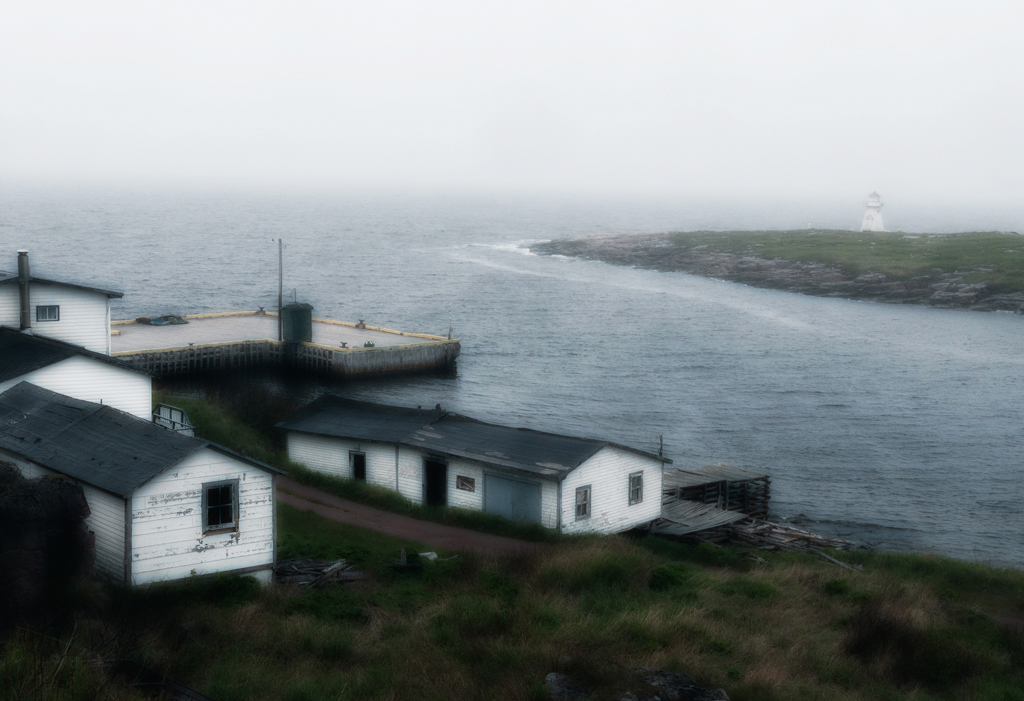
- Interactive map of West St. Modeste
- Coordinates: 51°35′51″N 56°43′19″W
- Country: Canada
- Province: Newfoundland and Labrador

Population (2021)
  - Total: 102
- Time zone: UTC-3:30 (Newfoundland Time)
  - Summer (DST): UTC-2:30 (Newfoundland Daylight)
- Area code: 709
- Highways: Route 510 (Trans-Labrador Highway)

West St. Modeste is a town in the Canadian province of Newfoundland and Labrador. The town had a population of 102 in the Canada 2021 Census.

== Demographics ==
In the 2021 Census of Population conducted by Statistics Canada, West St. Modeste had a population of 102 living in 51 of its 62 total private dwellings, a change of −8.1% from its 2016 population of 111. With a land area of 7.6 km^{2} (2.9 sq mi), it had a population density of 13.4/km^{2} (34.8/sq mi) in 2021.

Historical populations
Year	Pop.	±%
1991	202	—
1996	170	−15.8%
2001	175	+2.9%
2006	140	−20.0%
2011	120	−14.3%
2016	111	−7.5%
2021	102	−8.1%

Aboriginal population (2006)	Population	% of Total Population
First Nations	0	0
Métis	35	25
Inuit	0	0
Total Aboriginal population	35	25

== See also ==
- List of cities and towns in Newfoundland and Labrador
