= Big Bay Short Range Radar Site =

Big Bay Radar Site (LAB-4)
- Part of North Warning System
- Labrador, Canada
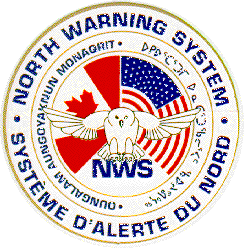

Site information
- Type: Short Range Radar Station
- Code: LAB-4
- Controlled by: North American Aerospace Defense Command

Location
- Coordinates: 55°44′19.6″N 060°25′47.9″W

Site history
- Built: September 1992
- Built by: Royal Canadian Air Force
- In use: 1992-present

Location of Big Bay (LAB-4), Labrador

Big Bay (LAB-4) is a Royal Canadian Air Force Short Range Radar Site located on the coast of Labrador, 167 miles (269 km) north of CFB Goose Bay, Newfoundland and Labrador.

== Facilities ==
The facility contains a Short Range AN/FPS-124 doppler airborne target surveillance radar that was installed in September 1992 as part of the North Warning System. The site (LAB-4) also consists of radar towers, communications facility, and storage and tunnel connected buildings for personnel.

== See also ==
- North Warning System
- Pinetree Line
