= Border Beacon =

Former Royal Canadian Air Force military installation in Labrador

Border Beacon
- Mid-Canada Line Site 212
- Part of Mid-Canada Line
- Labrador, Canada

Site information
- Controlled by: United States Air Force

Location
- Location of MCL Site 212
- Coordinates: 55.332761°N 63.214139°W

Site history
- Built: 1957
- Built by: United States Air Force
- In use: 1958 – April 1965
- Demolished: 1987

Airfield information
Runways
Direction	Length and surface
08/26	1,500 m (4,900 ft) Gravel

Border Beacon (Mid-Canada Line Site 212) was a United States Air Force military installation in Labrador, located approximately 190 km (120 mi) west of the Town of Hopedale. Border Beacon was a bistatic radar Doppler Detection Station on the Mid-Canada Line system of early-warning radar stations.

Opened in 1957, and fully operational in 1958, Border Beacon was in operation for eight years. The eastern portion of the Mid-Canada Line was shut down in 1965 and the site was closed.

== Transport Canada ==
The Government of Canada took possession of the Border Beacon site from the US in 1965 and transformed it into a weather station. Transport Canada operated the weather station until it closed in the 1970s.

== Accidents and incidents ==
- On 10 January 1986, a de Havilland Canada DHC-2 Beaver (C-GUBD) of Goose Bay Air Services departed CFB Goose Bay and crashed at Border Beacon due to unknown circumstances.
