= Tukialik Short Range Radar Site =

Tukialik Radar Site (LAB-5)
- Part of North Warning System
- Labrador, Canada
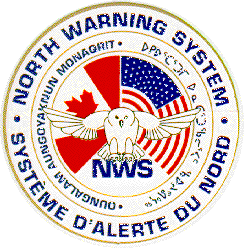

Site information
- Type: Short Range Radar Station
- Code: LAB-5
- Controlled by: North American Aerospace Defense Command

Location
- Coordinates: 54°42′53″N 058°21′30″W

Site history
- Built: October 1992
- Built by: Royal Canadian Air Force
- In use: 1992-present

Location of Tukialik (LAB-5), Labrador

Tukialik Short Range Radar Site (LAB-5) is a Royal Canadian Air Force Short Range Radar Site located in eastern Labrador, 127 miles (204 km) northeast of CFB Goose Bay, Newfoundland and Labrador, Canada.

== Facilities ==
The facility contains a Short Range AN/FPS-124 doppler airborne target surveillance radar that was installed in October 1992 as part of the North Warning System. The site (LAB-5) also consists of radar towers, communications facility, and storage and tunnel connected buildings for personnel.

== See also ==
- North Warning System
- Pinetree Line
