= Komakuk Beach =

Former DEW Line station, Yukon, Canada

Coordinates: 69°35′39.5″N 140°10′37.4″W

Komakuk Beach was the site of a DEW Line station, located on the Arctic coast of Yukon, Canada. The station was closed in 1993 pursuant to the general policy of dismantling such stations that was adopted following the collapse of the Soviet Union, which effectively ended the Cold War and obviated the need to maintain these installations.

Komakuk Beach had been the scene of considerable environmental damage, which took seven years to clean up; following this, the site was incorporated into Ivvavik National Park in 2000.

The immediate area surrounding the former station is completely uninhabited, as the northernmost settlement within Yukon is at Old Crow, approximately 225 km (140 mi) to the south.

Situated in a narrow coastal plain at the base of the Richardson Mountains and having a tundra climate, Komakuk Beach is located at 69°35' North latitude and 140°11' West longitude.

The indigenous Inuvialuit population of Komakuk Beach, together with that of Herschel Island (Qiqiktaruk), were relocated to the Northwest Territories in 1993, chiefly to the "twin cities" of Aklavik and Inuvik.

== Climate ==
Climate data for Komakuk Beach Airport
| Month | Jan | Feb | Mar | Apr | May | Jun | Jul | Aug | Sep | Oct | Nov | Dec | Year |
|---|---|---|---|---|---|---|---|---|---|---|---|---|---|
| Record high humidex | 3.8 | 3.8 | 5.6 | 5.5 | 8.9 | 32.3 | 38.9 | 32.1 | 23.8 | 8.8 | 8.8 | 4.5 | 38.9 |
| Record high °C (°F) | 8.3 (46.9) | 18.2 (64.8) | 10.1 (50.2) | 13.3 (55.9) | 17.2 (63.0) | 30.2 (86.4) | 30.0 (86.0) | 29.6 (85.3) | 24.1 (75.4) | 13.3 (55.9) | 10.0 (50.0) | 8.9 (48.0) | 30.2 (86.4) |
| Mean daily maximum °C (°F) | −19.7 (−3.5) | −20.9 (−5.6) | −21.2 (−6.2) | −13.6 (7.5) | −2.6 (27.3) | 7.5 (45.5) | 12.2 (54.0) | 10.3 (50.5) | 3.8 (38.8) | −6.4 (20.5) | −16.1 (3.0) | −19.6 (−3.3) | −7.2 (19.0) |
| Daily mean °C (°F) | −24 (−11) | −25.3 (−13.5) | −25.1 (−13.2) | −17.8 (0.0) | −5.6 (21.9) | 4.0 (39.2) | 7.8 (46.0) | 6.3 (43.3) | 0.7 (33.3) | −9.7 (14.5) | −19.9 (−3.8) | −23.7 (−10.7) | −11.0 (12.2) |
| Mean daily minimum °C (°F) | −28.7 (−19.7) | −29.8 (−21.6) | −29.2 (−20.6) | −21.9 (−7.4) | −8.5 (16.7) | 0.5 (32.9) | 3.4 (38.1) | 2.2 (36.0) | −2.4 (27.7) | −13.0 (8.6) | −23.8 (−10.8) | −27.9 (−18.2) | −14.9 (5.2) |
| Record low °C (°F) | −51.8 (−61.2) | −50.0 (−58.0) | −47.8 (−54.0) | −38.5 (−37.3) | −26.7 (−16.1) | −9.4 (15.1) | −5.6 (21.9) | −7.8 (18.0) | −17.8 (0.0) | −31.8 (−25.2) | −39.5 (−39.1) | −44.4 (−47.9) | −51.8 (−61.2) |
| Record low wind chill | −70 | −74 | −64 | −53 | −36 | −16 | −7 | −12 | −22 | −44 | −52 | −63 | −74 |
| Average precipitation mm (inches) | 5.7 (0.22) | 4.7 (0.19) | 3.6 (0.14) | 4.3 (0.17) | 5.2 (0.20) | 17.7 (0.70) | 27.3 (1.07) | 34.8 (1.37) | 22.9 (0.90) | 20.3 (0.80) | 9.0 (0.35) | 5.8 (0.23) | 161.3 (6.35) |
Source: 1971-2000 Environment Canada
