= Cartwright Long Range Radar Site =

Royal Canadian Air Force Long Range Radar Site

Cartwright Radar Site (LAB-6)
- Part of North Warning System
- Labrador, Canada
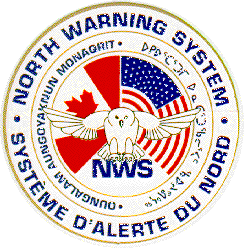

Site information
- Type: Long Range Radar Station
- Code: LAB-6
- Controlled by: North American Aerospace Defense Command

Location
- Coordinates: 53°33′04″N 056°49′48″W

Site history
- Built by: Royal Canadian Air Force
- In use: 1998-

Location of Cartwright LRR LAB-6, Labrador

Cartwright Long Range Radar Site (LAB-6) is a Royal Canadian Air Force Long Range Radar Site located 233.7 kilometres (145.2 mi) east-northeast of CFB Goose Bay, Newfoundland and Labrador.

== Facilities ==
The facility contains a long range, phased array AN/FPS-117 3-dimensional air search surveillance radar that was installed in November 1998 as part of the North Warning System. The site (LAB-6) also consists of radar towers, communications facility, and storage and tunnel connected buildings for personnel.

== History ==
The present Long Range Radar site is built 21.7 kilometres (13.5 mi) south of Cartwright Air Station, which was established in 1953 as a General Surveillance Radar station, by the United States Air Force. It was used initially by the Northeast Air Command, which stationed the 922d Aircraft Control and Warning Squadron on the station on 1 October 1953. The station functioned as a Ground-Control Intercept (GCI) and warning station as part of the Pinetree Line.

== See also ==
- North Warning System
- Pinetree Line
