= Saglek Bay =

- Location within Newfoundland and Labrador
- Coordinates: 58°33′37″N 62°51′59″W
- Max. length: 41 miles (66 km)
- Max. width: 13 miles (21 km)

Saglek Bay

Saglek Bay (or Saeglek Bay) is a long, narrow inlet or bay in Labrador. From its head to the sea it is about 36–41 miles (58–66 km) long. The mouth of the bay is roughly 13 miles wide, narrowing to 2.5 miles (4.0 km) to the east of Jens Haven Island. At this point, the bay becomes a set of branching fjords. In addition to Jens Haven Island, Saglek Bay is also home to Branagin Island, Rose Island, Upernavik Island, Shuldham Island, Handy Island, Big Island, and Kangalasiorvik Island, as well as several other small rocky islands and islets. Little vegetation is present in the bay, on islands or the mainland; however, some small stands of trees do exist, along with some solitary specimens in the fjords. Saglek Bay has been home to multiple groups since at least 2600 BCE.

== See also ==
- CFS Saglek
- Saglek Airport
