= AN/FPS-124 =

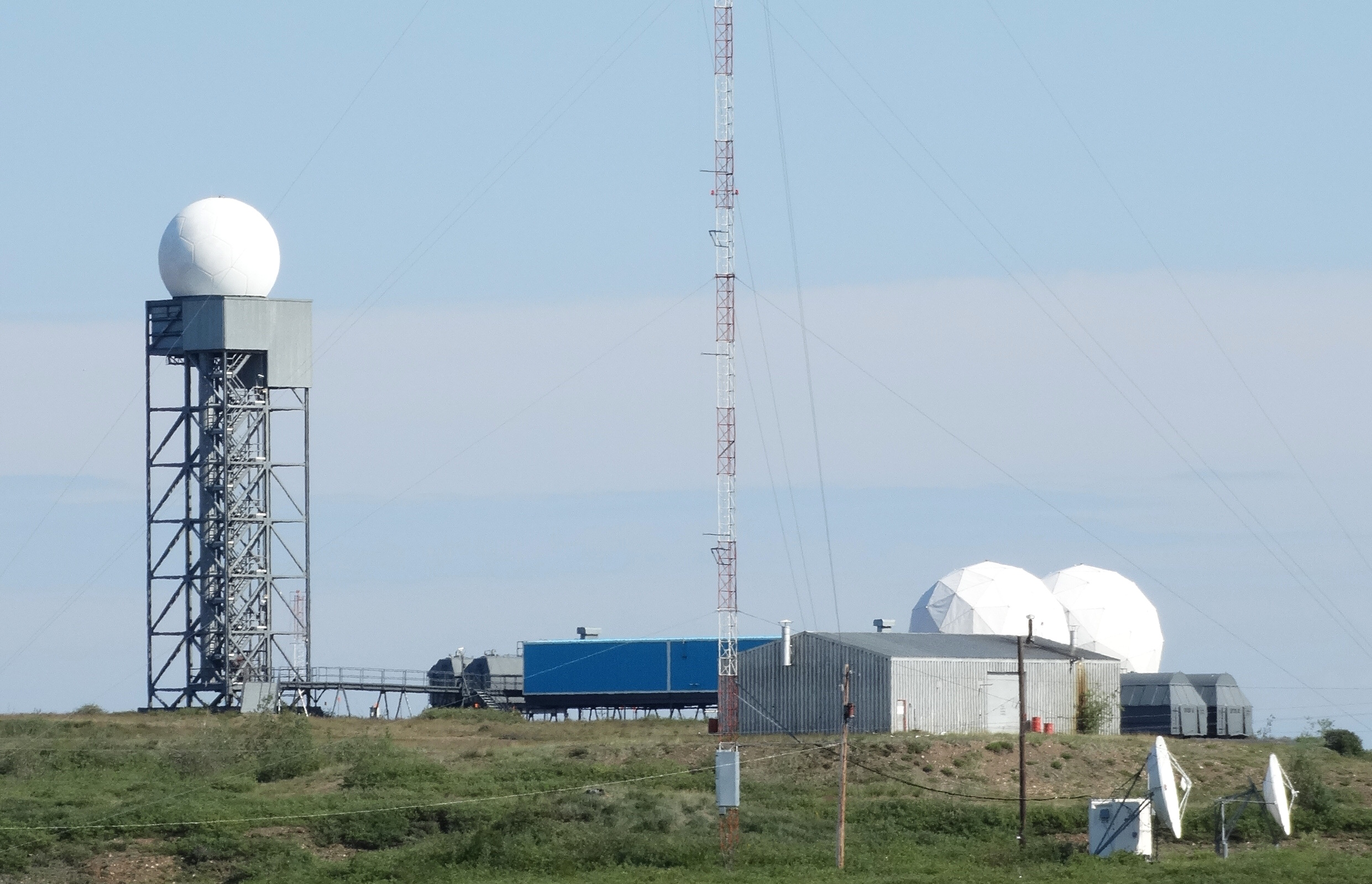
- AN/FPS-124 (left atop tower) at North Warning System site "BAR-3"
- Country of origin: United States
- Introduced: Late 1970s
- Type: Short-range radar system
- Frequency: 1215 to 1400 MHz (D/L)
- Range: 70 mi (110 km)
- Altitude: 15,000 m (49,000 ft)

The AN/FPS-124 is an unattended radar (UAR) providing short range, Doppler radar surveillance of airborne targets. It provides target information to the Regional Operations Control Center (ROCC), and employs built-in-test, performance monitoring/fault isolation and system redundancy enabling it to reconfigure itself when fault detection occurs.

The AN/FPS-117 and AN/FPS-124 form an array of radars stretching across North America from Alaska, United States to Labrador, Canada. This North Warning System is designed to provide long-range detection and coverage for drug interdiction support and tactical command and control. Implementation of the North Warning System has resulted in a reduction in Operations and Maintenance (O&M) spending by up to 50% compared to previous systems.

Due to extreme northern locations of some of these radars, the physics of radiowave propagation in the 1215–1400 MHz frequency range is even more critical for target detection requirements. The AN/FPS-124 is intended to cover any surveillance gaps left by the North Warning System's long range radar, the AN/FPS-117.

In accordance with the Joint Electronics Type Designation System (JETDS), the "AN/FPS-124" designation represents the 124th design of an Army-Navy electronic device for fixed ground search radar.

== See also ==
- List of military electronics of the United States
- List of radars
