= Colville Delta =

River delta in northern Alaska, US

Coordinates: 70.4°N 150.8°W

Colville Delta is a river delta in northern Alaska that flows into Harrison Bay. The delta is so flat that it has been said that it is indiscernible where the river ends and the ocean begins. The powerful outflow of the Colville River creates a shallow region that is rich with nutrients, making it ecologically significant for wildlife.

Map of the Harrison Bay and Colville River Delta region in the Beaufort Sea

== Geography ==
The Colville River, approximately 350 miles (560 km) long, flows from the De Long Mountains until it reaches the Alaska Native community of Nuiqsut, where it forms a broad delta.

== Fauna ==
The waters of the Colville delta, along with the waters of Harrison Bay, make an ideal refuge for long-tailed ducks, king eiders, red-throated loons, Arctic terns, surf scoters, brant geese, and glaucous gulls. In summer and fall, migrating red-throated and yellow-billed loons and king and spectacled eiders stop in to rest and feed. Nearshore forage fish are important in Arctic food webs, linking energy from smaller prey items to larger predators like birds and marine mammals. Harrison Bay is important habitat for forage fish, such as Arctic cod and capelin.

In addition to the many birds, wintering polar bears hunt and feed on ice seals in the shore-fast ice, along open leads, or at openings in pack ice. Pregnant polar bears frequently build winter dens in and around the area

The Colville River used to host a small commercial fishery for Arctic ciscoes, and though the fishery is closed, the river delta is still potential habitat for Salmonidae fishes like broad whitefish and nearshore forage fishes like Arctic cod and capelin.
