= CD5 =

CD5 or CD-5 may be:

- CD5 (protein), cluster of differentiation 5 molecule, type I transmembrane protein
- Compact disc, 5-inch CD, usually music CD
  - CD single, a music single on a 5-inch CD
- CD-5 drill site at Alpine, Alaska oil field
