= Kenai Peninsula Orchestra =

- Orchestra
- Founded: 1982
- Location: Kenai Peninsula, Alaska
- Website: www.kpoalaska.com

The Kenai Peninsula Orchestra is an orchestra based on the Kenai Peninsula of Alaska. Their headquarters is at 355 W. Pioneer Avenue in Homer, but the organization operates throughout the peninsula. The orchestra was founded in 1983, as a regional alternative to the more localized Kenai Symphony Orchestra which struggled to find enough participants in the Kenai area to fill its ranks. Originally the orchestra only performed during the summer season. In 1998 the summer events were organized into a festival, and additional concerts were scheduled around the Peninsula during the remaining months of the year. Most rehearsals are held in Ninilchik, which is approximately halfway between the Kenai/Soldotna area and Homer, the largest population centers on the Peninsula. In addition to full-on orchestral concerts, the orchestra also presents smaller concerts featuring string quartets, brass quartets and soloists. The orchestra is a non-profit organization and receives funding from individuals, as well as large group donors such as ConocoPhillips Alaska and the National Endowment for the Arts.

== Summer music festival ==
KPO is known for its Summer Music Festival, which is ongoing for several weeks in July and August. Various acts perform at a variety of locations, including lunch concerts at restaurants. Guest players from around the country join KPO members, spreading the festival out over the various settlements on the Peninsula. Guests have included members of other orchestras, soloists, or entire groups such as string quartets. The festival culminates with 2 Gala Concerts - one in Kenai and one in Homer - performing such works as Dvorak's "Symphony No. 9: From the New World" and Tchaikovsky's "1812 Festival Overture".

== Premieres ==
In 2005 Adrienne Albert was appointed the orchestra's composer-in-residence and KPO received a grant to finance creation of a new work written specifically for them. In 2007 KPO premiered the three movement symphony entitled "An Alaskan Symphony".
