= Oliktok Long Range Radar Site =

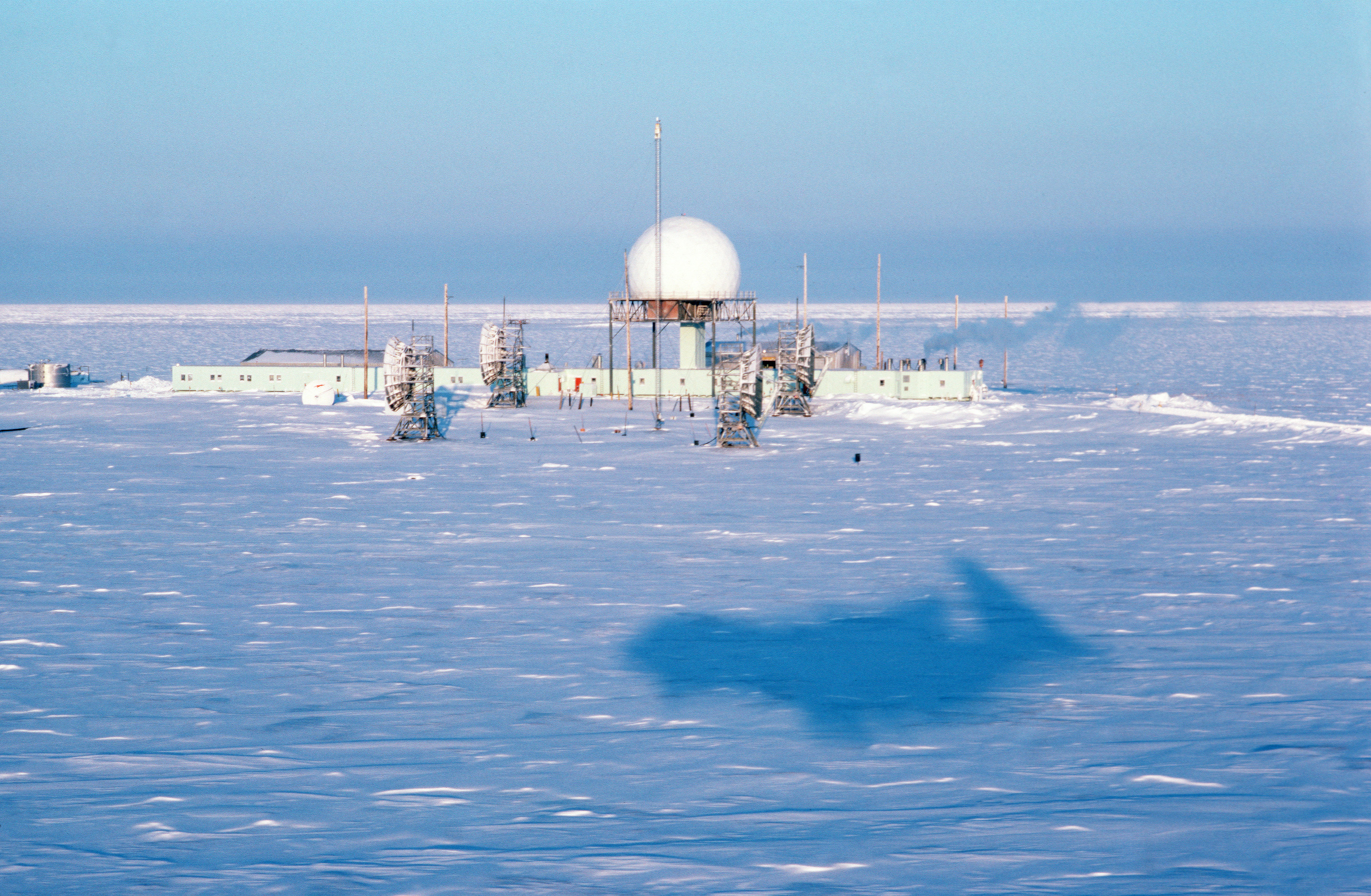
- IATA: none; ICAO: POLI

Summary
- Airport type: Military
- Coordinates: 70°29′54″N 149°53′22″W

Map
- Location of Oliktok Long Range Radar Site

Runways
Direction	Length		Surface
Direction	ft	m	Surface
04/24	4,020	1,219	Gravel

Oliktok Long Range Radar Site, DEW station POW-2 or NWS station A-19, is a United States Air Force radar site located 164 miles (264 km) east-southeast of Point Barrow, Alaska. The associated military airstrip is known as (ICAO: POLI, TC LID: XWS) and is not open for public use.

== History ==
The site built in 1957 to support the Distant Early Warning Line radar station at Point Barrow (POW-MAIN), which logistically supported it. It was named POW-2 during this period. It was operated by civilian contract workers. DEW Line operations ceased in April 1995, and the personnel were relieved from their duties.

The radar station was upgraded with new radars and in 1990 was re-designated part of the North Warning System (NWS) as a Long Range Radar Site, A-19, equipped with a minimally attended AN/FPS-117 long-range surveillance radar. In 1998 Pacific Air Forces initiated "Operation Clean Sweep", in which abandoned Cold War stations in Alaska were remediated and the land restored to its previous state.

The site remediation of the radar and support station was carried out by the 611th Civil Engineering Squadron at Elmendorf AFB, and remediation work was completed by 2005.

The site remains active and is staffed by civilian contractors for periodic maintenance, and accessed by road from Deadhorse. The airstrip is closed.

== 21 st century ==
As of 2019, there was discussion at the Geophysical Institute of the University of Alaska Fairbanks to establish a permanent research station (High Arctic Research Center) at Oliktok Point.

The Oliktok Dock is being used by at least two oil projects to ship materials: The Willow project and the Pikka Unit Nanushuk Development Project, both in the Nanushuk Formation.

== See also ==
- North Warning System
- Distant Early Warning Line
- Alaskan Air Command
- Eleventh Air Force
