= ConocoPhillips Alaska =

Subsidiary of ConocoPhillips located in Anchorage, Alaska

ConocoPhillips Alaska, Inc.

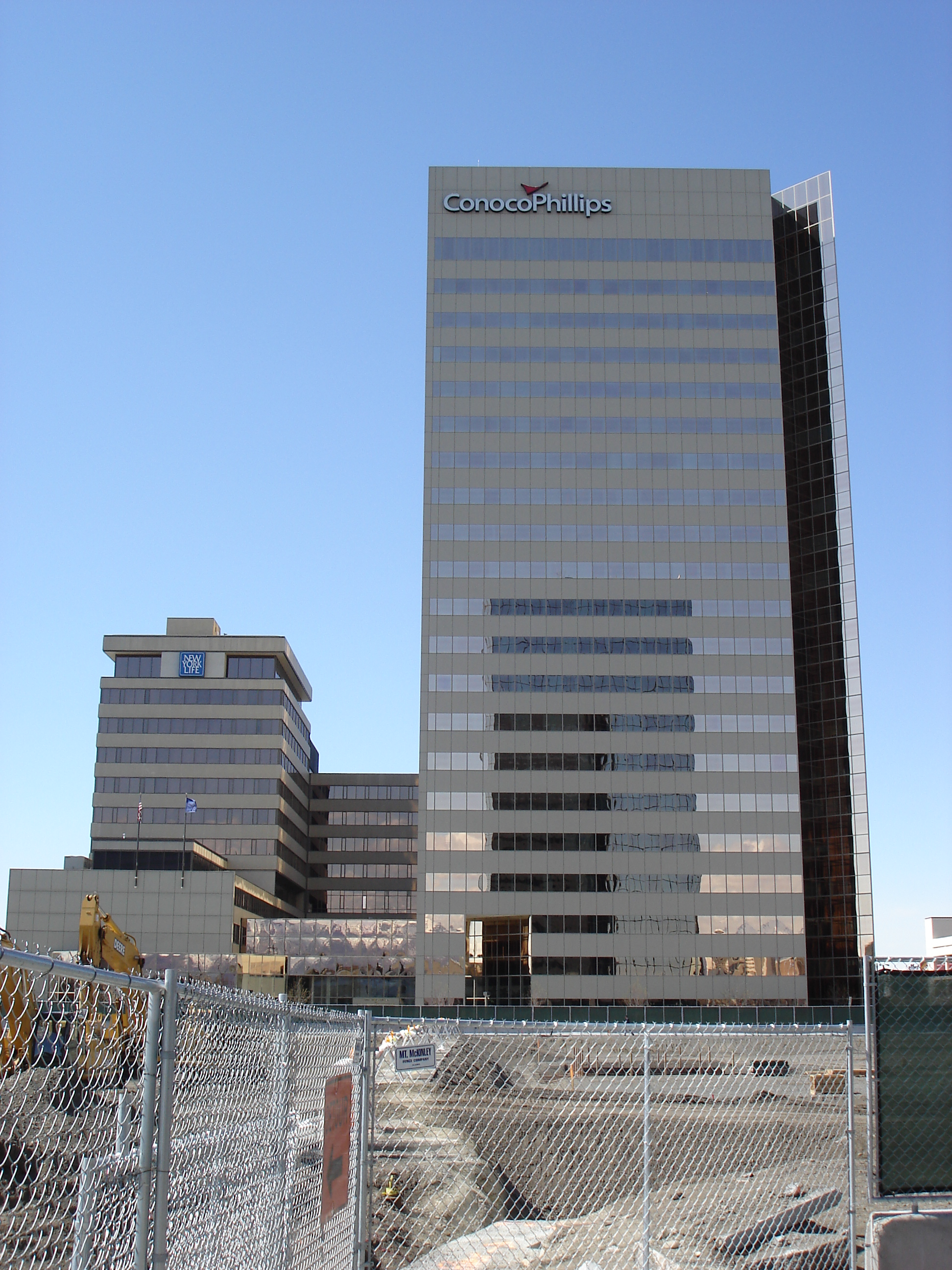
- The Conoco-Phillips Building in downtown Anchorage, constructed in 1983 as the ARCO Tower, is the company's Alaska headquarters
- Type: Subsidiary
- Industry: Oil and gas
- Headquarters: Anchorage, Alaska, United States
- Products: Oil and gas exploration and production, pipeline transportation
- Number of employees: 1,000
- Parent: ConocoPhillips
- Website: alaska.conocophillips.com

ConocoPhillips Alaska, Inc. is a subsidiary of ConocoPhillips, with its headquarters in Anchorage, Alaska. The company has major lease holdings on the North Slope and is Alaska's largest producer of oil and gas, employing about 1,000 persons.

== Controversy surrounding it ==
In 2021, ConocoPhillips faced controversy when a gas leak occurred at one of its Alaskan drilling sites. This incident sparked concerns about the safety record of its operations in Texas, where a series of accidents resulted in more than two dozen worker deaths and scores of injuries. In August 2021, a federal judge reversed the U.S. government's approval of ConocoPhillips' planned $6 billion Willow oil development in Alaska due to problems with its environmental analysis. This ruling was a blow to the massive drilling project that Alaskan officials had hoped would help offset oil production declines in the state. In January 2023, ConocoPhillips sued the state of Alaska over a road-use dispute with another oil company that plans to develop a giant North Slope prospect. The disagreement between Oil Search and ConocoPhillips over the terms for the use of roads dates back well over a year. ConocoPhillips has also tried to evade controversy by pulling out of controversial exploration activities in the Peruvian Amazon and environmentally sensitive Chukchi Sea off Alaska, as well as suing another state agency to prevent it from releasing well data related to its Willow project.

== Operations ==
ConocoPhillips Alaska operates the Kuparuk oil field, the Alpine oil field and has interests in the Prudhoe Bay Oil Field. In January 2010 the company announced that it was delaying its latest North Slope project due to a failure to secure a permit from the U.S. Army Corps of Engineers to construct a bridge needed for the project.

In the Cook Inlet Area, the company operates the Kenai liquefied natural gas export terminal, the Tyonek oil platform in the North Cook Inlet field and the Beluga River natural gas field.

ConocoPhillips Alaska has also teamed with BP on a project to construct the long discussed Alaska gas pipeline to retrieve stranded gas from the North Slope, but a competing project by TransCanada Corporation has some support from both the state and federal government.

== Relationship with Alaska and the federal government ==
Oil companies often have a rocky relationship with the state government of Alaska, as they are a highly valued class of corporate taxpayers who sometimes portray themselves as carrying too much of the state's tax burden. Alaska is one of the few states that does not have a statewide sales tax or income tax, instead relying heavily on revenue from leasing land for energy development and taxing profits on extracted resources such as oil and gas. Conoco Phillips Alaska asked the Alaska legislature in 2010 to reconsider some provisions of the law known as the Alaska's Clear and Equitable Share, which sets a baseline tax of 25% on all revenue from Alaskan oil, which can increase to up to 75% as the price of a barrel of oil increases.

== Corporate giving ==
Oil companies in Alaska are important taxpayers and donors to public and private causes, and CPA is no exception. In 2008 the company donated fifteen million dollars to the University of Alaska for construction of new science education facility, the largest donation the University has ever received. The company has also supported athletic competitions in winter sports in Alaska, including sponsoring cross-country skiing competitions in Alaska and supporting the U.S. Olympic cross-country team. In December 2024, ConocoPhillips Alaska employees donated 454,500 meals through their annual food drive to the Food Bank of Alaska, supporting hunger relief across the state.

== Jim Bowles ==
On Saturday February 13, 2010, the president of ConocoPhillips Alaska, Jim Bowles, died in an avalanche. South-central Alaska had been experiencing an unusually warm, wet winter and numerous avalanches occurred during this time period.
