= Harrison Bay =

Harrison Bay may refer to:

in Canada

- Harrison Bay (British Columbia), on the Harrison River at the Fraser River

in the United States

- Harrison Bay (Beaufort Sea), a bay on the north coast of Alaska, location of an island named for George Baker Leavitt, Sr.
- Harrison Bay, in Harrison Bay State Park, on Chickamauga Lake, Tennessee, named for submerged, former Harrison, Tennessee
