= George M. Low Award =

NASA award

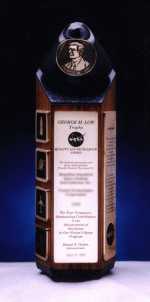
- George M. Low Award

The George M. Low Award is an annual award given by NASA to its subcontractors in recognition of quality and performance. NASA characterizes it as a "premier award". NASA's chief of safety and mission assurance, Terrence Wilcutt, called it "our recognition for their management's leadership and employee commitment to the highest standards in performance."

The award was named after George M. Low, a NASA leader and former administrator who spearheaded efforts to improve quality and mitigate risk after the disastrous Apollo 1 fire. He provided management and direction for the Mercury, Gemini, Apollo, and advanced crewed missions programs.

== Recipients ==
- 2012 - URS Federal Services; ATA Engineering, Inc.
- 2011 - Sierra Lobo, Inc.; Teledyne Brown Engineering
- 2010 - Analytical Mechanics Associates, Inc.; Neptec Design Group; Jacobs Technology, Inc.; ATK Aerospace Systems
- 2009 - United Space Alliance; Applied Geo Technologies
- 2008 - ARES Corporation; Oceaneering International
- 2007 - ASRC Aerospace Corporation; Pratt & Whitney Rocketdyne; Sierra Lobo; Lockheed Martin
- 2006 - Teledyne Brown Engineering; Barrios Technologies
- 2005 - SGT Inc; ATK Thiokol; QSS Group, Inc.; BTAS, Inc
- 2004 - BTAS, Inc. (Business Technologies and Solutions), ERC, Inc; Northrop Grumman; SGS; Alliance Spacesystems, Inc.; Titan Corporation
- 2003 - Marotta Controls; Lockheed Martin; Boeing
- 2002 - Analytical Services & Materials; Jacobs Sverdrup; ManTech; RS Information Systems; Williams International
- 2001 - Native American Services; Raytheon; Swales Aerospace
- 2000 - Advanced Technology; Boeing; Computer Sciences Corporation; Jackson and Tull
- 1999 - Barrios Technology; Kay and Associates; Raytheon; Thiokol Corporation
- 1997-1998 - Advanced Technology, AlliedSignal, BST Systems, DynCorp, ILC Dover
- 1996-1997 - Dynamic Engineering, Inc.; Hummer Associates; Boeing North American; Scientific and Commercial Systems Corporation; Hamilton Standard Space Systems International; Unisys Corporation
- 1995-1996 - Hamilton Standard Space Systems International
- 1994-1995 - Unisys Corporation
- 1992 - IBM; Honeywell
- 1991 - Thiokol Corporation; Grumman Corporation
- 1990 - Rockwell International Corporation; Marotta Scientific Controls
- 1989 - Lockheed Corporation
- 1988 - Rockwell International Corporation
- 1987 - IBM; Martin Marietta Corporation

== See also ==
- List of engineering awards
- List of awards named after people
