= Alpine, Alaska =

Unincorporated community in the state of Alaska, United States

- Former Census-designated place (CDP)
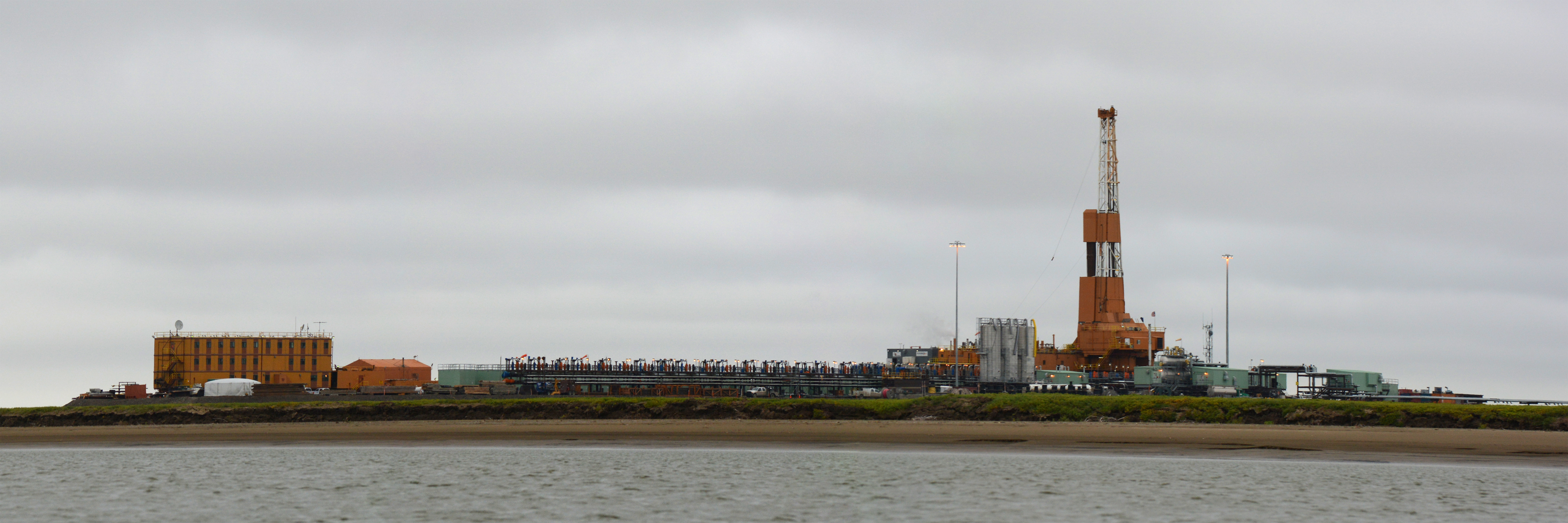
- Part of the Alpine Oil Field

- Location within the state of Alaska
- Coordinates: 70°19′41″N 150°58′39″W
- Country: United States
- State: Alaska
- Borough: North Slope

Government
  - Borough mayor: Harry K. Brower, Jr.
  - State senator: Donny Olson (D)
  - State rep.: Robyn Burke (D)

Area
  - Total: 39.2 sq mi (101.5 km^{2})
  - Land: 38.3 sq mi (99.1 km^{2})
  - Water: 0.93 sq mi (2.4 km^{2})
- Elevation: 13 ft (4 m)

Population (2000)
  - Total: 250 (workers)
- Time zone: UTC-9 (Alaska (AKST))
  - Summer (DST): UTC-8 (AKDT)
- Area code: 907
- FIPS code: 02-01882
- GNIS feature ID: 1865544

Alpine is an unincorporated community and former census-designated place in the North Slope Borough of Alaska within the National Petroleum Reserve-Alaska on native lands. The population was 0 at the 2000 United States census, but it was not included in the 2010 census.

Alpine is the site of a major oil drilling operation by ConocoPhillips, producing since 2000 with a peak in November 2005, further expansion in 2015 to build CD-5 and oil wells in Greater Mooses Tooth Unit 1 and 2. The infrastructure of Greater Mooses Tooth unit with pipelines, roads and mudplants to be used by the much larger Willow project located further West in the Bear Tooth Unit. Alpine is staffed primarily by commuter residents of Nuiqsut working a two-week on and two week off work schedule.

== Geography ==
Alpine is located at 70°14′18″N 150°59′40″W. According to the United States Census Bureau, the CDP has a total area of 39.2 mi^{2} (102 km^{2}), of which 38.3 mi^{2} (99 km^{2}) is land and 0.9 mi^{2} (2.3 km^{2}), or 2.40%, is water. It is located 8 miles north of Nuiqsut, Alaska.

== Transportation ==
The area is served by the Alpine Airstrip. The closest commercial airport is at Deadhorse.

== Demographics ==
Historical population
Census	Pop.	Note	%±
2000	0		—
U.S. Decennial Census

Alpine first appeared as a census-designated place (CDP) in 2000, but did not report any residents. As of the census of 2000 there were no permanent people living in the CDP, but approximately 250 workers in the work camp. Its status as a CDP was abolished as of the 2010 census.

== Oil production ==
Discovered in 1994 and declared commercial in 1996, the Alpine Oil Pool was the largest oil field discovered in the US in over a decade. Development drilling began in 1998, and nine facilities modules were delivered to the North Slope via sealift during July 1999. Regular production began in November 2000. The Alpine Oil Pool produced an average of 97,485 BOPD during 2003 and 98,895 BOPD in 2004. Major upgrades were undertaken in 2004 to the water handling capacity and in 2005 to the oil handling, seawater injection and gas handling capacity. These upgrades enabled the production to peak at 130,687 barrels (20,777.6 m^{3}) in November 2005. Since that peak, production from the pool has declined, despite continued development drilling operations and stood at an average of 44,126 barrels (7,015.5 m^{3}) during first six months of 2019.

In June 2023, Alaska regulators proposed that Conoco Philips receive a 914,000$ penalty for its handling of a “shallow underground blowout” of a well in 2022, as gas was released uncontrollably at the surface for days across various locations.

=== CD-5 ===
In the fourth quarter of 2015, oil production from a new "CD-5" drill on-pad site began, located to access both the Nanuq Kuparuk and the Alpine participating areas. It is part of the Colville River Unit, operated by ConocoPhillips Alaska, Inc. (78%) and a subsidiary of Anadarko Petroleum Corporation (22%). The CD-5 site became the first commercial oil development on Alaska Native lands within the boundaries of the National Petroleum Reserve-Alaska on land owned by "Kuukpik Corporation", the village corporation for Nuiqsut, with subsurface rights owned by Arctic Slope Regional Corporation. The CD-5 project has 33 wells, includes a 6 mile road, four bridges, 32 miles of pipelines and electrical infrastructure and cost more than $1 billion. Oil from CD-5 is processed in Alpine, then flows through Kuparuk to the Trans-Alaska Pipeline System. Alpine field production gradually increased, averaging 54,720 barrels per day in February, up from 53,007 barrels per day in January and 50,389 barrels per day year over year, from February 2021. In 2016, ConocoPhillips planned more wells.

=== Greater Mooses Tooth Unit 1 and 2 ===
In 2015, the Bureau of Land Management (BLM) permitted this satellite project in Greater Mooses Tooth area, west of the Colville River delta, also on lands owned by Kuukpik Corporation. In 2017, two bridges were constructed, one to carry a drilling ridge, the other to carry drill rig module. First oil was expected in late 2018.

The Greater Mooses Tooth unit 2 was planned for 48 wells, cost to exceed $1 billion with first oil expected between late-2020 and 2021.

The infrastructure of Greater Mooses Tooth unit is to be used by the much larger Willow project located further West in the Bear Tooth Unit.

== Climate ==
Climate data for Alpine, Alaska, 1991–2020 normals
Month	Jan	Feb	Mar	Apr	May	Jun	Jul	Aug	Sep	Oct	Nov	Dec	Year
Mean daily maximum °F (°C)	−9.9 (−23.3)	−9.1 (−22.8)	−4.3 (−20.2)	11.6 (−11.3)	30.5 (−0.8)	47.6 (8.7)	56.0 (13.3)	50.8 (10.4)	39.8 (4.3)	25.9 (−3.4)	9.0 (−12.8)	−3.0 (−19.4)	20.4 (−6.4)
Daily mean °F (°C)	−15.9 (−26.6)	−15.1 (−26.2)	−11.9 (−24.4)	4.6 (−15.2)	25.5 (−3.6)	40.9 (4.9)	49.4 (9.7)	44.7 (7.1)	35.8 (2.1)	21.6 (−5.8)	2.1 (−16.6)	−8.6 (−22.6)	14.4 (−9.8)
Mean daily minimum °F (°C)	−22.0 (−30.0)	−21.2 (−29.6)	−19.5 (−28.6)	−2.3 (−19.1)	20.5 (−6.4)	34.2 (1.2)	42.8 (6.0)	38.5 (3.6)	31.7 (−0.2)	17.3 (−8.2)	−4.9 (−20.5)	−14.3 (−25.7)	8.4 (−13.1)
Average precipitation inches (mm)	0.34 (8.6)	0.51 (13)	0.38 (9.7)	0.40 (10)	0.21 (5.3)	0.78 (20)	1.40 (36)	1.37 (35)	0.79 (20)	0.84 (21)	0.53 (13)	0.57 (14)	8.12 (205.6)
Source: NOAA
