= Nanushuk Formation =

Geologic formation in the US state of Alaska

- Stratigraphic range: Cretaceous
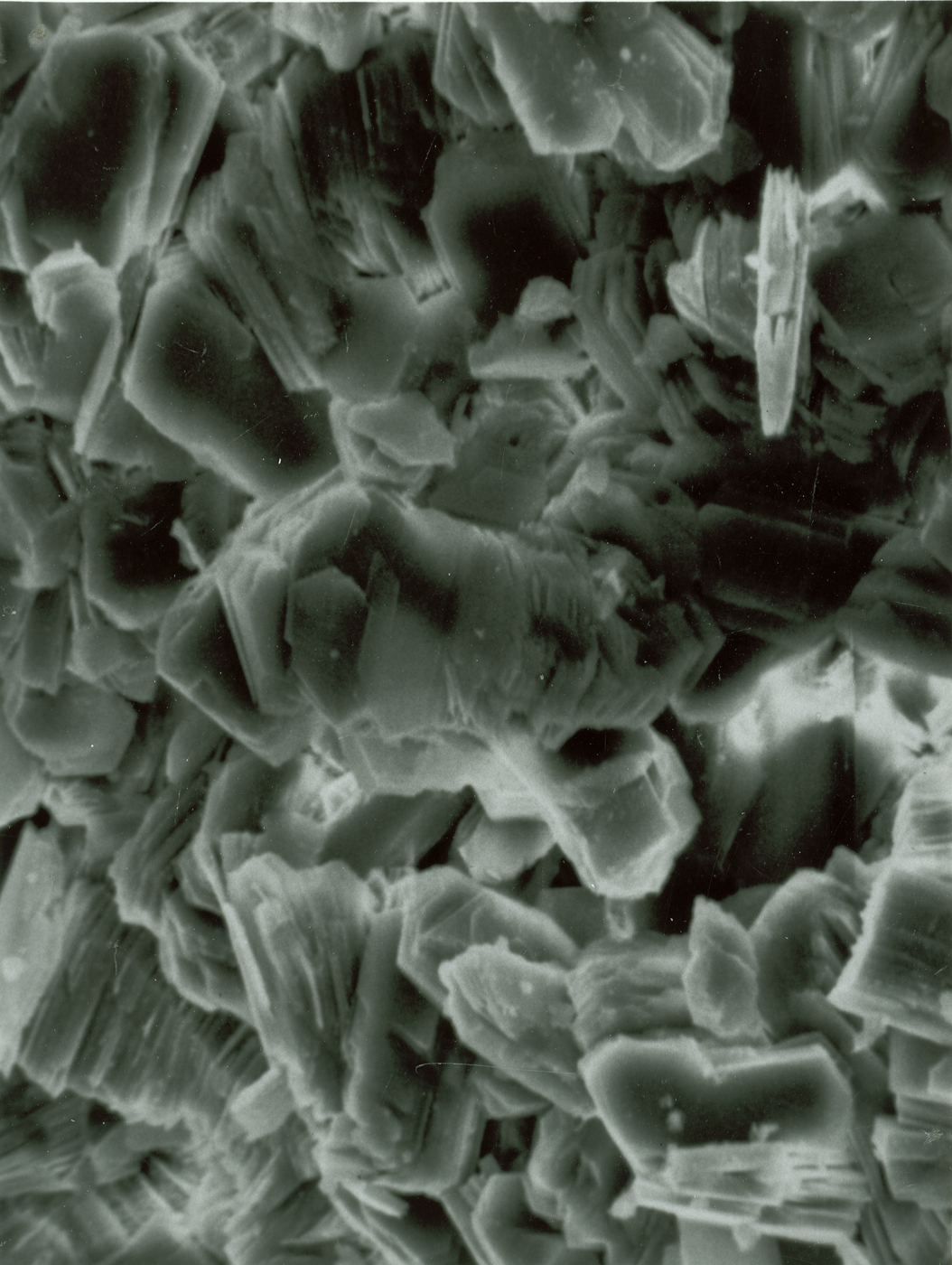
- Kaolinite in sandstone from the Nanushuk Group
- Type: Group

Location
- Region: Alaska
- Country: United States

The Nanushuk Formation or Nanushuk Group is a geologic group in Alaska in westernmost National Petroleum Reserve in Alaska (NPR-A). Petroleum in these rocks likely was generated beneath Western Alaska North Slope and migrated northeastward into NPR-A. The formation preserves fossils dating back to the Albian-Cenomanian ages of the Cretaceous period. Its thickness varies from about 1500 to about 250 meters. Underneath the Nanushuk lies the Torok Formation.

Until 2015, for more than 50 years about 150 oil exploration wells had had almost zero success; However, in 2015, Repsol announced the Pikka oil pool and in 2016, ConocoPhilips announced the Willow project.

As of 2017, the U.S. Geological Survey estimated that there were 8.7 billion barrels of oil and 25 trillion cubic feet of natural gas in the Nanushuk and Torok Formations, much more than previously estimated.

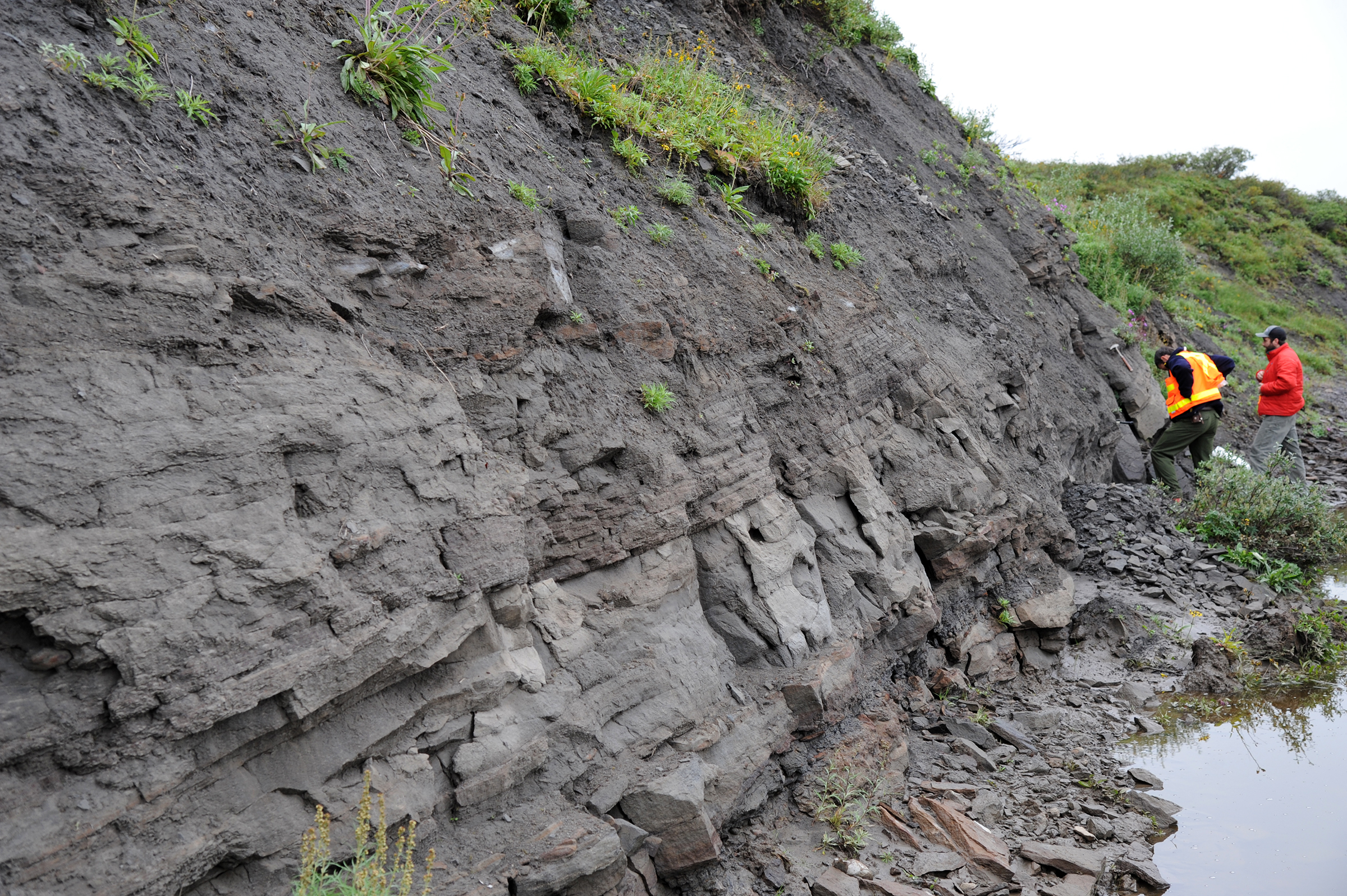
Kokolik River Oil Sand, 2013

== Geology ==
The Nanushuk Formation together with the Torok Formation below it forms a huge wedge of sediment deposited in a deep water basin and stretches from north of the Brooks Range beneath the Alaska North Slope to the adjacent offshore. It was deposited in shallow water and includes potential reservoirs in deltaic, shoreface, and fluvial sandstones. The USGS found large-scale folds and faults in the South of the formation and evidence, that the rocks have been heated to temperatures at which oil is converted to natural gas.

The thickness of the Nanushuk Formation varies from about 1500 to about 250 meters.

== Paleontology ==
The formation preserves fossils dating back to the Albian-Cenomanian ages of the Cretaceous period. Many fossilized dinosaur footprints and wood fragments have been found in this formation. Some tree trunks reached up to 58 cm in diameter. Ichnotaxa of Nanushuk Formation include avian and non-avian theropods, quadrupedal ornithischians and bipedal ornithischians. The latter make up a noticeable majority, 59% of the finds near the Kukpowruk River.

== History of oil discoveries ==
Before 2015, over a period of more than 50 years about 150 oil exploration wells had been drilled into the Nanushuk and Torok Formations, yet oil production had had almost zero success finding one small oil pool with less than 50 million barrels in place. However, as of 2017, the U.S. Geological Survey estimated that there were 8.7 billion barrels of oil and 25 trillion cubic feet of natural gas in the Nanushuk and Torok Formations, much more than previously estimated. These discoveries were possible, because of technological advancements like three-dimensional seismic data processing, extended reach drilling.

=== Pikka and Horseshoe oil pools ===
In 2013, Repsol and Armstrong Energy discovered the Pikka oil field by drilling a discovery well they called Qugruk 3.

In 2015, they announced the Pikka oil pool to the public. In 2017, an extension of the same oil pool at "Horseshoe", 21 miles south of the Pikka discovery was confirmed. Per USGS in 2017, industry estimated this Pikka-Horseshoe pool may hold more than 1.0 billion barrels (160 million cubic meters). In 2017 Armstrong sold its interests to Oil Search, an Australian-listed oil and gas company. The so-called "Nanushuk development project" is operated by Oil Search at 51% interest, and Repsol at 49% interest.

More remarkable was the pervasive presence of bioturbation with worm burrows crossing between the silts and sands. Under normal circumstances vertical flow would be much reduced in stacked silt and shale sequences but the bioturbation was sufficient to guarantee efficient vertical recovery.

In 2020, the Pikka Unit was expected to be the first development project to begin oil production in the Nanushuk formation, when Front-end engineering and design had started, though a final investment decision on the project was still pending. In May 2024 Repsol and Santos Limited subsidiary Oil Search were looking to sell 20-25% of their non-operating interest in the Pikka unit. one month after they had asked for a permit to hydraulic fracking.

In 2022, the Alaska Department of Natural Resources Division of Oil and Gas approved that Oil Search forms and operates the Horseshoe unit.

=== Willow oil pool ===
In 2017, ConocoPhillips announced discovery of the Willow oil pool in the Nanushuk Formation with estimated resources of more than 300 million barrels (48 million cubic meters).

== Taxonomy ==
The Nanushuk was reduced in rank from geologic group to geological formation and many of its subunit terms were completely abandoned.

The Corwin Formation, Chandler Formation along with its members the Killik Tongue, and Niakogon Tongue, were all reassigned to the upper or nonmarine section of the Nanushuk. The Grandstand Formation and Topagoruk Formation were reassigned to the middle or transitional portion between the lower marine and upper nonmarine. The Kukpowruk Formation, Ninuluk Formation, and Tuktu Formation were reassigned to the lower marine section. The Hatbox Tongue's name was changed to the Killik Tongue, both terms are no longer in use.
