= Harrison Bay (Beaufort Sea) =

Coordinates: 70.60°N 151.45°W

Harrison Bay is an estuary located north of Alaska that opens into the Beaufort Sea. It is adjacent to the Colville Delta. The powerful outflow of the Colville River creates a shallow region that is rich with nutrients, making it ecologically significant for wildlife.

Map of the Harrison Bay and Colville River Delta region in the Beaufort Sea

== Geography ==
Harrison Bay is bordered by Cape Halkett near Teshekpuk Lake on the western side and Oliktok Point on the eastern side. From Oliktok Point, a long chain of barrier islands head east and cross through Prudhoe Bay.

== Fauna ==
The waters of Harrison Bay make an ideal refuge for long-tailed ducks, king eiders, red-throated loons, Arctic terns, surf scoters, brant geese, and glaucous gulls. In summer and fall, migrating red-throated and yellow-billed loons and king and spectacled eiders stop in to rest and feed. Nearshore forage fish are important in Arctic food webs, linking energy from smaller prey items to larger predators like birds and marine mammals. Harrison Bay is important habitat for forage fish, such as Arctic cod and capelin.

In addition to the many birds, wintering polar bears hunt and feed on ice seals in the shore-fast ice, along open leads, or at openings in pack ice. Pregnant polar bears frequently build winter dens in and around the area.

== Energy ==
In 2015, ConocoPhillips began drilling for oil in the Colville Delta. According to Alaska Dispatch News, residents of the nearby village of Nuiqsut are concerned that the proposed drilling infrastructure will hurt subsistence hunting and fishing in the Colville Delta and thus Harrison Bay
