= Willow project =

Oil development project in Alaska, U.S.

- Location within Alaska
- Country: United States
- Region: Alaska North Slope
- Offshore/onshore: Onshore
- Coordinates: 70°17′N 151°55′W
- Operator: ConocoPhillips Alaska

Field history
- Discovery: 2016

The Willow project is an oil drilling project by ConocoPhillips located on the plain of the North Slope of Alaska in the National Petroleum Reserve in Alaska entirely on wetlands. The project was originally to construct and operate up to five drill pads for a total of 250 oil wells. Associated infrastructure includes access and infield roads, airstrips, pipelines, a gravel mine and a temporary island to facilitate module delivery via sealift barges on permafrost and between waters managed by the state of Alaska. It was 50% completed during winter 2024/2025.

Oil was discovered in the Willow prospect area west of Alpine, Alaska, in 2016, and in October 2020, the Bureau of Land Management (BLM) approved ConocoPhillips' Willow development project in its Record of Decision. After a court challenge in 2021, the BLM issued its final supplemental environmental impact statement (SEIS) in February 2023.

Alaskan lawmakers from both parties, as well as the Arctic Slope Regional Corporation, have supported the Willow project. In March 2023, the Biden administration approved the project. Environmentalist organization Earthjustice immediately filed a lawsuit on behalf of conservation groups to stop the project, saying that the approval of a new carbon pollution source contradicted President Joe Biden's promises to slash greenhouse gas emissions in half by 2030 and transition the United States to clean energy; Judge Sharon Gleason upheld the Biden administration's approval in November 2023.

The project could produce up to 750 million barrels of oil and 287 million tons of carbon emissions plus other greenhouse gases over 30 years, according to an older government estimate, release the same amount of greenhouse gasses annually as half a million homes. The BLM has predicted adverse effects on public health, the sociocultural system of Native American communities, arctic wildlife and the complex local arctic tundra.

== Geography and geology ==
The Willow project is located on the plain of the North Slope of Alaska, within the National Petroleum Reserve in Alaska, in a part called the Bear Tooth Unit West of Alpine, Alaska on native lands. It is located on Arctic coastal tundra less than 30 miles (48 km) from the Arctic Ocean and entirely on the arctic coastal plain, as depicted in Figure 3.9.2 of the final supplemental environmental impact statement (SEIS). This land consists of permafrost tundra, 94% of which is wetlands and 5% freshwater. The closest village is Nuiqsut, as depicted in Figure 1 of the Willow Master Development Plan Environmental Impact Statement.

The Willow pool is tapping oil reserves in the Nanushuk Formation.

== Expected oil extraction, revenue ==
In 2020, it was thought that over its anticipated 30-year life, the Willow project could produce 200,000 barrels of oil per day, producing up to 600 million barrels of oil in total. According to estimates by the Bureau of Land Management (BLM), Willow could generate between $8 and $17 billion in revenue. ConocoPhilips has described the $8 billion to $17 billion revenue as economic benefit, a sum of $3.9 billion in federal royalty, income tax and gravel sales, $2.3 billion NPR-A Impact mitigation grant funds returned to the state, $1.3 billion revenue to the state of Alaska from production, property and income taxes, and $1.2 billion North Slope Borough revenue from property tax. It was expected that construction of facilities would occur over 9 years, employ up to 1,650 seasonal workers and an average of 373 annual workers with 406 full-time permanent employees when operational.

In June 2021, officials at ConocoPhillips stated it had, "identified up to 3 billion barrels of oil equivalent of nearby prospects and leads with similar characteristics that could leverage the Willow infrastructure...[Willow] unlocks the West", in other words five times larger than Willow.

In January 2024, a ConocoPhillips advertising fact sheet updated its estimated oil production to "180,000 barrels of oil per day at its peak" and publicized a reduced number of permanent employees.

== Environmental footprint ==
As of 2024, Conoco was developing the project on what it calls a "385 acre gravel footprint". It has been or is in the process of building 3 drill sites, a central processing facility, an operations center pad, up to 575 total miles of ice roads during construction, an airstrip, up to 316 miles of pipelines (94 miles of new pipeline rack), only up to 37 miles of gravel roads, seven bridges, a gravel mine site on federal land in the National Petroleum Reserve–Alaska, a constructed water reservoir to provide 55 million gallons of fresh water for winter withdrawal and up to three boat ramps. It also uses sealift barge transport of construction materials and prefabricated modules from a dock at Oliktok Point near Oliktok Long Range Radar Site. The BLM's environmental impact statement found the project would result in 287 million tons of carbon emissions plus other greenhouse gases.

== History ==
In 1999, ConocoPhillips acquired the first Willow-area leases in the northeast portion of the National Petroleum Reserve in Alaska called the Bear Tooth Unit.

In 2016, the final year of the Obama administration, ConocoPhillips drilled two oil exploration wells, which encountered "significant pay". It named this discovery Willow. In 2018, the second year of the Trump administration, it appraised the greater Willow area and discovered three additional oil prospects.

In May 2018, ConocoPhillips officially requested permission to develop the Willow prospect from the BLM, to construct and operate five drill pads with 50 oil wells each for a total of 250 oil wells including access and infield roads, airstrips, pipelines, a gravel mine and a temporary island to facilitate module delivery via sealift barges.

In August 2019, after a 44-day public scoping period and having consulted with 13 tribal entities and Alaska Native Claims Settlement Act corporations, the BLM published a draft master development plan.

In August 2020, during the last quarter of the Trump administration, the BLM approved the development of the ConocoPhillips project option. It foresees the construction of a new road. Although a roadless option would have aided caribou movements in the area, the BLM in its Willow master development project Record of Decision, published in October 2020, sided against the roadless option, because it felt the increase in air traffic would increase the overall disturbance. ConocoPhillips plans to use thermosiphons to freeze the melting permafrost ground, to keep it solid for the oil development infrastructure. Construction at that time was expected to take about nine years, to employ up to 1,650 seasonal workers, an average of 373 annual workers and about 406 full-time employees once operational.

In August 2021, the U.S. District Court for the District of Alaska challenged the BLM permit for the Willow project, because it "1) improperly excluded analysis of foreign greenhouse gas emissions, 2) improperly screened out alternatives from detailed analysis based on BLM's misunderstanding of leaseholders' rights (i.e., that leases purportedly afforded the right to extract 'all possible' oil and gas from each lease tract), and 3) failed to give due consideration to the requirement in the NPRPA to afford 'maximum protection' to significant surface values in the Teshekpuk Lake Special Area". According to documents received under the Freedom of Information Act, ConocoPhillips was then involved in analyzing the court's decision and participated in developing the next supplemental review.

In July 2022, the BLM released a draft SEIS in response to the District Court order.

In August 2022, the Alaska Native corporation of the village of Nuiqsut submitted comments to the draft SEIS favoring a reduced number of drill pads from five to four, shorter gravel roads and protection of Teshekpuk Lake.

=== Government approval, 2023 ===
On February 1, 2023, the BLM completed the final SEIS, approving the project with three drill pads with 50 oil wells each for a total of 150 oil wells. Alaskan lawmakers from both sides, including the congressional delegation (Senators Lisa Murkowski (R), Dan Sullivan (R) and Representative Mary Peltola (D)), as well as the Arctic Slope Regional Corporation have been supporting the Willow project. As of March 2023, the Department of the Interior permitted ConocoPhillips to build a new ice road from the existing Kuparuk road system at Kuparuk River Oil Field drill site and use a partially grounded ice bridge across the Colville River near Ocean Point "to transport sealift modules" to the Willow project drilling area.

As a final decision drew near, media attention and public interest increased dramatically, with a petition urging President Biden to "say no to the Willow Project", having been signed by more than 2.4 million people after widespread attention on TikTok.

On March 13, 2023, the Biden administration approved the project. Secretary of the Interior Deb Haaland's name did not appear on the approval; deputy secretary Tommy Beaudreau, who acted as the point person on the project for the department, signed the final document. In response, environmental groups announced their plans to sue.

=== Law suits, 2023 ===
On March 14, 2023, environmentalist organization Earthjustice filed a lawsuit on behalf of conservation groups to stop the Willow project. Activists say that the approval of a new carbon pollution source contradicts President Joe Biden's promises to slash greenhouse gas emissions in half by 2030 and transition the United States to clean energy. Some activists have characterized the project as a carbon bomb. In a second lawsuit, on the same day the Natural Resources Defense Council, Center for Biological Diversity, Greenpeace and others asked the federal Alaska court to vacate the approval. Conoco immediately started building the ice road, as construction is only possible in the winter, and in April 2023 an appeals court denied an injunction. In August 2023, a college student from Gen-Z for Change protested against the approval at a White House press event and a video of this event was viewed 10 million times.

In September 2023, Biden cancelled oil and gas leases in the Arctic National Wildlife Refuge, but not for the Willow project.

On November 9, 2023, U.S. District Court Judge Sharon Gleason upheld the Biden administration's approval of the Willow project and rejected claims by an Iñupiat group and environmentalists against it. Earthjustice, one of the organizations bringing the lawsuit, has announced its intention to appeal the decision. In 2025, a federal appeals court did not vacate Biden´s approval but "found flaws with theenvironmental review.

=== Construction 2024-present ===
According to Conoco, during winter 2024/2025 more than 2,400 workers completed 50% of the project, built two bridges, installed 72 miles of pipeline and a year round Willow camp.

== Environmental justice ==
Already in its October 2020 Willow Master Development Plan the BLM had stated: "The effects on subsistence and sociocultural systems may be highly adverse and disproportionately borne by the Nuiqsut population."

In the final SEIS from February 2023, the BLM predicted adverse effects on public health, the subsistence and sociocultural system. The Nuiqsut population would be disproportionately affected with decreased food resource availability, decreased access to harvesting and increased food insecurity. It found the project would also adversely impact other Native American communities in Utqiaġvik, Anaktuvuk Pass, and Atqasuk.

The project could produce up to 600 million barrels of oil and 287 million tons of carbon emissions plus other greenhouse gases over 30 years. The BLM assessments predict the project will adversely impact arctic wildlife and Native American communities "significantly". The Willow project would damage the complex local tundra ecosystem and, according to an older government estimate, release the same amount of greenhouse gases annually as half a million homes.

In June 2023, Alaska regulators proposed that ConocoPhillips receive a $914,000 penalty for its handling of a “shallow underground blowout” of a nearby well in Alpine, Alaska in 2022, as gas was released uncontrollably at the surface for days across various locations.

== See also ==
- Alaska Oil and Gas Conservation Commission
- Exxon Valdez oil spill
- Prudhoe Bay oil spill
