= Tarn Oil Field =

Oil field in Alaska, United States

Tarn oil field
- Location within Alaska
- Country: Alaska
- Coordinates: 70°20′14.06″N 149°50′50.24″W

The Tarn oil field is an oil field in North Slope Borough, Alaska, United States. It is adjacent to the Kuparuk Oil Field, Alaska's second largest oil field.

B.P. America and ARCO Alaska, Inc., first announced the Tarn discovery on 10 March after testing of the Tarn #2 well yielded a steady, stimulated flow rate in excess of 2,000 barrels per day of 38-degree API gravity oil from a sandstone reservoir discovered at a depth of 5,200 feet.

== History ==
In March 1997 oil was found in the Tarn Prospect and plans for Tarn Oil Field Development were announced.

=== See also ===
- Kuparuk Oil Field
