= Arctic Slope Regional Corporation =

Alaska Native land-owning corporation

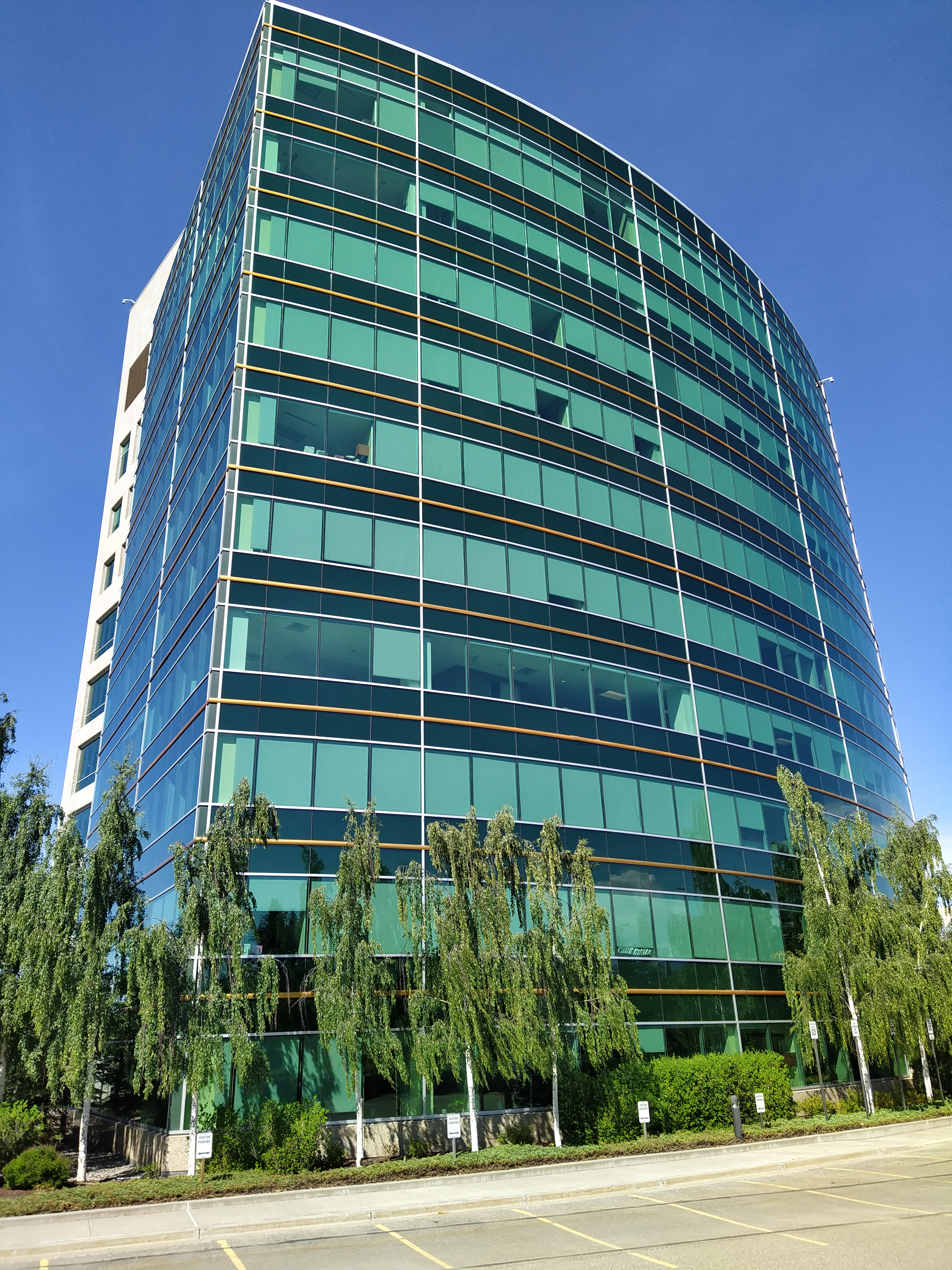
- ASRC offices in midtown Anchorage, 2020
- Type: Private company
- Founded: 1971
- Headquarters: Utqiaġvik, Alaska, U.S.
- Area served: Alaska
- Key people: Crawford Patkotak (chairman); Paul Bodfish Sr. (vice chairman); Charlie Kozak (vice president, chief financial officer); Butch Lincoln (vice president and chief operating officer of the board); Rex A. Rock Sr. (President & CEO)
- Products: Mid-end distillates such as ultra-low sulfur diesel; jet fuel; heating oil
- Services: Government contract services; Petroleum refining and marketing; Energy support services; Industrial services; Construction; Natural resource development
- Revenue: ▲US$3.9 billion (FY2022)
- Operating income: ▲US$ billion (FY2021)
- Net income: ▲US$ billion (FY2021)
- Total assets: ▲US$ billion (FY2021)
- Total equity: ▲US$ billion (FY2021)
- Number of employees: 15,000 (FY2022)
- Subsidiaries: ASRC Federal; ASRC Energy Services; ASRC Industrial Services; ASRC Construction
- Website: asrc.com

Arctic Slope Regional Corporation, or ASRC, is one of 13 Alaska Native Regional Corporations created under the Alaska Native Claims Settlement Act of 1971 (ANCSA) in settlement of aboriginal land claims. ASRC was incorporated in Alaska on June 22, 1972. Headquartered in Utqiaġvik, Alaska, with administrative offices in Anchorage, ASRC was as of 2017, a for-profit corporation with nearly 11,000 Alaska Native shareholders primarily of Iñupiat descent.

== History ==
Arctic Slope Regional Corporation was created under the Alaska Native Claims Settlement Act of 1971. The initial shareholders were the 13,000 Iñupiat listed in the 1970 US census. Since April 1990 ASRC's shareholder base grew from 3,700 shareholders in 1972 to about 14,000 today.

== Operations ==
ASRC is a private for profit corporation, with headquarters in Utqiaġvik, Alaska, and administrative offices in Anchorage. As of 2023, ASRC had 15,000 employees in Alaska and the lower US.

It consists of the following different subsidiaries :

=== ASRC Federal ===
ASRC Federal consists of 19 companies, with more than 8,000 employees in over 40 states across the U.S., which contract U.S. Federal government services. These companies deliver engineering, information technology, infrastructure support, professional and technical services to civil, defense and intelligence agencies: namely ASRC Federal Agile Decision Sciences, ASRC Federal Analytical Services, ASRC Federal Astronautics, ASRC Federal Communications, ASRC Federal Cyber, ASRC Federal Data Network Technologies, ASRC Federal Data Network, ASRC Federal Data Solutions, ASRC Federal Data Networks Corporation, ASRC Federal Field Services, ASRC Federal InuTeq, ASRC Federal Mission Services, ASRC Federal Mission Solutions, ASRC Federal Primus, ASRC Federal Research and Technology Solutions, ASRC Federal Space and Defense, ASRC Federal System Solutions, ASRC Federal Technical Services, and ASRC Federal Vistronix.

=== Petroleum Refining ===
ASRC owns Petro Star Inc., the only Alaskan-owned refining and fuel marketing operation in Alaska with 2 refineries along the Trans-Alaska Pipeline System: the North Pole Refinery and Valdez refinery. It owns the North Pacific Fuel and Sourdough Fuel brands.

=== Oil field services ===
ASRC Energy Services and Little Red Services provide oil field services and employ 2,300 Alaskans alone. They provide hot-oil service, inspecting and flushing oil well tubing and surface lines with fluids to remove accumulated deposits

=== ASRC Industrial ===
ASRC Industrial is based in Tempe, Arizona and comprises three operating groups: 1) Maintenance, Mechanical and Specialty Services, 2) Cleaning, Demolition and Remediation and 3) Engineering, Inspection and Professional Services. These are delivered by 24 companies.

=== ASRC Building ===
ASRC Construction's services fall into four categories: buildings, civil and infrastructure and building materials, delivered by 4 different companies.

=== Others ===
Eskimos, Inc. is a fuel and automotive parts distributor and Top of the World Hotel, a hotel which operates Tundra Tours, Inc. tour programs.

=== Resource development ===
ASRC is one of the largest private landowners in Alaska, with ownership in fee simple of 5 million acres of land. ASRC has a royalty position in the Colville River (Alaska) Unit (CRU), home of the Alpine, Alaska oil field. Alpine field production peaked in November 2005, but as of 2012 CRU satellite developments account for nearly a quarter of the oil production at the Alpine site. Production started in the fourth quarter of 2015 from the new CD-5 drill site, located to access both the Nanuq Kuparuk and the Alpine Participating Areas. Additionally, in late 2015 the Bureau of Land Management issued the remaining outstanding permits providing for development of the Greater Mooses Tooth 1 (GMT1) development. ASRC is the majority subsurface owner for the initial GMT1 development located eight miles west of CD-5.

== Corporate governance ==
ASRC is served by a 15-member board of directors. Seven of the members are residents of Wainwright, Point Lay, Point Hope, Nuiqsut, Anaktuvuk Pass, Atqasuk and Kaktovik, five are from Utqiaġvik, and three are at-large seats.

As of 2023 executive officers were Rex A. Rock Sr., President and CEO, and Butch Lincoln, Executive VP, Chief Operating Officer, Charlie Kozak, Executive VP, Chief Financial Officer and Crawford Patkotak, Executive VP, Stakeholder Engagement. Rock and Lincoln earned nearly 18 million US$ in 2021.

== Revenue ==
After ASRC was created in 1971, it received a share of the $963 million provided by the Alaska Native Claims Settlement Act, plus a number of acres of land in proportion to the size of villages in its region. It was able to define and obtain title to parcels of land without restriction to any former title or land claim. It engaged experts to identify land with significant potential for petroleum, timber, fish, game, and tourist development. Its lands include half of the 429 million-barrel Alpine Oil Field, which started production in 2001.

In 2015, its gross revenue was $2.5 billion. Since inception, it has delivered over $915 million as dividends to shareholders.

Since 2000, it has distributed $90 million to support socioeconomic opportunities in the area, including scholarships and training programs to qualified Iñupiat.

== Subsidiaries ==
=== ASRC Aerospace Corporation ===
ASRC Aerospace Corporation
- Type: Subsidiary
- Industry: Aerospace
- Founded: November 1997
- Headquarters: Greenbelt, Maryland,
- Services: Systems Engineering; Research; Technology Development; Information Management; Space Programs
- Revenue: unknown
- Number of employees: 1,075
- Parent: Arctic Slope Regional Corporation
- Website: ASRC Aerospace

ASRC Aerospace Corporation is a subsidiary of Arctic Slope Regional Corporation (ASRC). ASRC Aerospace is an enterprise formed in November 1997. Headquartered in Greenbelt, Maryland, ASRC Aerospace supports 15 major contracts providing a base of over 1000+ personnel. The company's segments are multiple operating units engaging primarily in U.S. Government contracts.

ASRC Aerospace at one time had about 100 projects at NASA Kennedy Space Center. These projects included studies on lightning strikes and how the associated magnetism could affect launch operations for the shuttle fleet. The company also has designed lightning arresters to protect the Ares rocket, which was planned to replace the Space Shuttle prior to the Obama administration's decision to cancel the Constellation Program. The company also has completed the analysis and design of a concept for an electrostatic shield to protect a lunar base.

ASRC Aerospace is the prime contractor for the university-Affiliated Spaceport Technology Development Contract (USTDC) to design ground support equipment and develop new technologies. The company has been engaged in designing the new mobile launcher and modifying the launch pads. ASRC has also been involved in other scientific research. The USTDC contract expired on October 31, 2010, and future contracts at Kennedy Space Center remain uncertain, given the agency's direction to abandon the Constellation program as well as the scheduled end of the Space Shuttle Program. ASRC Aerospace has laid-off approximately 20% of its workforce in 2010 on the USTDC contract, including subcontractors.

For its work at NASA KSC and other field centers, Florida Lt. Governor Toni Jennings awarded ASRC Aerospace 2006 Florida Space Business Award for leadership in innovative approaches to developing breakthrough technologies for space exploration.

The National Aeronautics and Space Administration (NASA) presented the George M. Low award to ASRC Aerospace Corporation on February 26, 2008, in recognition of sustained, high quality performance in launch site design engineering, project management, technology development, and technical support services.

==== Major Contracts ====
- University-Affiliated Spaceport Technology Development Contract (USTDC), Kennedy Space Center, FL
- Glenn Engineering and Scientific Services (GESS-2), NASA Glenn Research Center in Cleveland, Ohio
- Several contracts for the Department of Defense
- Information Technology Support Contract for the Department of Energy
- USAF Space and Missile Systems Center (SMC) Technical Assistance Support Services (TASS)
- NASA Space Communications Network Services (SCNS)

== Ranking ==
In 2016, ASRC was ranked as the fourth best of 92 oil, gas, and mining companies on indigenous rights in the Arctic.

In 2021, ASRC was ranked as no. 14 most environmentally responsible company out of 120 oil, gas, and mining companies involved in resource extraction north of the Arctic Circle in the Arctic Environmental Responsibility Index.
