= Inupiat Community of the Arctic Slope =

Federally recognized native tribe in Alaska, United States

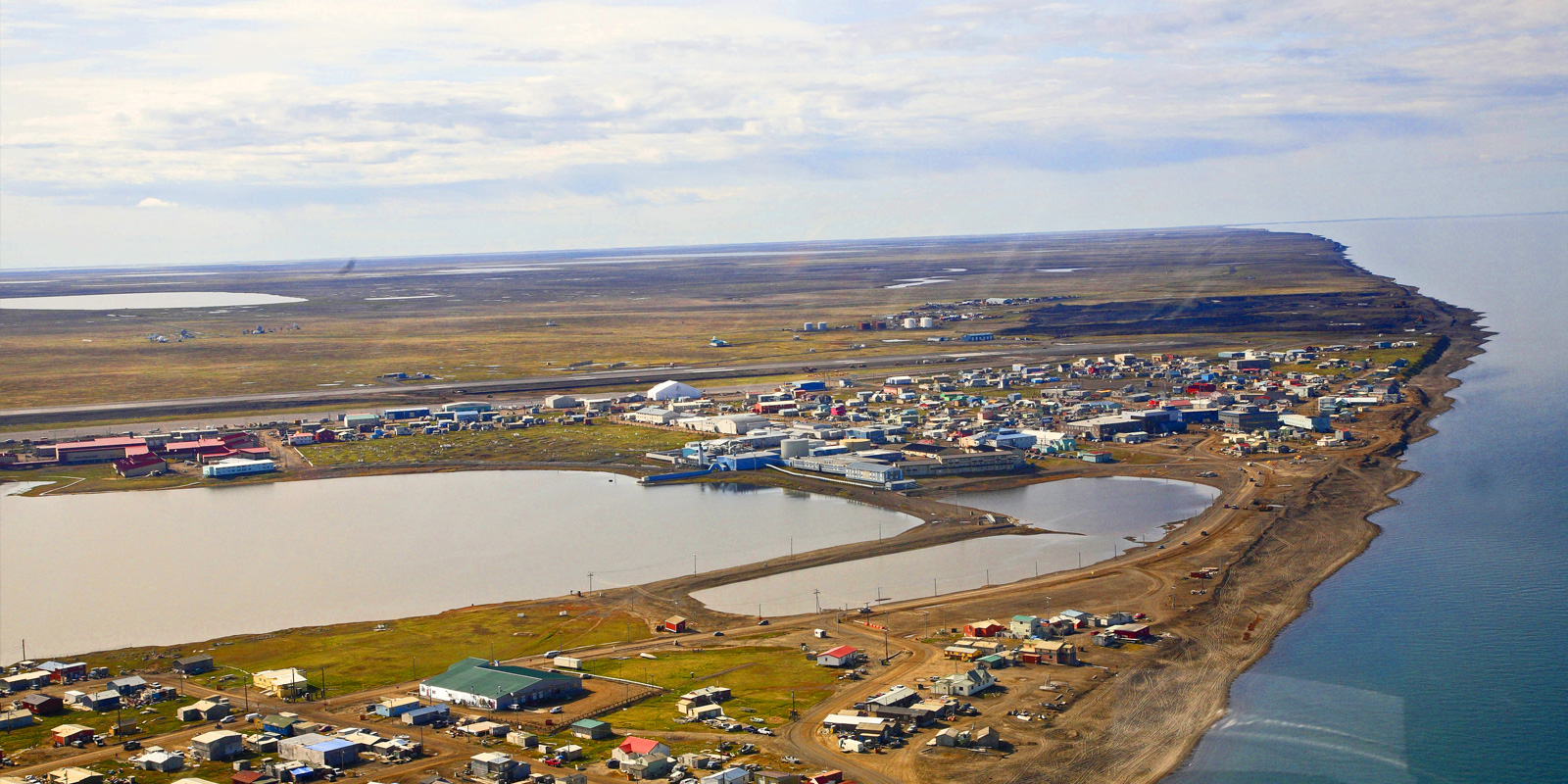
- Aerial photograph of Utqiagvik, Alaska
- People: Iñupiat
- Headquarters: Utqiagvik, Alaska, US

Government
- Chief: George Edwardson

Tribal Council
- ICAS Tribal Council

The Inupiat Community of the Arctic Slope (ICAS) is a United States federally recognized Iñupiat Alaska Native tribal entity, which acts as an "umbrella government" for Native villages in the North Slope Borough, including Point Lay, Point Hope, Wainwright, Anaktuvuk Pass, Utqiagvik (Barrow), Atqasuk, Kaktovik, and Nuiqsut.

== About ==
The Inupiat Community of the Arctic Slope is headquartered in Utqiagvik, Alaska.

In 2023, the Biden administration advanced a $8 billion ConocoPhillips project to drill for oil and gas on Alaska's North Slope. Native reactions to the project have varied, but the Inupiat Community of the Arctic Slope, as a representative of the North Slope, has endorsed the project.

== See also ==
- List of Alaska Native tribal entities
