= Alpine Airstrip =

- IATA: none; ICAO: PALP; FAA LID: AK15

Summary
- Airport type: Private
- Owner: ConocoPhillips Alaska, Inc
- Serves: Deadhorse, Alaska
- Elevation AMSL: 21.4 ft (6.5 m)
- Coordinates: 70°20′39″N 150°56′41″W

Map
- Location of Alpine Airstrip

Runways
Direction	Length		Surface
Direction	ft	m	Surface
3/21	5,000	1,524	Gravel

Statistics
- Enplanements (2007): 786
- Sources: FAA

Alpine Airstrip (ICAO: PALP, FAA LID: AK15) is a private-use airport located 53 nautical miles (98 km) west of the central business district of Deadhorse, in Alpine, North Slope Borough in the U.S. state of Alaska. It is privately owned by ConocoPhillips Alaska, Inc.

As per Federal Aviation Administration records, this airport had 786 passenger boardings (enplanements) in calendar year 2007, an increase of 1915% from the 39 enplanements in 2006.

== Facilities ==
Alpine Airstrip Airport has one runway (3/21) with a gravel surface measuring 5,000 by 100 feet (1,524 x 30 m).

== See also ==
- List of airports in Alaska
