= Lost Temper Creek =

River in the United States of America

Coordinates: 68°54′09″N 157°21′22″W

Location
- Country: United States
- State: Alaska
- Borough: North Slope Borough

Physical characteristics
- Mouth: Colville River

Lost Temper Creek is a stream in North Slope Borough, Alaska, in the United States. It is a tributary of the Colville River.

Lost Temper Creek was named in the 1950s by a government geologist from an unpleasant incident at the explorers' camp. Lost Temper Creek has been noted for its unusual place name.

== See also ==
- List of rivers of Alaska
