= Teshekpuk Lake =

Lake on the coast of Alaska

Coordinates: 70°34′17″N 153°30′51″W

- Tasiqpak (Inupiaq)
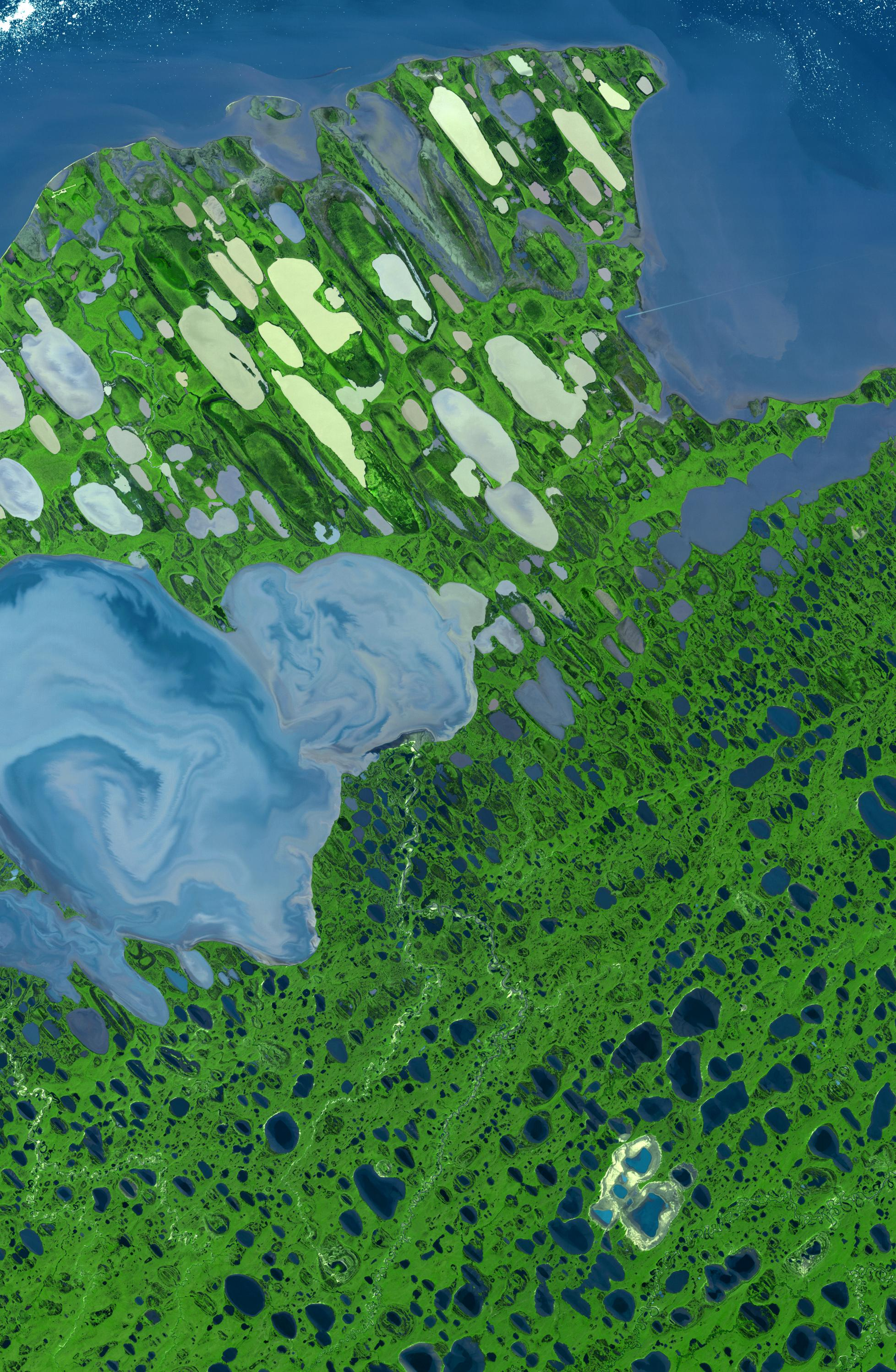
- False-color image of Teshekpuk Lake (on left side of image) and the North Slope. Green indicates vegetation and blue indicates water. Some bodies of water also appear in off-white or yellowish, probably due to different amounts of sediment in the water and/or the sun angle. The Beaufort Sea is at the top of the scene.

- Location within Alaska Location within North America
- Location: North Slope Borough, Alaska
- Basin countries: United States
- Max. width: 22 mi (35 km)
- Surface area: 320 square miles (830 km^{2})
- Surface elevation: 7 ft (2.1 m)

Teshekpuk Lake (Iñupiaq: Tasiqpak) is the largest lake in Arctic Alaska, at 22 miles (35 km) width on the Alaska North Slope within the National Petroleum Reserve-Alaska, South of Pitt Point, 12 miles (19 km) east of Harrison Bay, 80 miles (130 km) east of Point Barrow. The Teshekpuk Lake region is considered one of the most productive, diverse, and sensitive wetland ecosystems in the entire Arctic, habitat to a variety of arctic wildlife, including the resident Teshekpuk Lake caribou herd of 64,000 animals, large numbers of shorebirds and migratory waterfowl, for whom it is an essential part of the East Asian–Australasian Flyway site network.

The lake is threatened by salt water contamination from disappearing sea ice, as well as oil drilling in Alpine, Alaska, and by ConocoPhilipps Willow project.

== Etymology ==
Its name comes from the Iñupiaq language Tasiqpak, recorded by Rochfort Maguire as Tasok-poh in 1854, and reported to mean "big lagoon", "big enclosed coastal water" or "big coastal lake". It is also known as Lake Teshekpuk, Tasekpuk Lake, Tasirkpuk Lake, Tasyukpun and Tasiqpak.

== Geography ==
Teshekpuk Lake is a 22 miles (35 km) wide lake on the Alaska North Slope within the National Petroleum Reserve-Alaska. It is South of Pitt Point, 12 miles (19 km) east of Harrison Bay, 80 miles (130 km) east of Point Barrow. Teshekpuk Lake is the largest lake in Arctic Alaska, and the largest thermokarst lake in the world.

== Environment ==
North Slopes Alaska

The Teshekpuk Lake region is considered one of the most productive, diverse, and sensitive wetland ecosystems in the entire Arctic, habitat to a variety of arctic wildlife, including the resident Teshekpuk Lake caribou herd (64,000 animals), large numbers of shorebirds and migratory waterfowl and several freshwater and anadromous fish species. Fish species include broad whitefish (Coregonus nasus), Arctic grayling (Thymallus arcticus), Burbot (Lota lota), Arctic cisco (Coregonus autumnalis), lake trout (Salvelinus namaycush), Dolly Varden (Salvelinus malma), Chinook salmon (Oncorhynchus tshawytscha) and chum salmon (Oncorhynchus keta).

The lake is part of the East Asian–Australasian Flyway site network. While the lake covers just 18 percent of the National Petroleum Reserve-Alaska, it hosts more than 40 percent of all aquatic birds visiting the Alaska North Slope.

In 1963, the Teshekpuk Lake research station was established. In 2007, the observatory was reestablished with research projects funded by National Science Foundation, U.S. Geological Survey, Bureau of Land Management, European Space Agency, and European Union. It studies impacts of climate change on the arctic environment, permafrost dynamics and thermokarst, lake ice systems, coastal and lake shoreline erosion, aquatic and terrestrial ecology, near-surface geophysics, and paleoecological studies.

In July 2007, a study reported that the disappearance of sea ice near Teshekpuk Lake has been causing rapid erosion in the marshy, wildlife-rich area. In some places, the sea has pushed in half a mile and salt water has contaminated freshwater lakes. Migratory birds, caribou and other wildlife populations have lost habitat, and the sparse human infrastructure along the coastline has been damaged. According to Stan Senner, executive director of Audubon Alaska, "The area (Teshekpuk Lake) is one of the most important areas in the entire Arctic, and I don't just mean in Arctic Alaska...It is simply the most important goose-molting area in the Arctic."

== Oil drilling controversy ==
On January 11, 2006, the U.S. Department of the Interior (DOI) approved oil and gas drilling on approximately 500,000 acres (2,000 km^{2}) of land in and around Teshekpuk Lake.

Up to 90,000 geese congregate in this area in summer to undergo wing molt, and up to 46,000 caribou use the area for both calving and migration. Some environmental groups contested the DOI decision to allow drilling; these included National Audubon Society, Alaska Wilderness League, Center for Biological Diversity, Natural Resources Defense Council, Northern Alaska Environmental Center, Sierra Club, and The Wilderness Society. The decision stipulated that no surface drilling would be allowed on land considered crucial for molting geese or caribou, and a maximum of 2,100 acres (8.5 km^{2}) in seven different zones could be permanently disturbed on the surface.

On September 25, 2006, the U.S. District Court for the District of Alaska issued a decision that removed the wildlife habitat around Teshekpuk Lake from an oil and gas lease sale that was held on September 27. The court found that the U.S. government's environmental analysis had violated federal environmental laws. The ruling struck down the Interior Department's leasing plan for the area, prohibiting the Bureau of Land Management (BLM) from leasing more than 400,000 acres (1,600 km^{2}) around the lake.

Prior to the decision, led by a coalition of environmental organizations and Alaskan Natives, U.S. citizens sent over 300,000 comments to the Secretary of Interior and the CEO of ConocoPhillips.

Environmentalists and the region's Iñupiat have also cited the impacts of global climate change as a reason to oppose drilling in land near Teshekpuk Lake.

As Teshekpuk Lake will be affected by the ConocoPhilips Willow project, the Alaska Native corporation of the village of Nuiqsut suggested its protection in August 2022.

Protection of the lake and areas near it from oil and gas leases is again taken up in court cases in 2026.

== See also ==
- List of lakes of Alaska
- Arctic Refuge drilling controversy

== Notes ==
=== References ===
- LakeNet Profile
