= Native Village of Nuiqsut =

Federally recognized Alaska Native tribe

- People: Iñupiat
- Headquarters: Nuiqsut, Alaska, US

Government
- Chief: Margaret Pardue

Tribal Council
- Nuiqsut Tribal Council

The Native Village of Nuiqsut (also known as Nooiksut) is a federally recognized Iñupiat Alaska Native tribal entity.

== About ==
The Native Village of Nuiqsut is headquartered in Nuiqsut, Alaska. As of 2005, the tribe had 450 enrolled citizens.

== See also ==
- List of Alaska Native tribal entities
