= Marotta =

American manufacturing company

Marotta Controls Incorporated
- Type: Private
- Industry: Aerospace; Defense; Space
- Founded: 1943, Montville, New Jersey
- Headquarters: Montville, NJ
- Products: Software; Motor controller Control actuation systems Electronics, Actuators; Pneumatics, Hydraulics; Regulators, Valves; Smart Valves; Manifolds; Power supplies Power supply and conversion Solenoid valves
- Website: www.marotta.com

Founded in 1943, Marotta Controls, Inc. is one of the technology businesses in New Jersey, specializing in the design, manufacture and integration of precision control components and systems. It offers valves, manifolds, power conversion, motor drives and control actuation systems for military and commercial applications.

== History ==
Marotta was founded in 1943 as The Marotta Engineering Company. Early manufacturing sub-contracts for prime contractors such as General Electric Corporation and RCA enabled Marotta to gain experience in what was to become a particular area of expertise – precision valves and machined components for the rocket and guided missile industry.

== Locations ==
- Marotta Corporate Headquarters
  - Montville, Morris County, New Jersey, United States
