= National Petroleum Reserve–Alaska =

Largest single piece of public protected land in the United States

Coordinates: 70°N 157°W

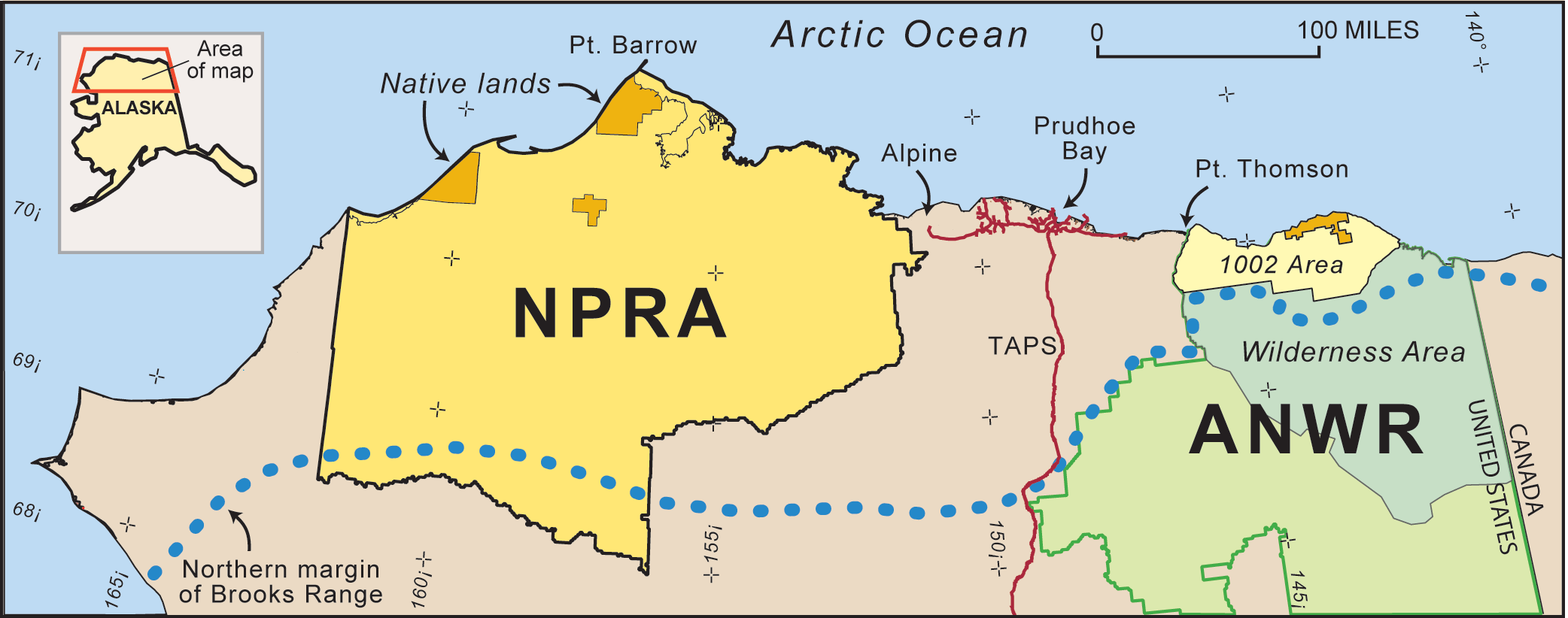
A map of northern Alaska showing the location of the National Petroleum Reserve-Alaska (NPRA).

The National Petroleum Reserve in Alaska (NPRA) is an area of land on the Alaska North Slope owned by the United States federal government and managed by the Department of the Interior's Bureau of Land Management (BLM). It lies to the west of the Arctic National Wildlife Refuge, which, as a U.S. Fish and Wildlife Service managed National Wildlife Refuge, is also federal land.

At a size of 23,599,999 acres (95,506 square kilometres; 36,875 square miles), the NPRA is the largest tract of undisturbed public land in the United States. Iñupiat live in several villages around its perimeter, the largest of which is Utqiaġvik, the seat of the North Slope Borough. Due to the proximity of Inuit communities and the ecological importance of the NPRA for arctic wildlife, drilling on the NPRA has sparked controversy revolving around the economic, ecological, and cultural importance of the land.

== Ecological importance ==
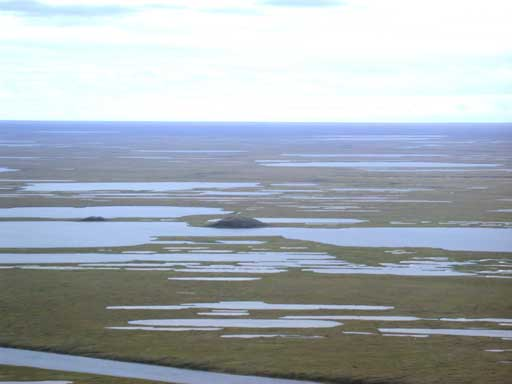
A picture of the NPRA area looking very similar to a more southern wetland.

The NPRA is an ecologically important area for numerous species. Permanent human settlements are small and rare, populated by Alaska Native communities, primarily the Iñupiat, living subsistence lifestyles.

The NPRA is particularly important for many species of birds and has been referred to as "Heathrow at the top of the world" due to the high volume of migratory birds that travel to the NPRA each spring to mate, lay eggs, and raise chicks before dispersing around the world again. The NPRA is home to Teshekpuk Lake, an important nesting ground for many of these species, including shorebirds and waterfowl, and supports the greatest population of aquatic birds out of any major Arctic wetland. The NPRA's aquatic bird population is higher than that of the Arctic Wildlife Refuge, with a population of 5.4 million compared to 400,000.

The NPRA also supports more than half a million caribou belonging to the Western Arctic and Teshekpuk Caribou Herds. The Western Arctic Herd calves in the Utukok, Kokolik and Colville uplands, while the Teshekpuk Herd calves in the areas surrounding Teshekpuk Lake. The caribou are predated by grizzly bears, wolves and wolverines, as well as local hunters participating in subsistence hunting. The area is also a habitat for maternal denning of polar bears in the winter, an essential part of newborn cub development.

NPRA contains the headwaters and much of the Colville River, Alaska's largest river north of the Arctic Circle. The region's geology is unique in Alaska, and most of the area remained glacier-free throughout the last ice age.

== History ==
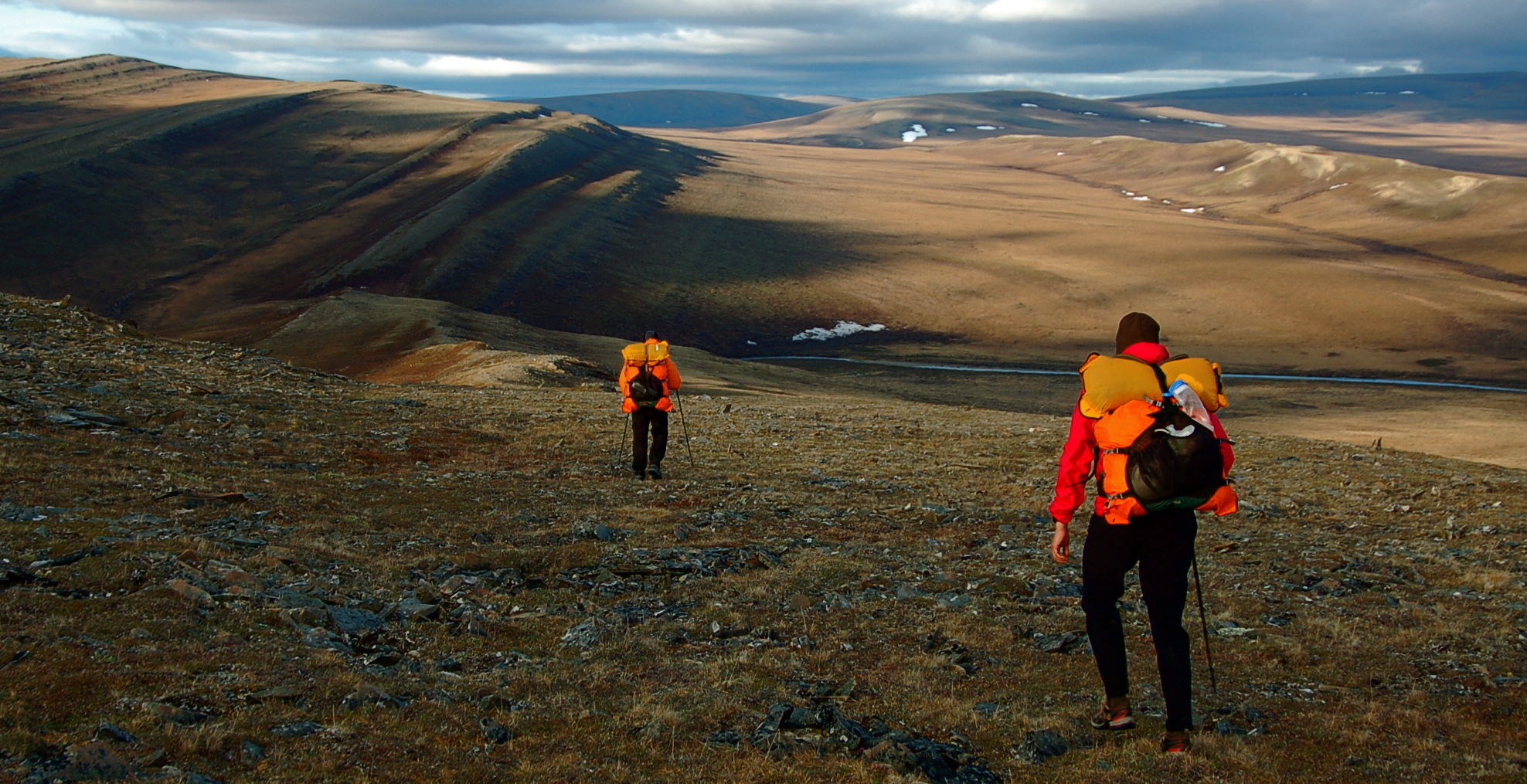
Syncline ridges in southwestern NPRA.

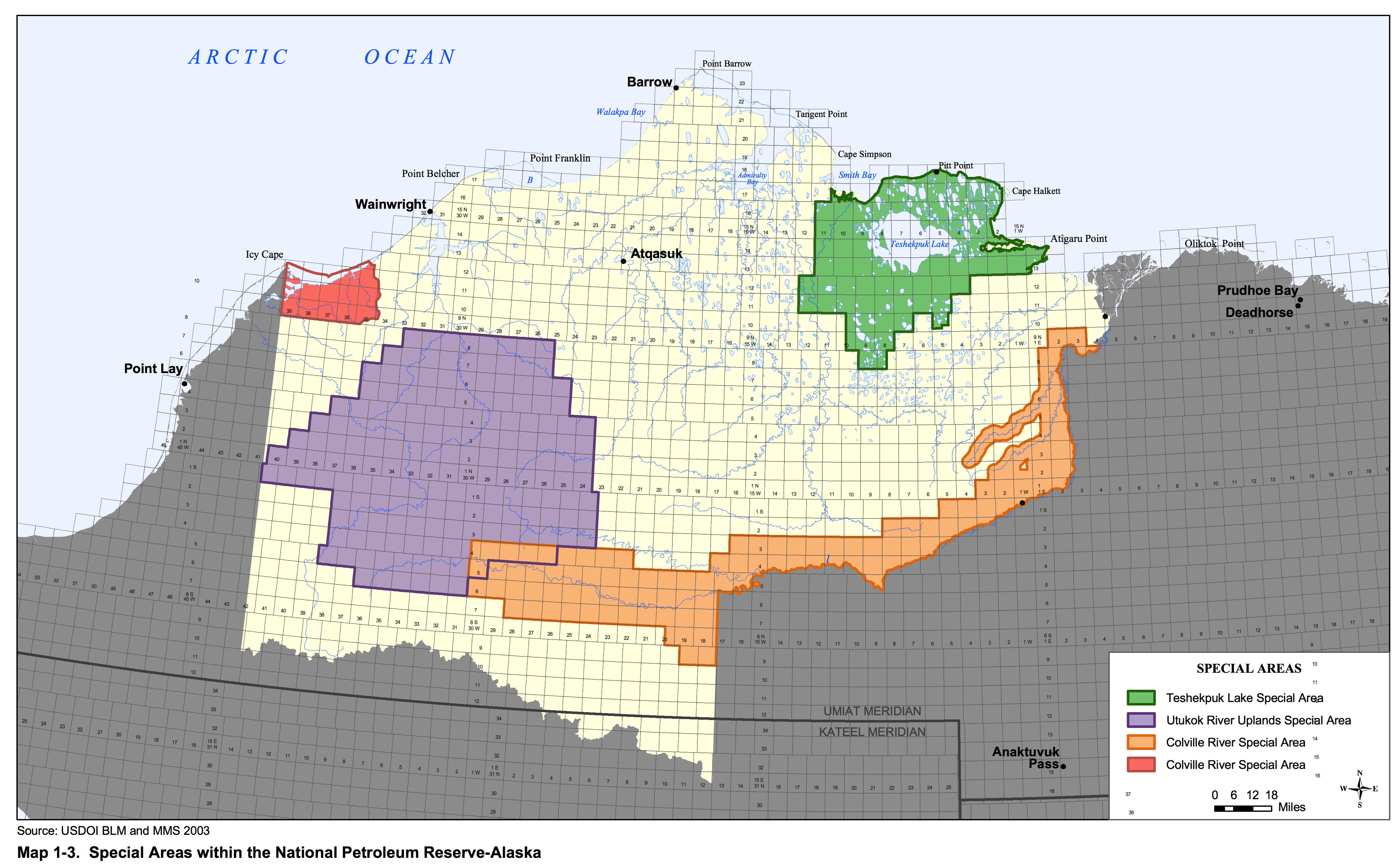
Special areas in the NPRA

The NPRA was created by President Warren G. Harding in 1923 as Naval Petroleum Reserve Number 4 during a time when the United States was converting its Navy to run on oil rather than coal. In 1976 the Naval Petroleum Reserves Production Act (NPRPA) renamed the reserve the "National Petroleum Reserve in Alaska" and transferred it from the Navy to the Department of the Interior. The 1980 Interior Department Appropriations Act directed the Bureau of Land Management (BLM) within the Department of Interior to conduct oil and gas leasing. Nevertheless, the area was left essentially as a wilderness until the late 1990s.

The NPRPA also contains provisions that apply to any exploration or production activities within areas "designated by the Secretary of the Interior containing any significant subsistence, recreational, fish and wildlife, or historical or scenic value". Based on this authority, the Secretary in 1977 designated three Special Areas within the NPRA in which all activities were to "be conducted in a manner which will assure the maximum protection of such surface values to the extent consistent with the requirements of this Act for the exploration of the reserve." The Teshekpuk Lake Special Area was created to protect migratory waterfowl and shorebirds. The Colville River Special Area was created to protect the arctic peregrine falcon, which at that time was an endangered species. The Utukok River Uplands Special Area was created to protect critical habitat for caribou of the Western Arctic Herd. The Secretary of the Interior enlarged the Teshekpuk Lake and Colville River Special Areas in the Northeast NPRA Record of Decision of 1998. In 2003, a committee of the National Research Council published a report that urged caution in granting oil and gas leases, in that oil and gas extraction in the reserve may cause permanent and irreversible environmental damage. In 2004, the Secretary created the Kasegaluk Lagoon Special Area.

Between 1944 and 1981, the US government drilled and then abandoned about 137 wells in the reserve as part of an exploratory oil and gas program in order to obtain estimates and locations of reservoirs. BLM operates the abandoned wells. In 1998, after BLM had gone through a planning process to create an "Integrated Activity Plan/Environmental Impact Statement" for the Northeast area, the Secretary of Interior signed a record of decision (ROD), which opened 87 percent of this area to oil and gas leasing and the first leases were signed in 1999. An ROD for the Northwest area was signed in 2004. BLM began the planning process for the South in 2005. The 2003 USGS survey had indicated the best prospects for large reserves were just east of Teshekpuk Lake - a Special Area in the Northeast, and in 2006, the Bush administration attempted to lease land in the habitat around Teshekpuk Lake. Six conservation groups sued to prevent the leases and won. The litigation forced BLM to create a new plan for the entire reserve. The final ROD for the entire region, including the South, was signed by the Secretary in February 2013.

As of October 2012, a total of 1,374,583 acres (556,274 ha) have been leased; 872,125 acres (352,936 ha) in the Northeast region, and 502,458 acres (203,338 ha) in the Northwest region.

In March 2012, the Alaska House and Senate passed legislation urging the Bureau of Land Management to plug the abandoned wells from the US government exploratory program; the resolution said just seven wells have been properly plugged and reclaimed and that the wells are an eyesore and are harming the environment.

== Oil and gas reserves ==
An assessment by the United States Geological Survey (USGS) in 2008 estimated that the amount of oil yet to be discovered in the NPRA is only one-tenth of what was believed to be there in the previous assessment, completed in 2002. The 2008 USGS estimate says the NPRA contains approximately "896 million barrels of conventional, undiscovered oil". The reason for the decrease is because of new exploratory drilling, which showed that many areas that were believed to hold oil actually hold natural gas.

The estimates of the amount of undiscovered natural gas in the region also fell, from "61 trillion cubic feet of undiscovered, conventional, non-associated gas" in the 2002 estimate, to 53 trillion cubic feet (1,500 km^{3}) in the 2010 estimate.

Oil and gas leases are authorized under the National Petroleum Reserves Production Act of 1976. ConocoPhillips was issued leases in 1999.

== Drilling controversy ==
On March 13, 2023, the Biden administration approved the Willow Project, allowing leases for oil company ConocoPhillips to drill on the NPR-A. The project approval came after Biden established he would not allow more drilling on federal lands, making some supporters angry, while others had been pushing for the project's approval. Willow Project development will include the construction of a gravel mine, hundreds of miles of roads, pipelines, and a facility for processing the oil. This development will occur in the Arctic tundra and wetlands. Due to the disruption to the North Slope environment, it has incited a legal battle from environmental groups opposing drilling.

Alaskan communities also heavily rely on the oil industry for their local economies. Debates over whether to welcome oil development into the community or not have caused a divide. Numerous Iñupiat members have voiced support for the Willow Project because it creates many jobs and a source of revenue. Doreen Leavitt, Director of Natural Resources for the Inupiat Community of the Arctic Slope, described the Willow Project as an economic "lifeline" for North Slope communities. Opponents counterargue that the economic benefits will only be viable in the short-term, while the environmental consequences will be long-term.

Native Alaskan communities reside on the North Slope and are impacted by both the effects of past drilling projects and the threat of future projects. The community of Nuiqsut, which is majority Iñupiat, has found that oil extraction hinders their subsistence practices. This threatens their cultural ties to the land. Oil extraction also results in degradation of the region's air quality. Local communities including the Utqiagvik have faced impacts from petroleum spills such as polycyclic aromatic hydrocarbon (PAH) contamination. In 2012 the Repsol blowout from an exploration well left residual pollution impacting the local Nuiqsut residents. Former Nuiqsut mayor Rosemary Ahtuangaruak expressed concern with oil extraction in the North Slope and how "communities in the Arctic are left to contend with the health impacts of pollution as well as the devastation that comes from dramatic changes to the land like sea ice melt, permafrost thaw, and coastal erosion."

Drilling has also sparked controversy from environmental groups due to its ecological impacts. Research has shown a number of impacts drilling has on the North Slope environment. These include:

- Disruption of caribou populations which are also utilized by Inuit populations for subsistence hunting. Human activity, such as construction in the North Slope, is a threat to the caribou populations.
- Effects on polar bears by causing them to abandon their young before they are old enough to survive. Polar Bears are a threatened species under the Endangered Species Act, so disruptions to their populations are carefully considered during environmental assessments.
- Past oil spills and the threat of future spills that damage local ecosystems, including contaminating the land and water.
- Pollution from "legacy wells" that were built on the NPRA between 1944 and 1981 and were abandoned without proper closure. Inactive wells can contaminate groundwater, soil, and surface water.
- Air pollutants from oil extraction and production.

== See also ==
- Arctic policy of the United States
- Arctic Refuge drilling controversy
- Natural resources of the Arctic
