= Oil Search =

Oil and gas exploration company

- Type: Dual listed
- Traded as: ASX: OSH
- Industry: Petroleum
- Founded: 1929
- Defunct: December 2021
- Headquarters: Port Moresby, Papua New Guinea
- Key people: Richard Lee (Chairman); Kieran Wulff (Managing Director)
- Services: Oil & gas exploration
- Revenue: US$ 1.1 billion (2020)
- Operating income: (US$ 175 million) (2020)
- Net income: (US$ 321 million) (2020)
- Website: www.oilsearch.com

Oil Search was the largest oil and gas exploration and development company incorporated in Papua New Guinea, which operated all of the country's oilfields. In December 2021, it merged with Santos.

== History ==
Oil Search was incorporated in Port Moresby on 17 January 1929. It was one of Papua New Guinea's largest companies, and in 2006 was responsible for 13% of Papua New Guinea's gross domestic product. It was publicly listed on the Port Moresby Stock Exchange and Australian Securities Exchange. It had a market capitalization of around US$12 billion.

A 17.6% interest in the company was held by the Government of Papua New Guinea, The company also operates areas in Yemen, Egypt, Libya, and the Kurdistan region of Iraq. In May 2014, ExxonMobil shipped the first cargo of liquefied natural gas (LNG) from the US$19 billion PNG LNG Project, in which Oil Search owns a 29% interest.

In 2021, Oil Search agreed terms with Santos to merge, with Oil Search shareholders taking a 38.5% shareholding in Santos. The merger took effect on 14 December 2021.
