= Colville River (Alaska) =

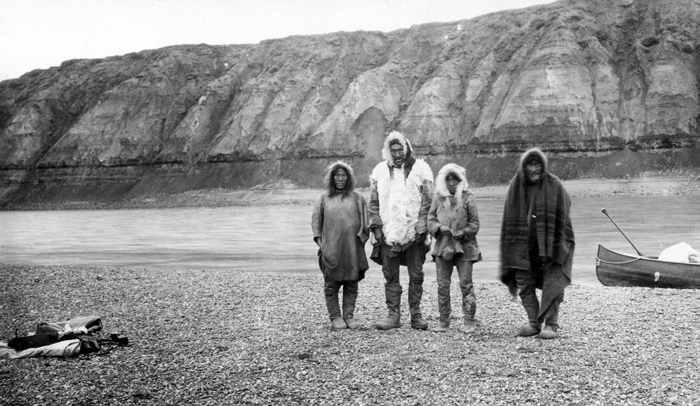
- Inupiat family on Colville River, 1901

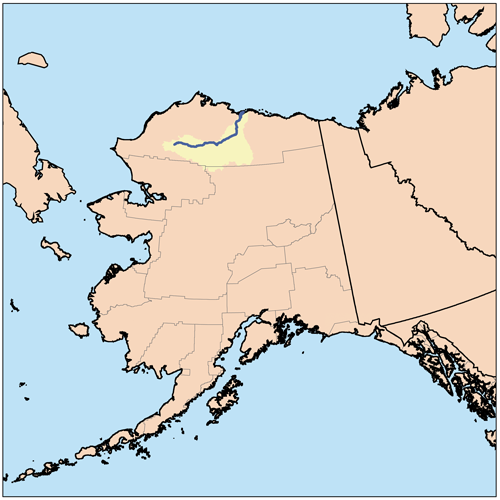
- Colville River course and drainage basin in northern Alaska.

Location
- Country: United States
- State: Alaska
- Borough: North Slope

Physical characteristics
- Source: Confluence of Thunder and Storm creeks
  - location: North slope of the De Long Mountains
  - coordinates: 68°49′01″N 160°21′14″W
  - elevation: 2,017 ft (615 m)
- Mouth: Harrison Bay, Beaufort Sea, Arctic Ocean
  - location: Northeast of Nuiqsut
  - coordinates: 70°26′46″N 150°21′28″W
  - elevation: 0 ft (0 m)
- Length: 350 mi (560 km)
- Basin size: 20,500 sq mi (53,000 km^{2})
- Discharge
  - location: Umiat, Alaska
  - average: 10,192 cu ft/s (288.6 m^{3}/s)
  - maximum: 268,000 cu ft/s (7,600 m^{3}/s)

The Colville River (/ˈkoʊlvɪl/; Inupiat: Kuukpik) is a major river of the Arctic Ocean coast of Alaska in the United States, approximately 350 miles (560 km) long. One of the northernmost major rivers in North America, it drains a remote area of tundra on the north side of the Brooks Range entirely above the Arctic Circle in the southwestern corner of the National Petroleum Reserve-Alaska. The river is frozen for more than half the year and floods each spring.The Colville River and its adjacent hills are home to a variety of Arctic wildlife, including Lake Teshekpuk and Central Arctic caribou herds, and hawks.

As of March 2023, the Department of Interior permitted ConocoPhillips to build a new ice road from Kuparuk River Oil Field drill site and use a partially grounded ice bridge across the Colville River near Ocean Point "to transport sealift modules" to its Willow project oil drilling area.

== Location ==
It rises on the north slope of the De Long Mountains, at the western end of the Brooks Range, north of the continental divide in the southwestern corner of the National Petroleum Reserve-Alaska. It flows initially north, then generally east through the foothills on the north side of the range, broadening as it receives the inflow of many tributaries that descend from the middle Brooks Range. Along its middle course it forms the southeastern border of the National Petroleum Reserve. At the Iñupiat village of Umiat it turns north to flow across the Arctic plain, entering the western Beaufort Sea in a broad delta near Nuiqsut, approximately 120 mi (190 km) west of Prudhoe Bay.

Measuring about 20 by 23 by 26 miles (32 by 37 by 42 km), the river's triangular delta includes 34 distributaries, each with its own mouth, at normal water stages. During high water, the number of distributaries may reach 5,000. The largest distributary is the Nechalic Channel, which flows through Nuiqsut.

According to the United States Geological Survey, in 1837 British explorers P. W. Dease and Thomas Simpson named the river for Andrew Colvile, whose last name they spelled "Colville".

== Geology, infrastructure ==
The river valley contains developed and undeveloped petroleum and natural gas deposits. In 2015, construction was completed on a bridge spanning the Colville River north of Nuiqsut, making it the first major river crossing north of the Arctic Circle in North America. The bridge, at a cost of $100 million, gives its owner ConocoPhillips access to petroleum resources further West in the National Petroleum Reserve-Alaska.

== Demographics ==
Historical population
Census	Pop.	Note	%±
1880	50		—
1940	86		—
U.S. Decennial Census

Colville River first appeared on the 1880 U.S. Census as an unincorporated area of Inuit (all 50 reported as such). It did not specify where along the river they settled. It did not report again until 1940 when it was erroneously called "Coleville River" on the census. It also did not specify where the residents lived.

== Wildlife ==
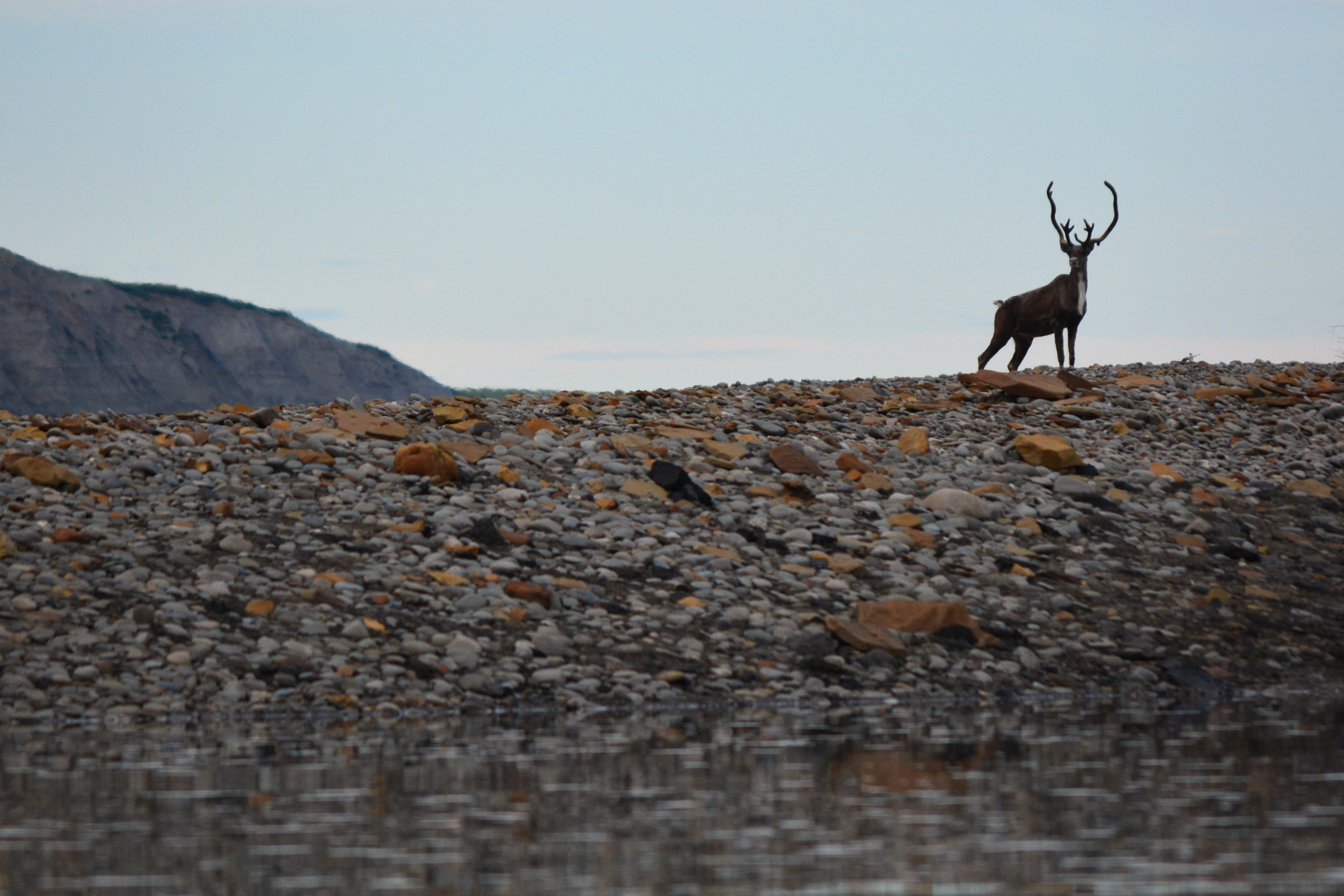
A caribou standing on the banks of the Colville River. Thousands of caribou live on or around the river during the summer months, and provide a traditional source of subsistence food for the region's Iñupiat communities.

The Colville River and its adjacent hills are home to a variety of Arctic wildlife. The Colville runs through the range of the Lake Teshekpuk and Central Arctic caribou herds, making it a landmark and obstacle in one of the world's largest animal migrations. It is also home to brown bears and, nearer the Arctic coast, polar bears.

The Colville River has been called "hawk heaven" for its incredible concentration of peregrine falcons, gyrfalcons, and golden eagles. The steep, loose bluffs of the Colville River provide prime nesting habitat for many birds.

== Paleontology ==
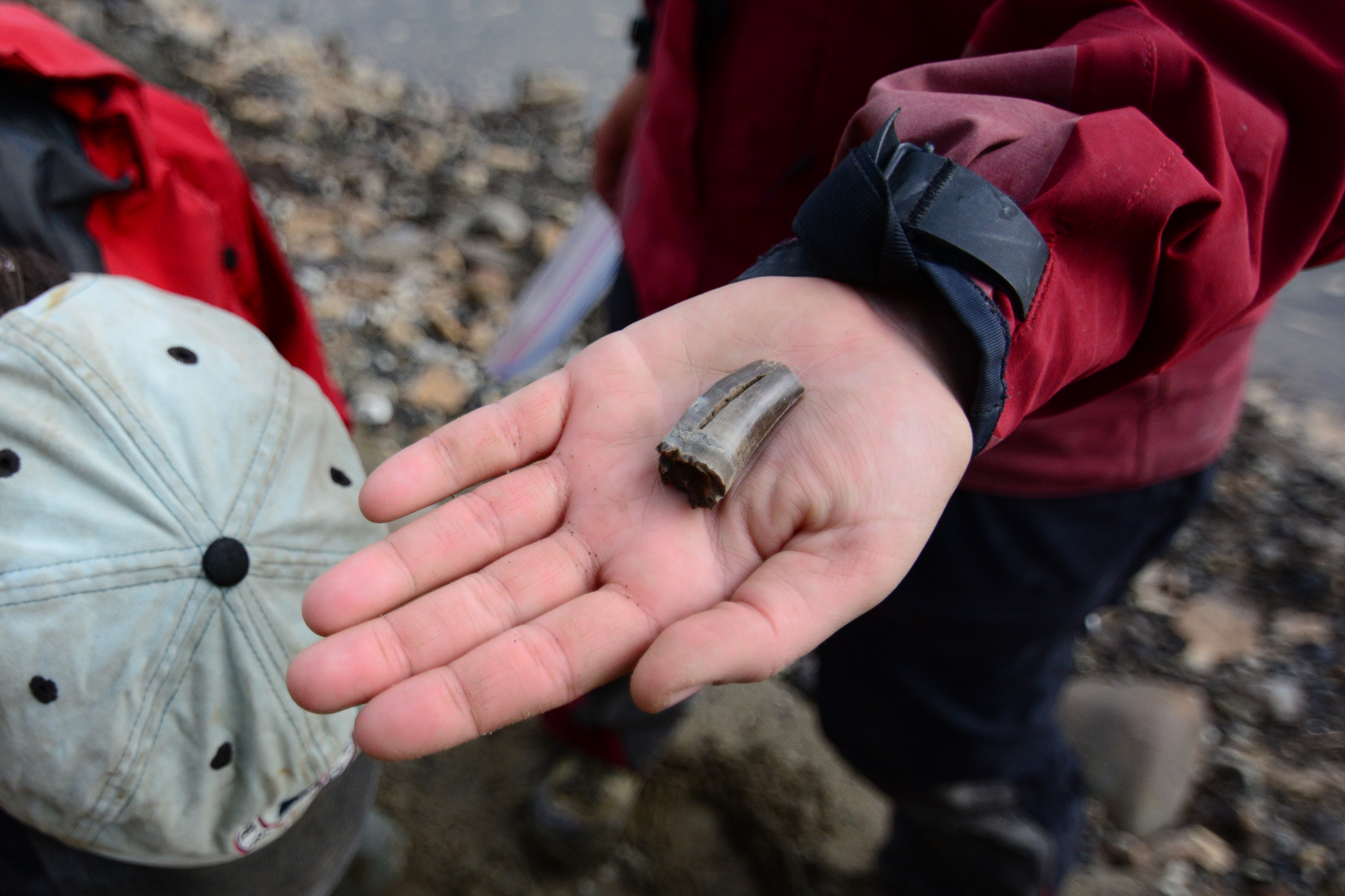
A paleontologist holds a newly discovered fossil dinosaur tooth on the Colville River. Annual erosion of the crumbling Colville River bluffs causes fossils to spill onto the riverbanks every year. A scientific government-issued permit is required for fossil collection.

In 1961, Shell Oil geologist Robert Liscomb discovered dinosaur fossils at multiple locations while surveying the Colville River. However, his discoveries were met with incredulity and suspicion in the paleontology community due to the site's extreme northern location, and Liscolm died the following year in a rock slide while continuing his surveying of the Colville. In the mid- to late-1980s, Liscolm's notes were rediscovered and paleontologists returned to Liscolm's sites only to find many more dinosaur fossils and tracks. Today, the Colville River bluffs are widely recognized as one of the fossil-rich regions in the Arctic, with enormous quantities of Cretaceous dinosaur fossils. Specimens collected on the Colville include theropods, ankylosaurs, albertosaurus, pachyrhinosaurus, gorgosaurus, and hadrosaurs.

Fossils, which are legally described as any sign or remnant of ancient life, may only be collected from public lands with a government-issued permit. Illegally removing fossils from the Colville River, or other public lands, can expose a violator to steep fines or jail time.

== Human activity ==
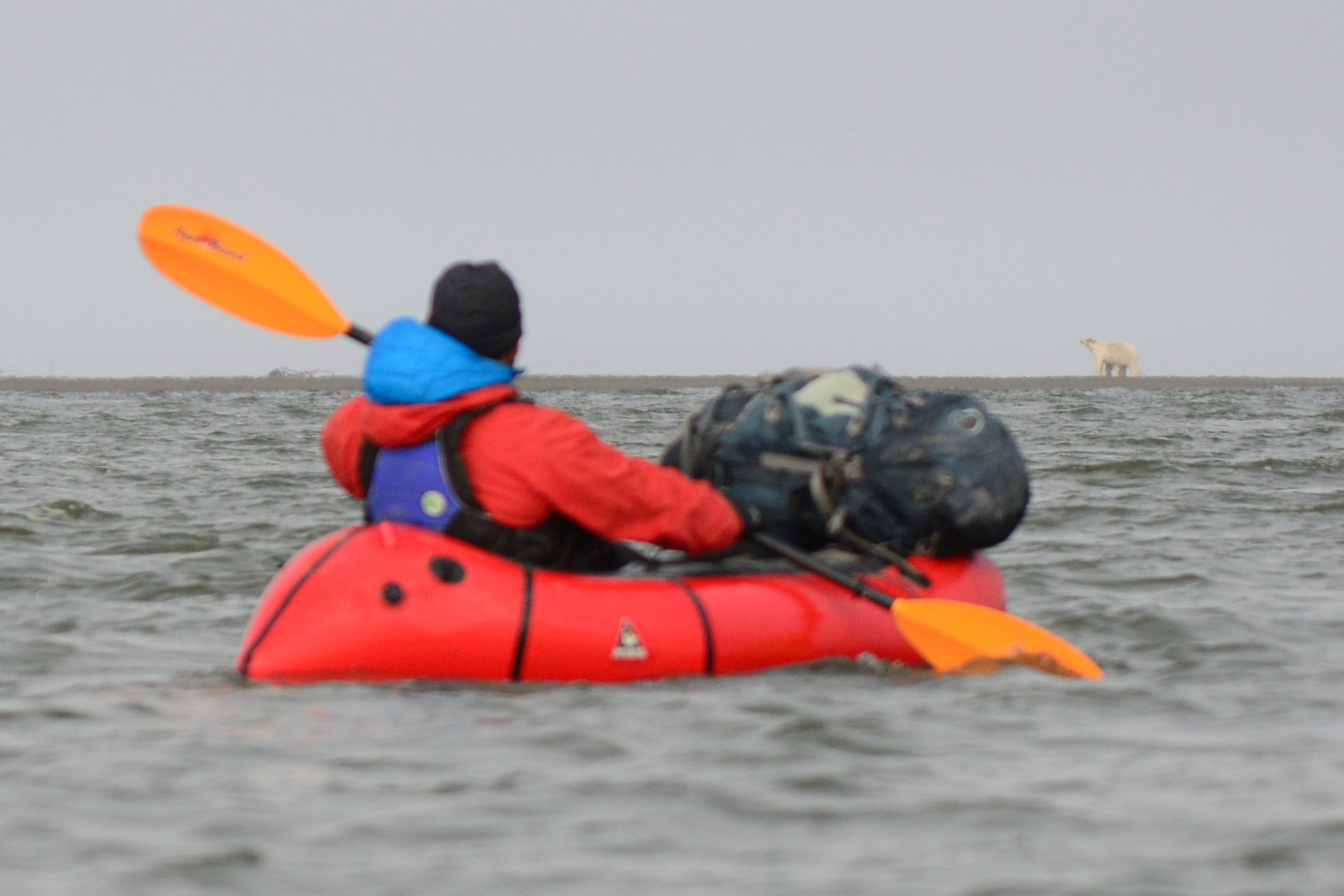
Packrafter floating near a polar bear on the Colville River delta, 2013.

In a region with virtually no roads, the Colville River serves as one of the transportation arteries in the Alaska arctic. In the summer, small motorboats transport indigenous subsistence hunters, paleontologists, geologists, and others working or hunting in the region.

When the river freezes to a suitable thickness during winter, it can be used as an ice road to bring in supplies, as seen during the fourth season of the History Channel series Ice Road Truckers.

A very small number of recreational boaters float the Colville annually, though the extreme remoteness, harsh conditions, relative lack of air transportation hubs, and presence of polar bears make recreational boating challenging.

As of March 2023, the Department of Interior permitted ConocoPhillips to build a new ice road from the existing Kuparuk road system at Kuparuk River Oil Field drill site and use a partially grounded ice bridge across the Colville River near Ocean Point "to transport sealift modules" to its Willow project oil drilling area.

== Tributaries ==
- Lost Temper Creek

== See also ==
- List of rivers of Alaska
