= Nuiqsut, Alaska =

City in Alaska, United States

Nuiqsut Nuiqsat
- City
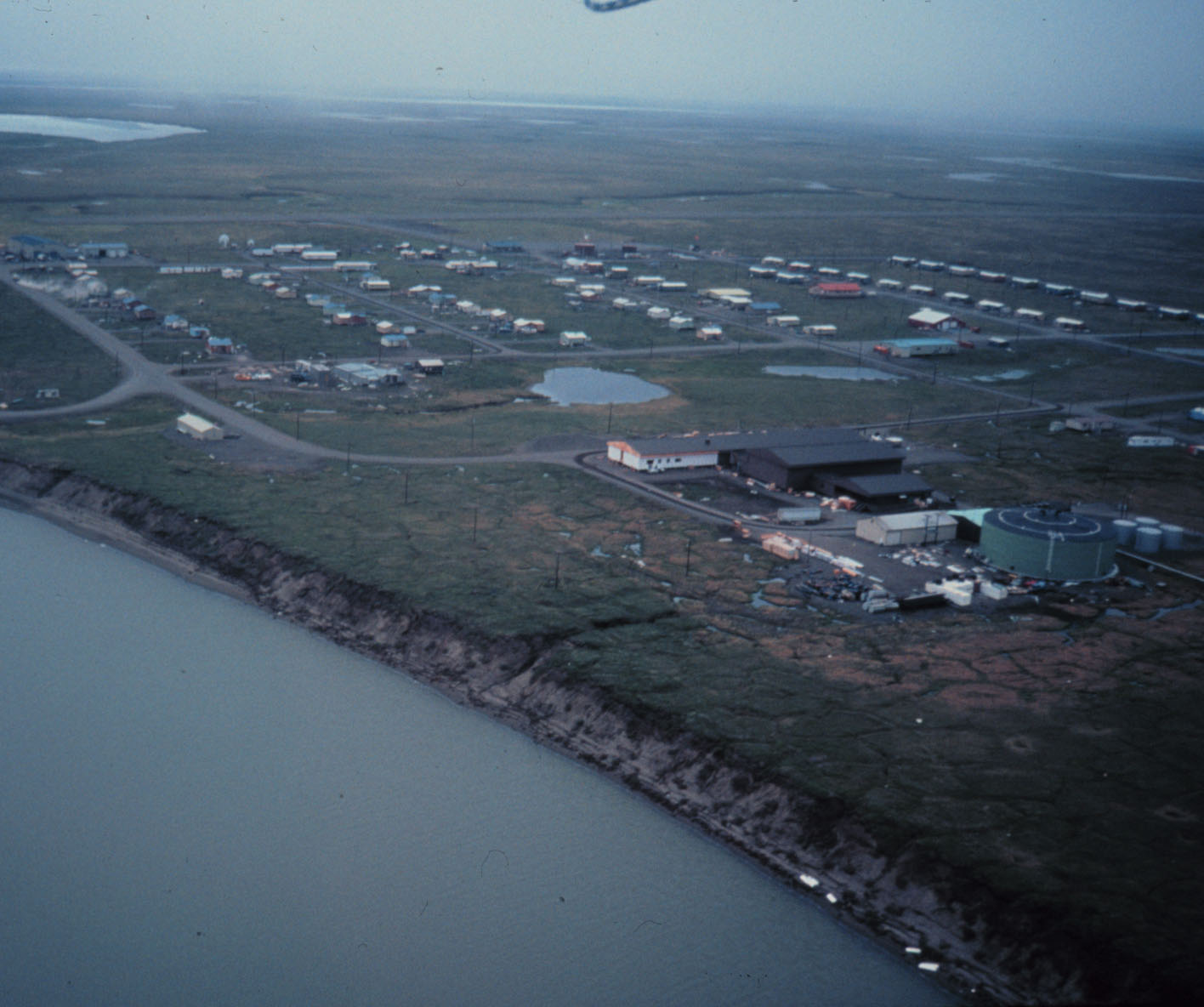
- An aerial view of Nuiqsut

- Seal

- Location in Alaska
- Coordinates: 70°12′59″N 151°00′21″W
- Country: United States
- State: Alaska
- Borough: North Slope
- Incorporated: June 24, 1975

Government
  - Mayor: Lillian Kaigelak
  - State senator: Donny Olson (D)
  - State rep.: Robyn Burke (D)

Area
  - Total: 8.89 sq mi (23.02 km^{2})
  - Land: 8.89 sq mi (23.02 km^{2})
  - Water: 0 sq mi (0.00 km^{2})
- Elevation: 23 ft (7 m)

Population (2020)
  - Total: 512
  - Density: 57.6/sq mi (22.24/km^{2})
- Time zone: UTC-9 (Alaska (AKST))
  - Summer (DST): UTC-8 (AKDT)
- ZIP code: 99789
- Area code: 907
- FIPS code: 02-56320
- GNIS feature ID: 1416680, 2419439
- Website: City of Nuiqsut

Nuiqsut (Inupiaq: Nuiqsat, IPA: [nuiχsɐt]) is a city in North Slope Borough, Alaska, United States. The population was 512 at the 2020 Census and 92.5% Alaska Native. It is located in the midst of a vast quantity of oil reserves and the closest community to ConocoPhillips oil drilling project named Willow Project in the Alpine, Alaska oil field of the National Petroleum Reserve–Alaska. It owns the surface rights, but not the subsurface rights of the Alpine field, which are with the regional Arctic Slope Regional Corporation.

== Geography ==
Nuiqsut is located at 70°12′59″N 151°0′21″W (70.216338, -151.005725).

Nuiqsut is in the North Slope Borough on the Nechelik Channel, about 35 miles (56 km) from the Beaufort Sea coast. It is located on the Colville River, about 5 miles north of its confluence with the Itkillik River.

According to the United States Census Bureau, the city has a total area of 9.2 square miles (24 km^{2}), all of it land. Air travel to the Nuiqsut Airport provides the only year-round access to Nuiqsut. Nuiqsut is accessible during the winter via an ice road. It is about 10 miles South of Alpine, Alaska and about 80 miles West of Prudhoe Bay, Alaska

== Demographics ==
Historical population
Census	Pop.	Note	%±
1980	208		—
1990	354		70.2%
2000	433		22.3%
2010	402		−7.2%
2020	512		27.4%
U.S. Decennial Census

Nuiqsut incorporated in 1975 and first appeared on the 1980 U.S. Census as an incorporated city.

=== 2020 census ===
As of the 2020 census, Nuiqsut had a population of 512. The median age was 24.7 years. 38.7% of residents were under the age of 18 and 5.7% of residents were 65 years of age or older. For every 100 females there were 101.6 males, and for every 100 females age 18 and over there were 96.2 males age 18 and over.

0.0% of residents lived in urban areas, while 100.0% lived in rural areas.

There were 130 households in Nuiqsut, of which 56.2% had children under the age of 18 living in them. Of all households, 29.2% were married-couple households, 26.2% were households with a male householder and no spouse or partner present, and 30.8% were households with a female householder and no spouse or partner present. About 21.6% of all households were made up of individuals and 5.3% had someone living alone who was 65 years of age or older.

There were 157 housing units, of which 17.2% were vacant. The homeowner vacancy rate was 0.0% and the rental vacancy rate was 3.9%.

The 2020 census reported no residents of Hispanic or Latino origin.

Racial composition as of the 2020 census
Race	Number	Percent
White	35	6.8%
Black or African American	1	0.2%
American Indian and Alaska Native	474	92.6%
Asian	0	0.0%
Native Hawaiian and Other Pacific Islander	0	0.0%
Some other race	0	0.0%
Two or more races	2	0.4%
Hispanic or Latino (of any race)	0	0.0%

=== 2010 census ===
As of the 2010 United States census, there were 402 people living in the city. The racial makeup of the city was 87.1% Native American, 10.0% White, 0.2% Black and 2.7% from two or more races.

=== 2000 census ===
As of the 2000 census there were 433 people, 110 households, and 90 families living in the city. The population density was 47.0 inhabitants per square mile (18.1/km^{2}).

There were 126 housing units at an average density of 13.7 per square mile (5.3/km^{2}). The racial makeup of the city was 88.22% Native American, 10.16% White, 0.23% Black or African American, 0.46% Asian, and 0.92% from two or more races. Hispanic or Latino people of any race were 0.23% of the population.

There were 110 households, out of which 54.5% had children under the age of 18 living with them, 42.7% were married couples living together, 22.7% had a female householder with no husband present, and 17.3% were non-families. 15.5% of all households were made up of individuals, and 0.9% had someone living alone who was 65 years of age or older. The average household size was 3.93 and the average family size was 4.24.

In the city, the population was spread out, with 42.0% under 18, 9.5% from 18 to 24, 30.5% from 25 to 44, 13.6% from 45 to 64, and 4.4% who were 65 or older. The median age was 24 years. For every 100 females, there were 147.4 males. For every 100 females age 18 and over, there were 130.3 males.

The median income for a household in the city was $48,036, and the median income for a family was $46,875. Males had a median income of $31,667 versus $25,625 for females. The per capita income for the city was $14,876. About 3.2% of families and 2.4% of the population were below the poverty line, including 1.1% of those under age 18 and none of those age 65 or over.

== Economy, commerce and social centers ==
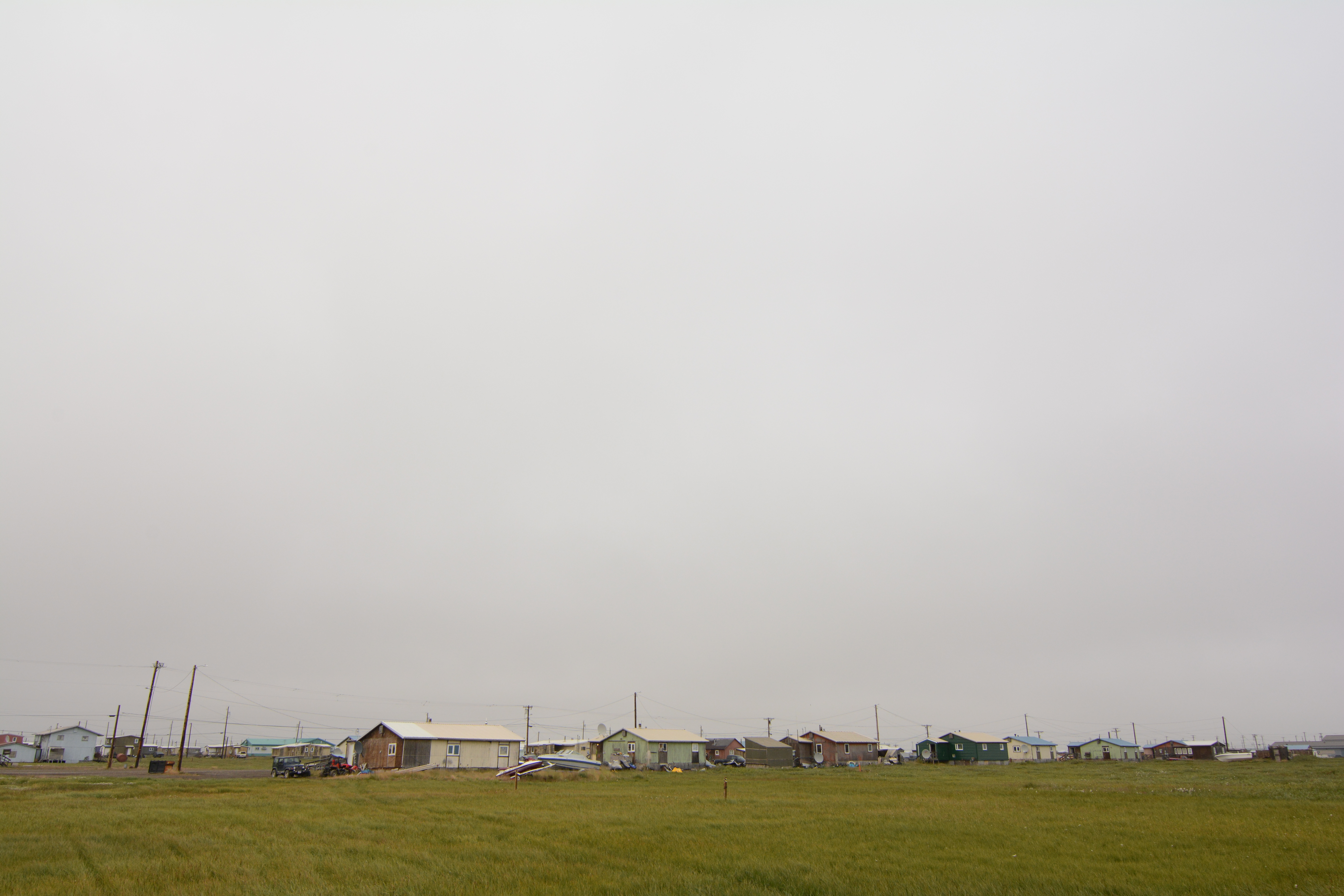
A row of homes in the center of Nuiqsut, Alaska

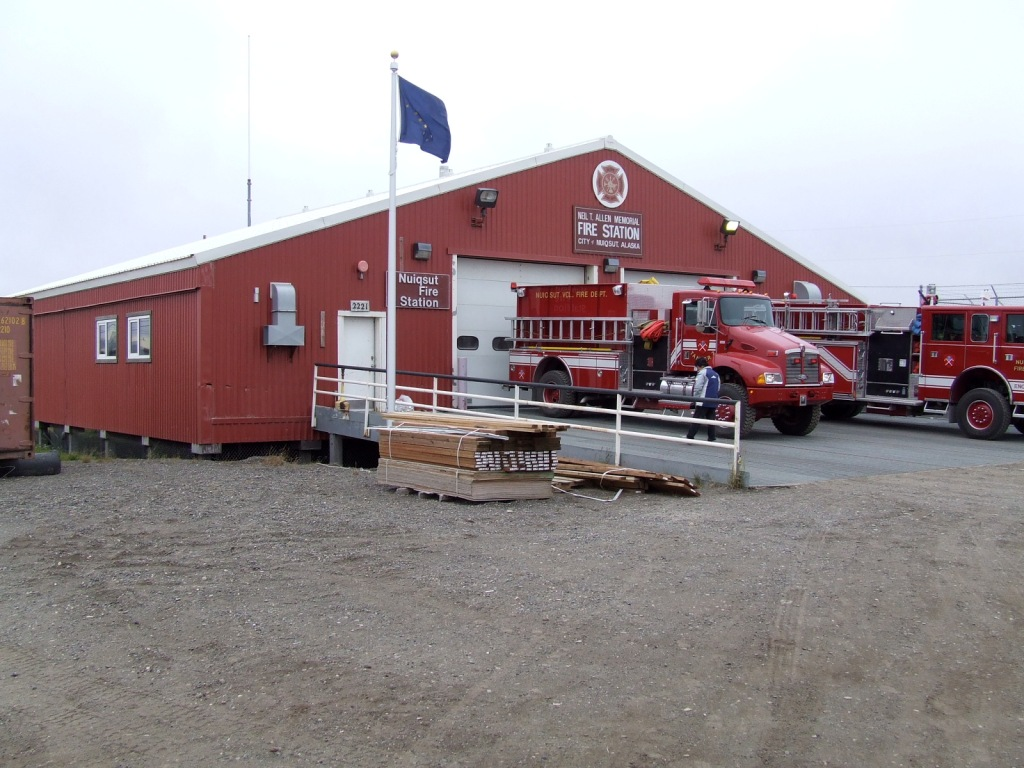
The Nuiqsut Fire Station

There is one commercial store in Nuiqsut, one mail receiving location (operated by the City of Nuiqsut not the United States Postal Service), and one church (Presbyterian). Other areas of social activity include the city recreation center and the school. An elder's living center is also present.

Since 1973, Nuiqsut has an Alaska Native corporation in form of a village corporation named "Kuukpik", in which more than 600 shareholders are enrolled.

Before 2001, Nuiqsut's economy was primarily subsistence-based. When ConocoPhillips found oil and gas at the Alpine, Alaska oil field to which and Kuukpik owns the surface rights, it negotiated a surface-use agreement. Since oil production began in 2001, Kuukpik has received a small royalty from ConocoPhillips. It was the first Native village impacted in this way. The subsurface rights of the Alpine field, however, are with the regional Arctic Slope Regional Corporation.

Since May 2018, ConocoPhillips has officially requested to develop the so-called Willow project oil field from the Bureau of Land Management. Kuukpik submitted comments to the draft Environmental Impact Statement reducing drill sites to four, shorter gravel roads and requesting protection of Teshekpuk Lake amongst other things. In March 2023, then Mayor Rosemary Ahtuangaruak opposed the project, because of impacts on caribou and subsistence lifestyle.

== Education ==
There is one school in Nuiqsut for grades kindergarten through 12th grade, Nuiqsut Trapper School of the North Slope Borough School District. The school also provides preschool. There are approximately 100 students. There are approximately 12 teachers and 6 other staff members. Many community functions are held in the school and it serves as social center as well as school. The school facilities also serve as an emergency shelter for the community in times of power outages.

== Health ==
The sale, importation, and possession of alcohol are banned in the village.

== Culture and history ==
The native people of the village are Iñupiat. In the early 1970s, the village was re-established, when the residents moved to the region from Utqiaġvik. For one year they lived in tents while housing was built. These original residents were the first to receive dividends from the oil companies in exchange for land use. The dividends are passed from the original shareholders on to the community member of their choice (often parent to child).

Native traditions such as hunting (whale, caribou, fox, ptarmigan, etc.) and the making of native clothes and crafts continues, although the influence of modern society has reduced both need and interest in these activities to some degree. The traditional whale hunted by the whalers of Nuiqsut is the bowhead whale.

In 2022, a gas leak forced some villagers to evacuate their homes.

In 2023, Nuiqsut officials criticized the Bureau of Land Management's (BLM) public input process for ConocoPhillips so called Willow project, as the BLM denied to extend the public comment period without explanation.

== Natural resources ==
Nuiqsut is located in the midst of a vast quantity of oil. Many major oil companies have oil facilities in the region (ConocoPhillips, Hilcorp, etc.). The relationship with the community of Nuiqsut is such that the oil company using the land, considered to be the property of the native Nuiqsut residents (Inupiat Eskimos), pay dividends to residents in exchange for use of the land. For many native residents, the dividends are the primary, or only, source of income, but the region's local development and global fossil fuel-generated climate disruption has had major negative impacts on their traditional hunting, fishing and whaling activities. Permafrost thawing, rising sea levels and warming of the Arctic Ocean present a cash-versus-culture conundrum to the inhabitants.

== Climate ==
Climate data for Nuiqsut Airport, Alaska, 1991–2020 normals, extremes 1998–present
Month	Jan	Feb	Mar	Apr	May	Jun	Jul	Aug	Sep	Oct	Nov	Dec	Year
Record high °F (°C)	36 (2)	38 (3)	34 (1)	44 (7)	67 (19)	82 (28)	84 (29)	88 (31)	67 (19)	50 (10)	38 (3)	36 (2)	88 (31)
Mean maximum °F (°C)	18.5 (−7.5)	22.9 (−5.1)	16.5 (−8.6)	30.3 (−0.9)	45.8 (7.7)	71.0 (21.7)	75.9 (24.4)	68.3 (20.2)	58.5 (14.7)	38.8 (3.8)	28.0 (−2.2)	24.0 (−4.4)	77.3 (25.2)
Mean daily maximum °F (°C)	−8.5 (−22.5)	−8.6 (−22.6)	−6.9 (−21.6)	9.9 (−12.3)	29.2 (−1.6)	49.9 (9.9)	57.9 (14.4)	51.1 (10.6)	39.8 (4.3)	24.0 (−4.4)	8.2 (−13.2)	−3.5 (−19.7)	20.2 (−6.6)
Daily mean °F (°C)	−15.7 (−26.5)	−15.7 (−26.5)	−14.2 (−25.7)	2.3 (−16.5)	24.1 (−4.4)	42.3 (5.7)	49.5 (9.7)	44.4 (6.9)	34.8 (1.6)	18.5 (−7.5)	1.2 (−17.1)	−10.2 (−23.4)	13.4 (−10.3)
Mean daily minimum °F (°C)	−23.0 (−30.6)	−22.8 (−30.4)	−21.4 (−29.7)	−5.3 (−20.7)	19.0 (−7.2)	34.7 (1.5)	41.2 (5.1)	37.7 (3.2)	29.7 (−1.3)	13.1 (−10.5)	−5.9 (−21.1)	−16.9 (−27.2)	6.7 (−14.1)
Mean minimum °F (°C)	−44.6 (−42.6)	−44.1 (−42.3)	−40.3 (−40.2)	−25.7 (−32.1)	0.3 (−17.6)	25.9 (−3.4)	32.9 (0.5)	30.5 (−0.8)	19.2 (−7.1)	−5.1 (−20.6)	−25.2 (−31.8)	−38.1 (−38.9)	−48.0 (−44.4)
Record low °F (°C)	−62 (−52)	−56 (−49)	−53 (−47)	−39 (−39)	−23 (−31)	21 (−6)	29 (−2)	25 (−4)	5 (−15)	−21 (−29)	−46 (−43)	−50 (−46)	−62 (−52)
Average precipitation inches (mm)	0.32 (8.1)	0.20 (5.1)	0.15 (3.8)	0.40 (10)	0.38 (9.7)	0.57 (14)	1.14 (29)	1.21 (31)	0.58 (15)	0.16 (4.1)	0.26 (6.6)	0.31 (7.9)	5.68 (144.3)
Average precipitation days (≥ 0.01 in)	0.0	0.9	1.0	1.2	4.1	4.6	8.5	11.4	8.9	2.2	0.8	0.3	43.9
Source 1: NOAA
Source 2: National Weather Service (mean maxima and minima, precip days 2006–2020)

== In popular culture ==
Nuiqsut was featured in season four episode one of the History television channel series Ice Road Truckers, when a convoy of truckers delivered supplies to the village.

== See also ==
- Native Village of Nuiqsut
