= Kuparuk River oil field =

Oil field in Alaska

Kuparuk River Oil Field
- Kuparuk River Unit's location in Alaska
- Country: United States
- Region: Alaska North Slope
- Offshore/onshore: onshore
- Coordinates: 70.3372°N 149.8504°W
- Operator: ConocoPhillips

Field history
- Discovery: April 1969, Sinclair's Ugnu 1 well
- Start of development: 1979
- Start of production: December 13, 1981
- Peak of production: 322,000 barrels per day (~1.60×10^{7} t/a)
- Peak year: 1992

Production
- Current production of oil: 71,021 barrels per day (~3.539×10^{6} t/a)
- Year of current production of oil: 2019
- Estimated oil in place: 6,000 million barrels (~8.2×10^{8} t)
- Producing formations: Kuparuk sandstone on the Colville structure

The Kuparuk River Oil Field, or Kuparuk, located in North Slope Borough, Alaska, United States, is the second largest oil field in North America by area. It started production in 1982, peaking in 1992. As of 2019, it produced approximately 71,021 barrels per day (~3.539×10^{6} t/a) of oil for ConocoPhillips and has been estimated to have 2 billion barrels (320×10^{6} m^{3}) of recoverable oil reserves. It is named for the Kuparuk River.

== Production history ==
In April 1969 Sinclair Oil discovered oil at the Ugnu Number 1 well, named for the nearby Ugnuravik River. Oil was found in the Kuparuk sandstone on the Colville structure.

In 1979 ARCO announced first production, and planned to start in 1982. Production actually began December 13, 1981, on five small gravel drilling pads. Oil recovery was expected to peak in 1986 at 250,000 barrels per day (40,000 m^{3}/d), but did not peak until 1992 at 322,000 barrels per day (51,200 m^{3}/d) from 371 wells.

In December 2002, the production averaged 166,155 barrels per day (26,416.5 m^{3}/d) from 448 wells, but by September 2016 the average declined to 78,755 barrels per day (12,521.0 m^{3}/d). For the first six months of 2017 production averaged 84,334 barrels per day (13,408.0 m^{3}/d) with a water cut of 87.4 percent. During the first half of 2019 the pool averaged 71,021 barrels per day (11,291.4 m^{3}/d) with a water cut of 88.7 percent.

== See also ==
- Prudhoe Bay Oil Field
- Trans-Alaskan Pipeline System
- Tarn Oil Field
- Willow project
