= Sarychev =

Sarychev or Sarichef may refer to

- Sarychev (surname)
- Sarychev Peak, a stratovolcano in the Kuril Islands, Russia
- Sarichef Island in the Chukchi Sea
- Cape Sarichef Airport on Unimak Island in the Aleutian Islands
- Cape Sarichef Light, a lighthouse on Unimak Island
