= Martin Sauer =

Martin Sauer may refer to:

- Martin Sauer (rowing) (born 1982), German Olympic rower
- Martin Sauer (explorer), English explorer for Russia
