= Sarychev (surname) =

Sarychev or Sarichef (Russian: Сарычев) is a Russian masculine surname, its feminine counterpart is Sarycheva. It may refer to

- Gavril Sarychev (1763–1831), Russian navigator and hydrographer
- Gennadi Sarychev (born 1938), Russian football player
- Kirill Sarychev (born 1989), Russian powerlifter
- Tatyana Sarycheva (born 1949), Russian volleyball player
- Valeri Sarychev (born 1960), Russian-Tajikistan-South Korean football goalkeeper
