= Cold Bay Air Force Station =

US Air Force General Surveillance Radar station in Alaska

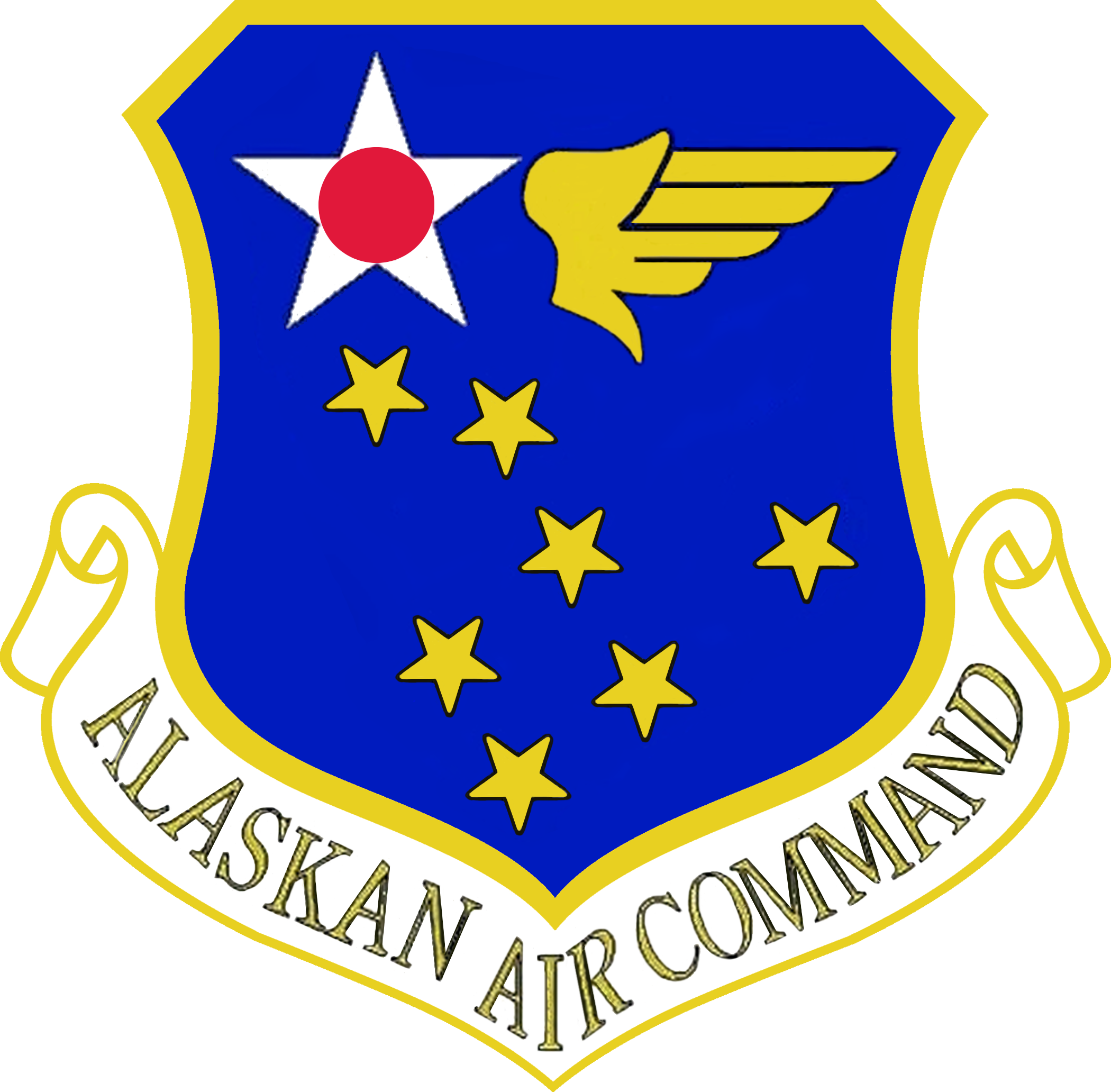
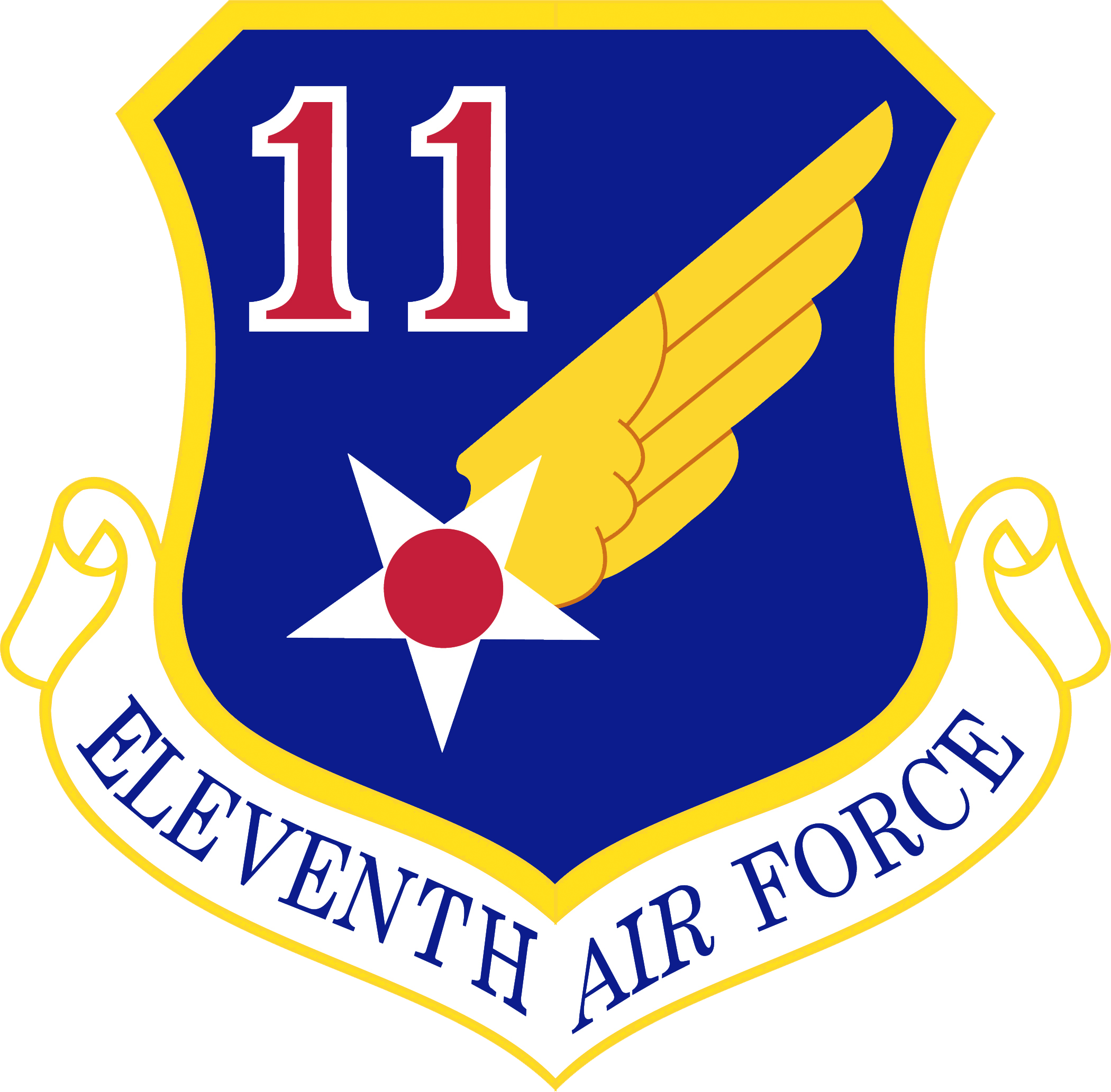
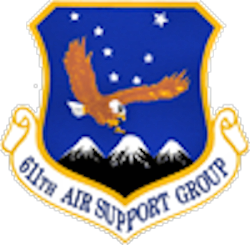
Cold Bay Air Force Station Cold Bay Long Range Radar Site
- Part of Eleventh Air Force (PACAF)
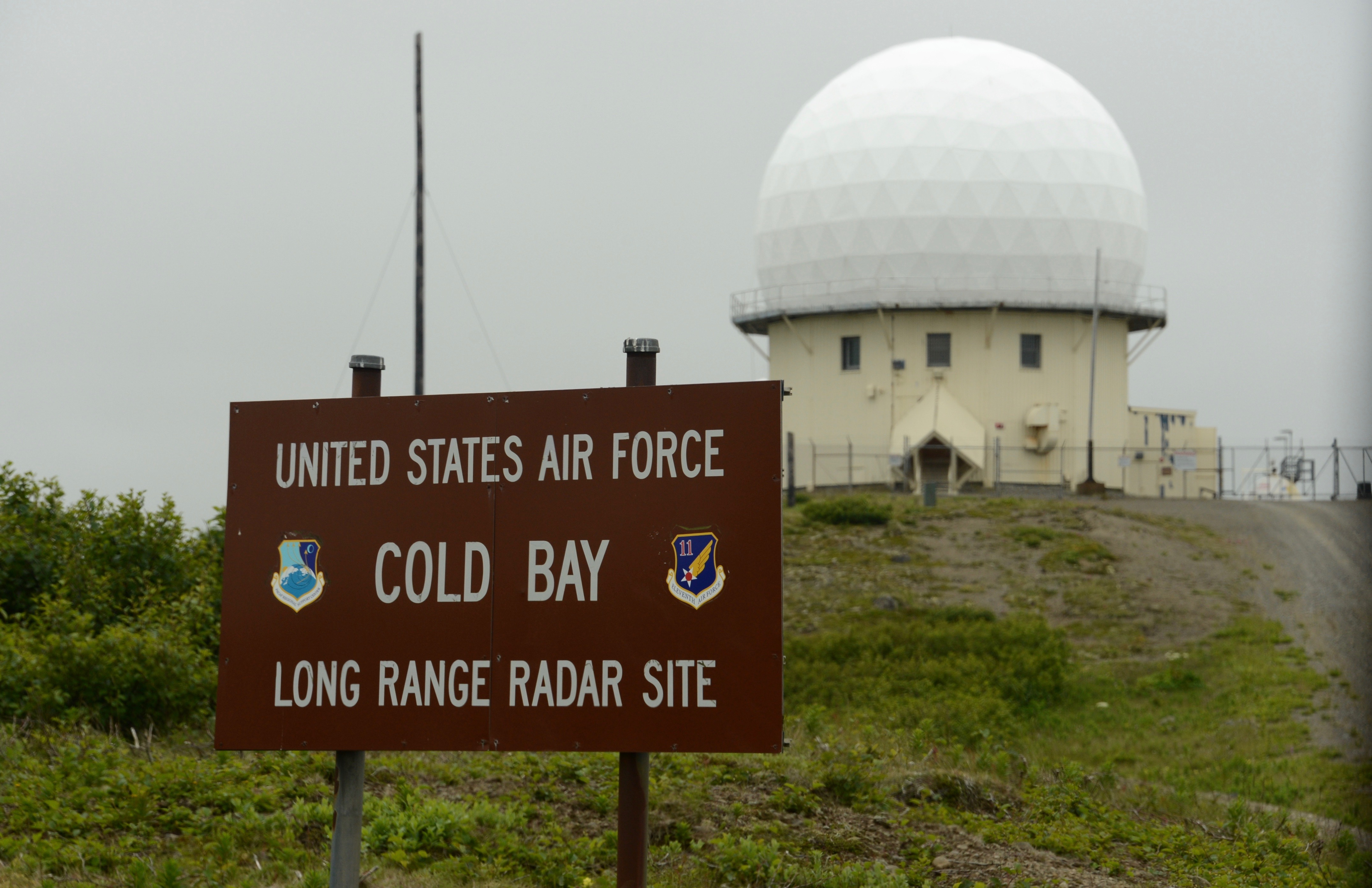

Site information
- Type: Air Force Station
- Controlled by: United States Air Force

Location
- Location of Cold Bay AFS, Alaska
- Coordinates: 55°14′42″N 162°46′12″W

Site history
- Built: 1958
- In use: 1959-Present

Garrison information
- Garrison: 714th Aircraft Control and Warning Squadron (1954-1983)

Cold Bay Air Force Station (AAC ID: F-26, LRR ID: A-08, DEW ID: COB-MAIN) is a closed United States Air Force General Surveillance Radar station. It is located 625 miles (1,006 km) southwest of Anchorage, Alaska.

The ground control intercept (GCI) station F-26 was closed on 1 November 1983. A new minimally attended Long Range Radar (LRR) site, A-08 was built about 5 miles to the southeast of the closed Air Force Station as part of the Alaska Radar System. Today, it remains active as part of the Alaska NORAD Region under the jurisdiction of the 611th Air Support Group, Elmendorf AFB, Alaska.

== History ==
Cold Bay AFS was a continental defense radar station constructed to provide the United States Air Force early warning of an attack by the Soviet Union on Alaska.

Planning for a surveillance station at Cold Bay began in July 1956 and construction commenced later that year. Not part of the first 25 Aircraft Control and Warning (AC&W) radar stations, Cold Bay AFS was added as part of the Aleutian extension of the Distant Early Warning Line (DEW Line). The radar station and support base was located at the southwest end of the Aleutian Peninsula, about 7 miles west-northwest of the former Fort Randall Army Air Base (later Thornbrough Air Force Base). The airport facilities were used as a logistics support terminal during the construction of the site, which was completed in September 1958.

The station consisted of a power/heating plant, water and fuel storage tanks, gymnasium and other support office buildings. Two other buildings contained living quarters, work areas, and recreational facilities plus opportunities for such sports as skiing, skating, horseshoes, and basketball. The station buildings were, except for the civil engineering building connected by heated hallways. As a result, personnel stationed there, with only very few exceptions, were able to wear "summer" uniforms year round, unless they had a need to go outside during the winter season. The coverings of the station's three radar towers were heated from within to keep the covering from becoming brittle from extreme cold, and thus subject to being damaged or destroyed by high winds. Tours at the station were limited to one year because of the psychological strain and physical hardships.

The 714th Aircraft Control and Warning Squadron (AC&W Sq) operated AN/FPS-3, AN/FPS-20A, and AN/FPS-6(-90) radars. Cold Bay AFS operated as a long-range surveillance radar station which provided information 24/7 to the air defense Direction Center at Fire Island AFS where it was analyzed to determine range, direction altitude speed and whether or not aircraft were friendly or hostile. An AN/FYQ-9 Semiautomatic Data Processing and Display System was installed and became operational in July 1965, eliminating the need to pass track data manually.

Communications were initially provided by a high frequency radio system which proved unreliable because of atmospheric disturbances. The Alaskan Air Command, after investigating various options, decided to build the White Alice Communications System, a system of Air Force-owned tropospheric scatter and microwave radio relay sites operated by the Air Force Communications Service (AFCS). The Cold Bay site, located next to the radars, was activated in 1958. It was inactivated in 1979, and replaced by an Alascom owned and operated satellite earth terminal as part of an Air Force plan to divest itself of the obsolete White Alice Communications System and transfer the responsibility to a commercial firm.

Over the years, the equipment at the station was upgraded or modified to improve the efficiency and accuracy of the information gathered by the radars. In 1982, a new AN/FPS-117 minimally attended radar under Alaskan Air Command's SEEK IGLOO program was constructed about 2 miles southeast of the station 55°14′43″N 162°46′10″W. It was designed to transmit aircraft tracking data via satellite to the Alaskan NORAD Regional Operations Control Center (ROCC) at Elmendorf AFB.

No longer needed, the 714th AC&W Sq was inactivated on 1 November 1983. In 1990, jurisdiction of the Cold Bay LRR Site was transferred to Pacific Air Force (PACAF)'s Eleventh Air Force with the redesignation of Alaskan Air Command (AAC).

In 1998 PACAF initiated "Operation Clean Sweep", in which abandoned Cold War stations in Alaska were remediated and the land restored to its previous state. After years of neglect the facilities at the station had lost any value they had when the site was closed. The site remediation was carried out by the 611th Civil Engineering Squadron at Elmendorf AFB, and remediation work was completed by 2005.

== Current status ==
Today very little of the former Cold Bay Air Force Station remains. The site is controlled by the PACAF 611th Air Support Group, based at Elmendorf AFB. It is generally unattended; a few civilian contractors access the Cold Bay LRR Site via the Cold Bay Airport for maintaining the facilities.

== Air Force units and assignments ==
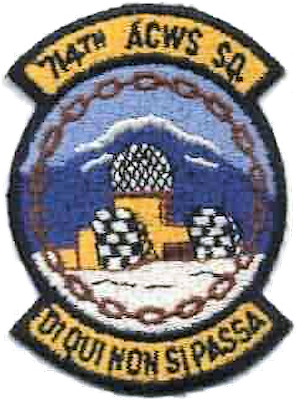
Emblem of the 714th Aircraft Control and Warning Squadron

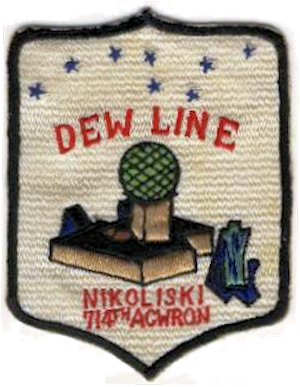
DEW Line emblem of Detachment 1, 714th Aircraft Control and Warning Squadron

=== Units ===
- 714th Aircraft Control and Warning Squadron

Activated 1 January 1959
Inactivated 1 November 1983

Assignments:

- 5040th Aircraft Control and Warning Group, 1 January 1959
- 10th Air Division, 1 November 1959
- 5070th Air Defense Wing, 1 August 1960
- Alaskan Air Command, 1 November 1961
- 531st Aircraft Control and Warning Group (later 11th Tactical Control Group), 15 July 1977 - 1 November 1983

=== Detached DEW Line sites ===
The 714th was a unique AC&W squadron, with its support for DEW Line stations in the Aleutians between 1959 and 1969. It was the only one that covered such a large area. It had five manned detachments at remote sites, each located about 130 miles apart stretching from just west of King Salmon all the way to Nikolski Island, about halfway to Shemya. In effect, they were responsible for radar coverage for all of the Aleutian Peninsula as well as the major Aleutian Islands. No other squadron had such a mission. Each site had an AN/FPS-19 search radar and troposcatter radio relay.

Staffing at the detachments included 3 cooks, one water treatment tech, one electrician, an admin/crypto specialist, one vehicle maintenance tech, the commander, three radio techs, a supply tech, a first Sgt, three radar techs, three power production techs and the remainder scope operators. These detachments were located at:

- Detachment 1, Nikolski Radars, COB-1 52°57′36″N 168°50′58″W

Nikolski Air Force Station 52°57′36″N 168°52′02″W

- Detachment 2, Driftwood Bay Radars, COB-2 53°58′28″N 166°54′18″W

Driftwood Bay Air Force Station 53°58′07″N 166°51′17″W

- Detachment 3, Cape Sarichef Radars, COB-3 54°35′32″N 164°52′34″W

Cape Sarichef Air Force Station 54°35′03″N 164°54′18″W

- Detachment 4, Port Moller Radars, COB-4 55°58′41″N 160°30′01″W

Port Moller Air Force Station 56°00′21″N 160°33′38″W

- Detachment 5, Port Heiden Radars, COB-5 56°58′38″N 158°39′09″W

Port Heiden Air Force Station (Former World War II Fort Morrow AAF) 56°57′23″N 158°38′20″W

Each detachment was manned by 24 enlisted, one officer and in some instances a civilian technical representative. The manning of the squadron and the detachments was part of a "minimum manning" experiment. If you were assigned to a detachment you stayed there 365 without leave. Only way to leave early was due to severe sickness or a major emergency at home such as death of immediate family member.

These five Aleutian DEW Line sites were deactivated 30 September 1969. The main site at Cold Bay AFS was converted to a NORAD surveillance site.
