= Matua (island) =

Uninhabited island in the Kuril Island chain

Native name: Матуа (Russian); 松輪島 (Japanese)
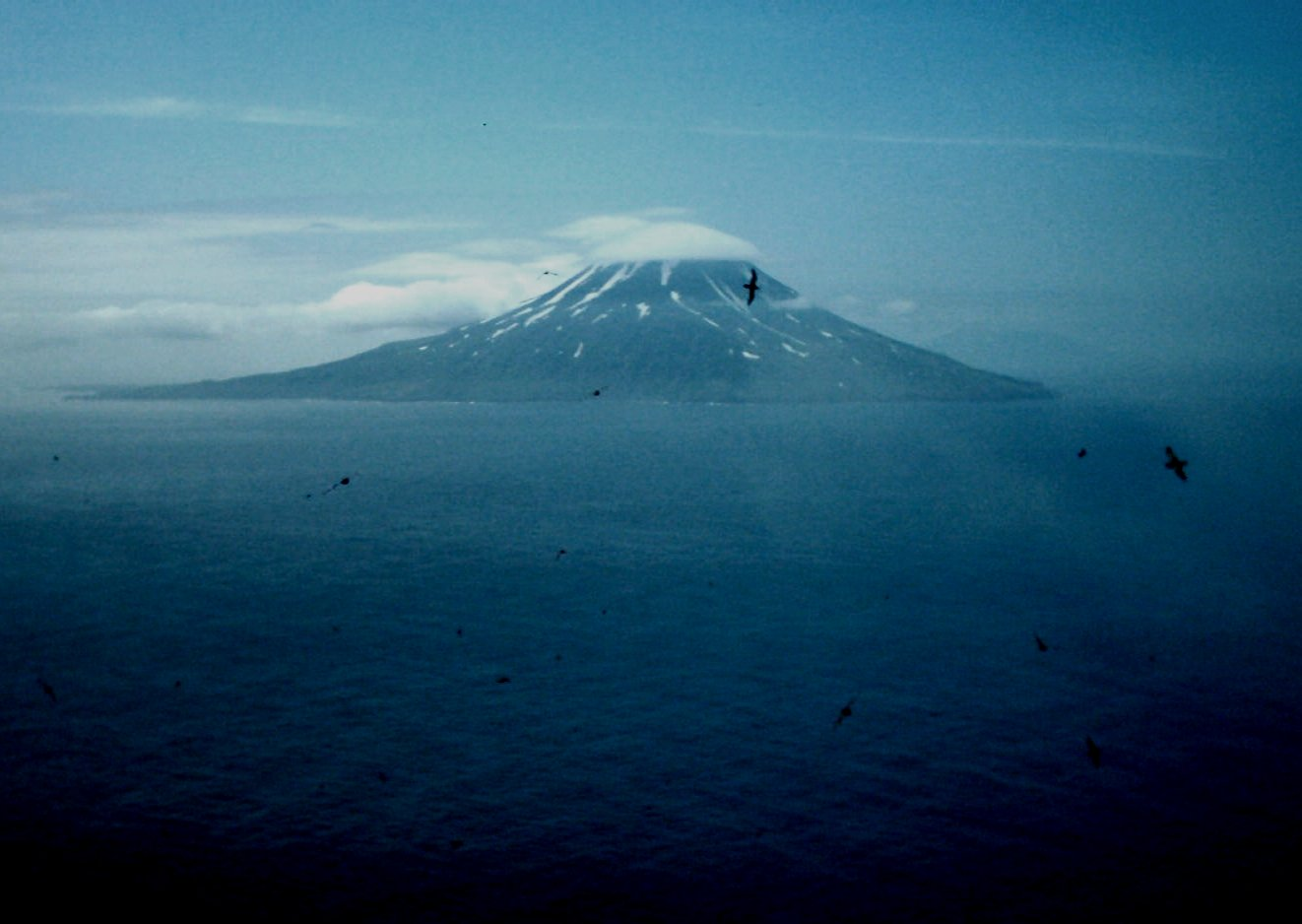

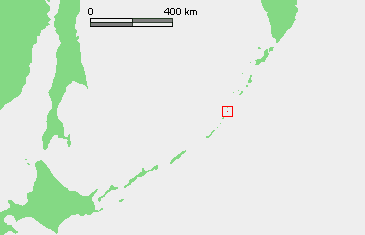

Geography
- Location: Sea of Okhotsk
- Coordinates: 48.09°N 153.20°E
- Archipelago: Kuril Islands
- Area: 52 km^{2} (20 sq mi)
- Highest elevation: 1,496 m (4908 ft)
- Highest point: Pik Sarychev

Administration
- Russia

Demographics
- Population: 0

Matua (Russian: Матуа; Japanese: 松輪島, romanized: Matsuwa-tō) is an uninhabited volcanic island near the center of the Kuril Islands chain in the Sea of Okhotsk in the northwest Pacific Ocean, 16 km (9.9 mi) across Golovnin Strait from Raikoke. Its name is derived from the Ainu language, from “hellmouth”.

== History ==
Hunting and fishing parties of the Ainu have long visited Matua, but the island had no permanent habitation at the time of European contact. It appears on an official map showing the territories of the Matsumae Domain, a feudal domain of Edo period Japan dated 1644, and the Tokugawa shogunate officially confirmed these holdings in 1715. Some early European documents refer to the island as Raukoke.

The Empire of Russia claimed sovereignty over the island, which initially passed to Russia under the terms of the Treaty of Shimoda (1855), but reverted to the Empire of Japan per the Treaty of Saint Petersburg along with the rest of the Kuril islands. Japan formerly administered Matua as part of Shimushiru District of Nemuro Subprefecture of Hokkaidō.

During World War II the Imperial Japanese Army had a roughly east–west-oriented airfield, which hosted the IJNAS's 553rd Kōkūtai, equipped with Aichi D3A Val dive bombers, located on this island, with the active runway potentially of some 1.33 km (4,360 ft) length, located on its southernmost areas. This airfield was of an advanced design, having three separate airstrips including a tertiary airstrip connected to the other two at a 120° angle. This allowed simultaneous takeoff and recovery of air units, as well as improved takeoff potential in adverse wind conditions. In addition, at least two of the primary airstrips were designed with hot water channels embedded within. In icy or snowy weather, hot water generated by the island's geothermal activity would be pumped through these channels, keeping these airstrips free of ice year-round.

The island was garrisoned by 7000-8000 men of the 41st Independent Mixed Regiment, 6th Independent Tank Company, and supporting units. During 1944 the US Army Air Forces intermittently bombed the Japanese facilities on the island and ships of the United States Navy shelled it. The Americans sank several Japanese cargo vessels near the island or while at harbor. On June 1, 1944, a Japanese shore-battery on Point Tagan sank the American submarine USS Herring. During the Soviet Battle of the Kuril Islands in the last weeks of World War II, the Japanese garrison surrendered to the Red Army without resistance (August 1945).

After World War II the island came under the control of the Soviet Union, and Soviet Border Troops manned the former Japanese military facilities. Its most important role was radar surveillance of the Kuril Islands. A VHF P-14 radar, "Tall King", was put into service during the 1950s or 1960s, and a P-35 radar and possibly a PRV-10 “Rock Cake” radar were also in service at some point.

With the withdrawal of Soviet military forces following the dissolution of the Soviet Union in 1991, the island became uninhabited. The Russian Federation administers it as part of the Sakhalin Oblast. In 2016 some two hundred Russian officials and technical experts made an expedition to the island, part of a plan to rehabilitate the derelict 1.2 km Soviet airfield and establish a new naval and logistical forward military base. A new 1400 meter runway was built between 2016 and 2019, along with new hard stands, both of which are visible on Google Earth and other satellite images. The island now hosts a battery of Bastion anti-ship cruise missiles.

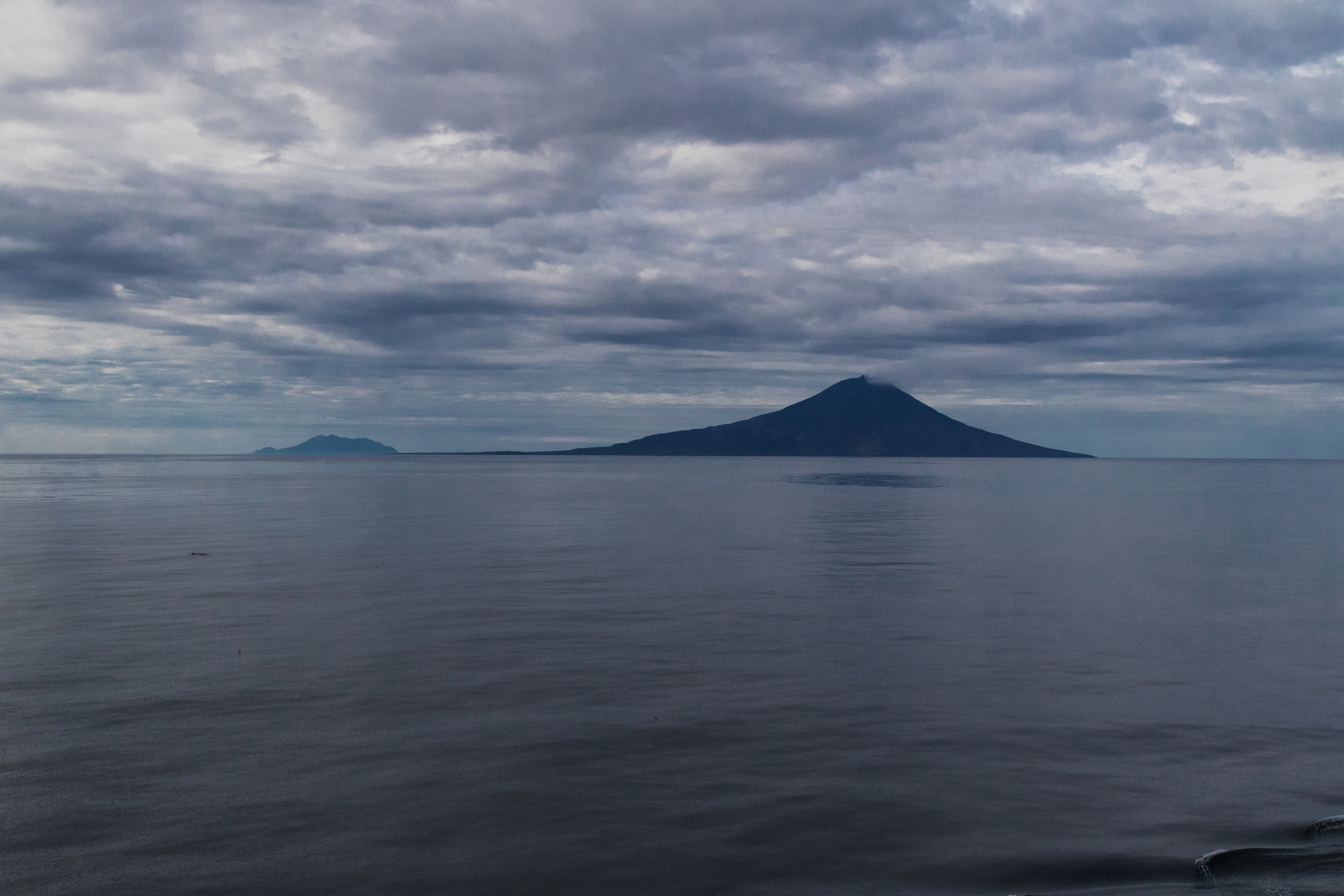
Matua and Rasshua Islands as seen entering the Golovnin Strait. Matua is in the foreground and Rasshua in the background.

== Geology ==
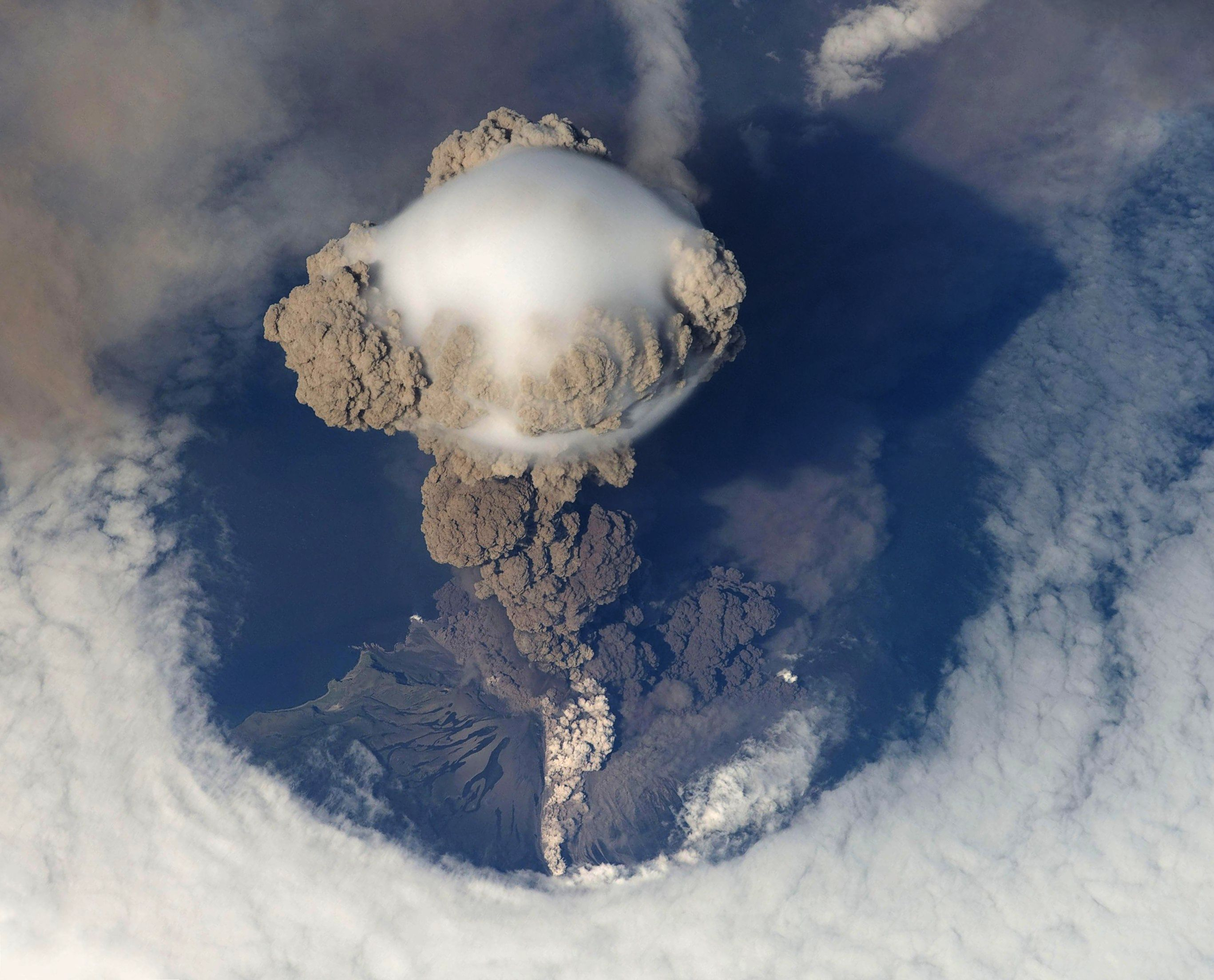
Eruption of Sarychev volcano in 2009, as seen from the International Space Station

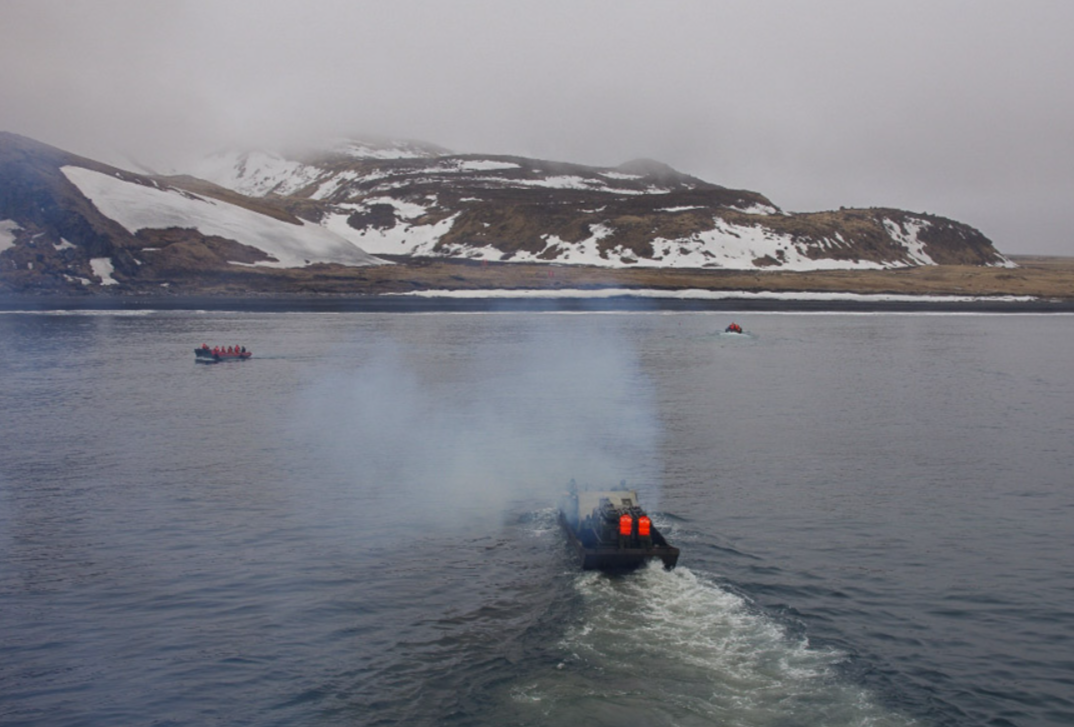
Expedition of the Ministry of Defense of Russia and the Russian Geographical Society to the island of Matua. 2016 year

Matua is roughly oval, with a length of 11 km (6.8 mi) with a width of 6.5 km (4.0 mi), and an area of 52 km^{2} (20 sq mi). The island is a complex stratovolcano with two main peaks.

Sarychev Peak (Russian: влк.Сарычева, Japanese: 芙蓉山; Fuyōzan, also known as Matsuwa-Fuji) in the northwest of the island is one of the most active volcanoes of the Kuril Islands. The central cone has a 250-meter (820 ft) wide, very steep-walled crater with a jagged rim, rising to a height of 1,496 m (4,908 ft). Lava flows descending on all sides of the peak forms capes along the coast. Eruptions have been recorded since the 1760s, including 1878–1879, 1923, 1930, 1946, 1960, 1976, 1981, 1987, 1989 and 2009, with the largest in 1946 which produced pyroclastic flows that reached the sea. The 2009 eruption was large enough to affect air traffic between Asia and North America.

The much smaller peak to the south, Japanese: 天蓋山; Tengaizan has a height of 127 m (417 ft).

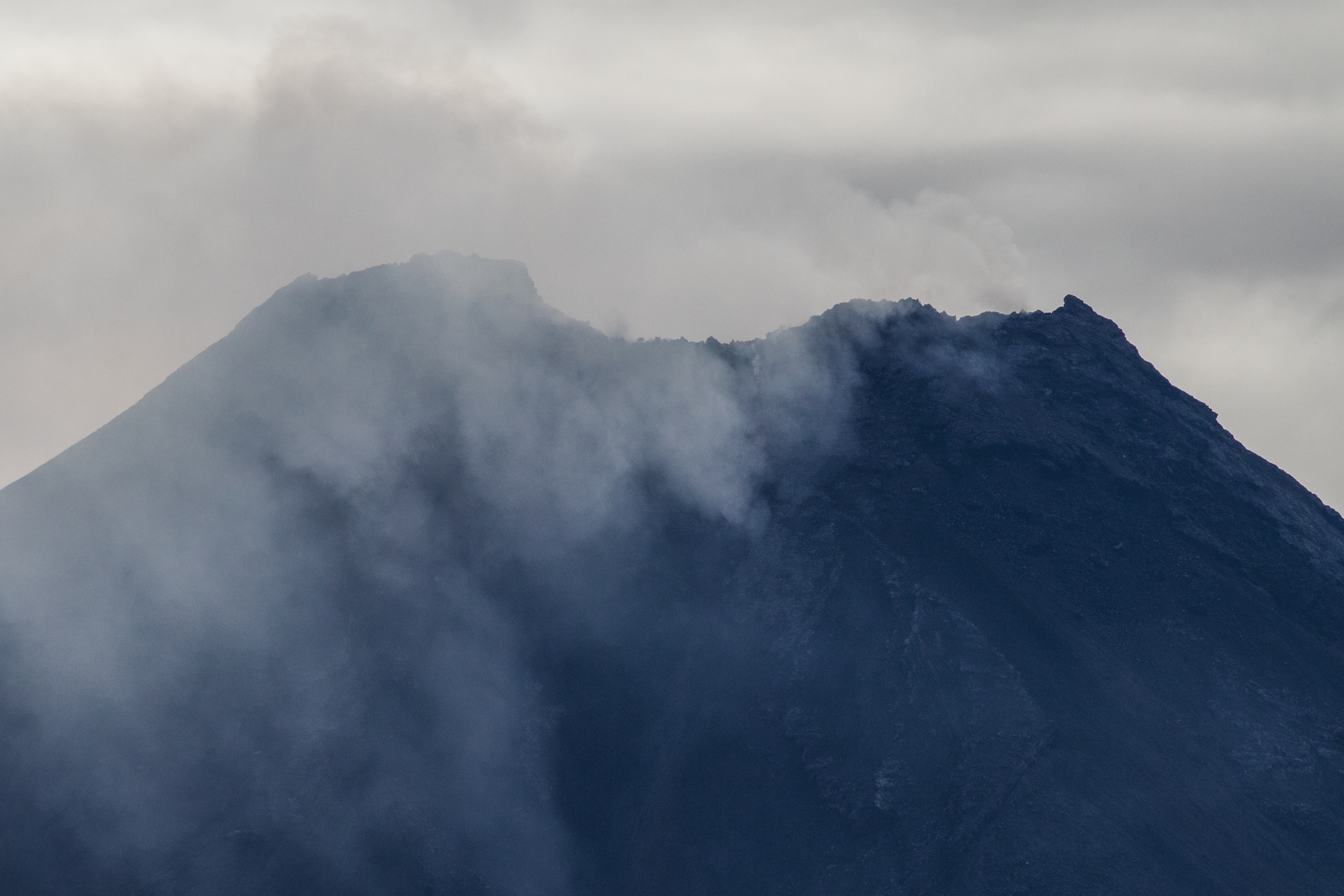
Matua Island Sarychev Peak venting as seen from the Golovnin Strait

== Climate ==
Although it is located at the same latitude as Paris or Seattle, the Oyashio current on the western flank of the Aleutian Low gives Matua a subarctic climate (Köppen Dfc) that is close to a polar climate (ET). Unlike the quintessential subarctic climate of Siberia or Mongolia, however, Matua has very heavy precipitation as rain, snow and fog. It also has much milder winters than corresponding latitudes in Manchuria: the mean temperature of the coldest month in Matua is −6.1 °C (21.0 °F) as against −17.8 °C (0.0 °F) in Qiqihar in Heilongjiang. Seasonal lag, like in all the Kuril Islands, is a major feature of the climate, with August being the mildest month and February the coldest. The island experiences very strong winds in the winter months as a result of its exposed location in the middle Kuril islands, subject to the influence of the Aleutian Low.

Climate data for Matua Island (1947-1996)
Month	Jan	Feb	Mar	Apr	May	Jun	Jul	Aug	Sep	Oct	Nov	Dec	Year
Record high °C (°F)	10.4 (50.7)	8.9 (48.0)	10.0 (50.0)	13.8 (56.8)	23.1 (73.6)	26.5 (79.7)	29.0 (84.2)	27.6 (81.7)	26.1 (79.0)	23.9 (75.0)	12.5 (54.5)	11.0 (51.8)	29.0 (84.2)
Mean maximum °C (°F)	2.5 (36.5)	2.5 (36.5)	3.7 (38.7)	8.4 (47.1)	15.6 (60.1)	17.7 (63.9)	21.9 (71.4)	22.4 (72.3)	20.0 (68.0)	13.6 (56.5)	8.3 (46.9)	5.3 (41.5)	24.1 (75.4)
Mean daily maximum °C (°F)	−2.4 (27.7)	−2.4 (27.7)	−1.1 (30.0)	2.0 (35.6)	6.0 (42.8)	9.0 (48.2)	12.4 (54.3)	14.9 (58.8)	12.7 (54.9)	8.8 (47.8)	3.4 (38.1)	−0.1 (31.8)	5.3 (41.5)
Daily mean °C (°F)	−4.3 (24.3)	−4.6 (23.7)	−3.4 (25.9)	0.1 (32.2)	3.3 (37.9)	5.7 (42.3)	9.0 (48.2)	11.1 (52.0)	9.3 (48.7)	5.9 (42.6)	1.1 (34.0)	−2.3 (27.9)	2.6 (36.6)
Mean daily minimum °C (°F)	−6.8 (19.8)	−6.9 (19.6)	−5.5 (22.1)	−2.0 (28.4)	0.2 (32.4)	2.2 (36.0)	5.4 (41.7)	7.4 (45.3)	6.1 (43.0)	3.1 (37.6)	−1.3 (29.7)	−4.7 (23.5)	−0.2 (31.6)
Mean minimum °C (°F)	−12.8 (9.0)	−13.6 (7.5)	−12.2 (10.0)	−6.5 (20.3)	−3.2 (26.2)	−0.8 (30.6)	1.3 (34.3)	3.1 (37.6)	1.5 (34.7)	−0.8 (30.6)	−6.0 (21.2)	−10.3 (13.5)	−15.1 (4.8)
Record low °C (°F)	−20 (−4)	−18.9 (−2.0)	−18.9 (−2.0)	−10 (14)	−5.1 (22.8)	−4 (25)	−3 (27)	−0.1 (31.8)	0 (32)	−6.1 (21.0)	−11.1 (12.0)	−17.8 (0.0)	−20 (−4)
Average precipitation mm (inches)	106.2 (4.18)	81.5 (3.21)	84.8 (3.34)	77.0 (3.03)	98.8 (3.89)	76.0 (2.99)	74.1 (2.92)	108.7 (4.28)	139.8 (5.50)	150.2 (5.91)	153.1 (6.03)	122.8 (4.83)	1,273 (50.11)
Average precipitation days (≥ 1 mm)	22.2	19.6	16.7	12.6	11.2	8.2	7.6	9.8	12.0	16.4	21.6	22.9	180.8
Source 1: Météo climat stats
Source 2: Météo Climat

== See also ==
- List of volcanoes in Russia
- Organization of Kita and Minami Fortresses
