= Sarychev Peak =

Active volcano in the Kuril Islands, Russia

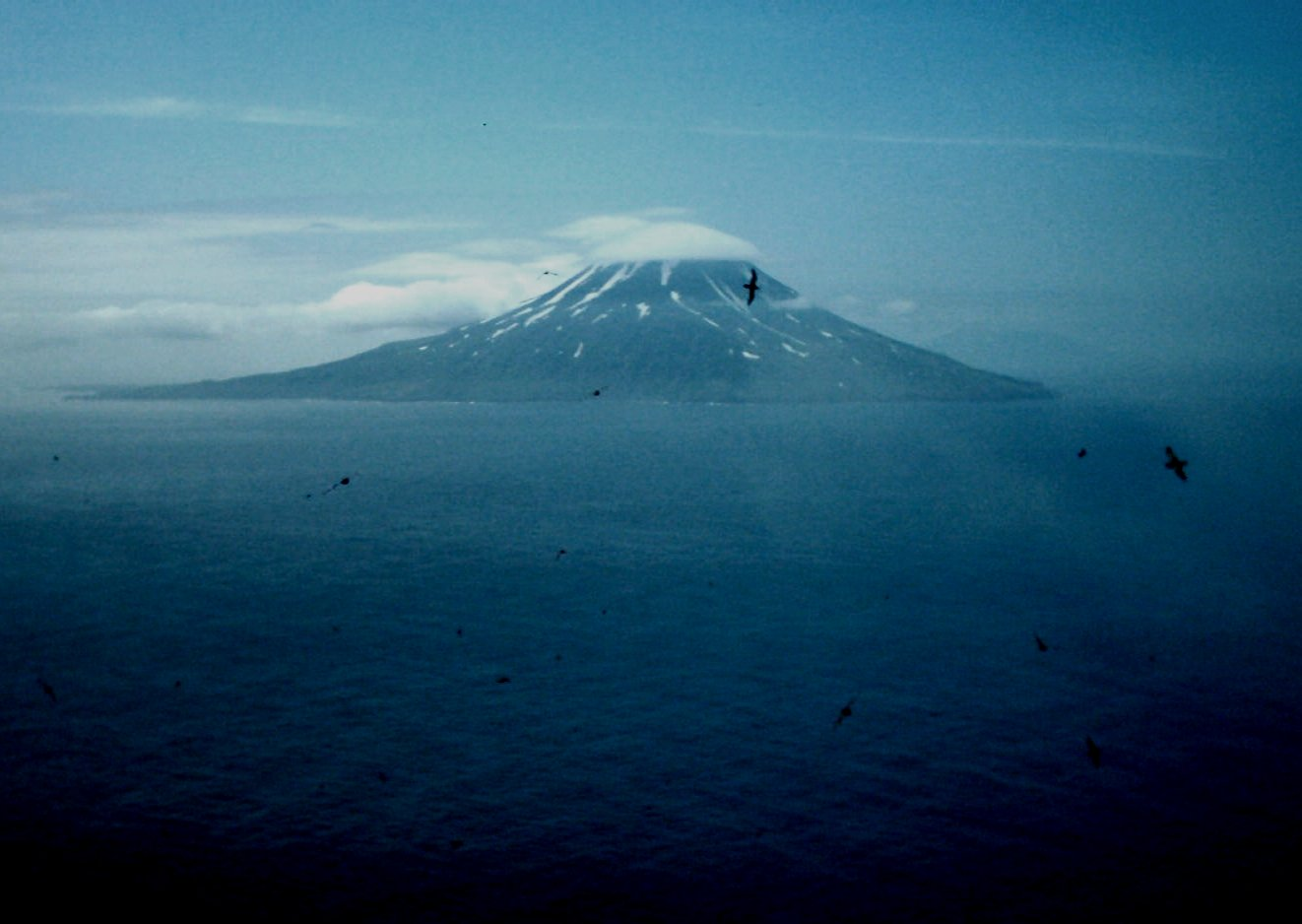
- Sarychev Peak on Matua Island, looking south from Raikoke.

Highest point
- Elevation: 1,496 m (4,908 ft)
- Prominence: 1,496 m (4,908 ft)
- Coordinates: 48.092°N 153.20°E

Geography
- Location within Far Eastern Federal District
- Location: Matua, Kuril Islands, Russia

Geology
- Mountain type: Stratovolcano
- Last eruption: 2021

Sarychev Peak (Russian: вулкан Пик Сарычева, Vulkan Sarycheva, variants: Japanese: 芙蓉山 Fuyō Mountain, Fuyō-san, Fuyō-yama, Fuyo-zan, Huyō San, Japanese: 松輪富士 Matsuwa-fuji) is an active stratovolcano covering almost the entirety of Matua Island in the Kuril Islands, Russia. It is a young, highly symmetrical stratovolcanic cone. The height of the plume during the 2009 eruption was estimated at 12 to 18 kilometres (7.5 to 11.2 mi).

== History ==
The peak was named after admiral Gavril Sarychev of the Imperial Russian Navy.

=== 2009 eruption ===
The volcano erupted June 11–21, 2009, sending out ash plumes. As the volcano is near some of the main air routes between East Asia and North America, there was some disruption to air traffic.

Eruption video as seen from the International Space Station, June 12, 2009

During an early stage of the eruption, on June 12, 2009, the International Space Station passed overhead and astronauts photographed the event. A hole in the overhead clouds, possibly caused by the shock wave from the explosion, allowed a clear view of the plume and pyroclastic flow down the sides of the mountain. A cap-like pileus cloud is visible atop the rising column.

Sarychev Peak previously erupted in 1760, 1805, 1879, 1923, 1927, 1928, 1930, 1932, 1946, 1954, 1960, 1965, 1976, 1986 and 1989.

== Gallery ==
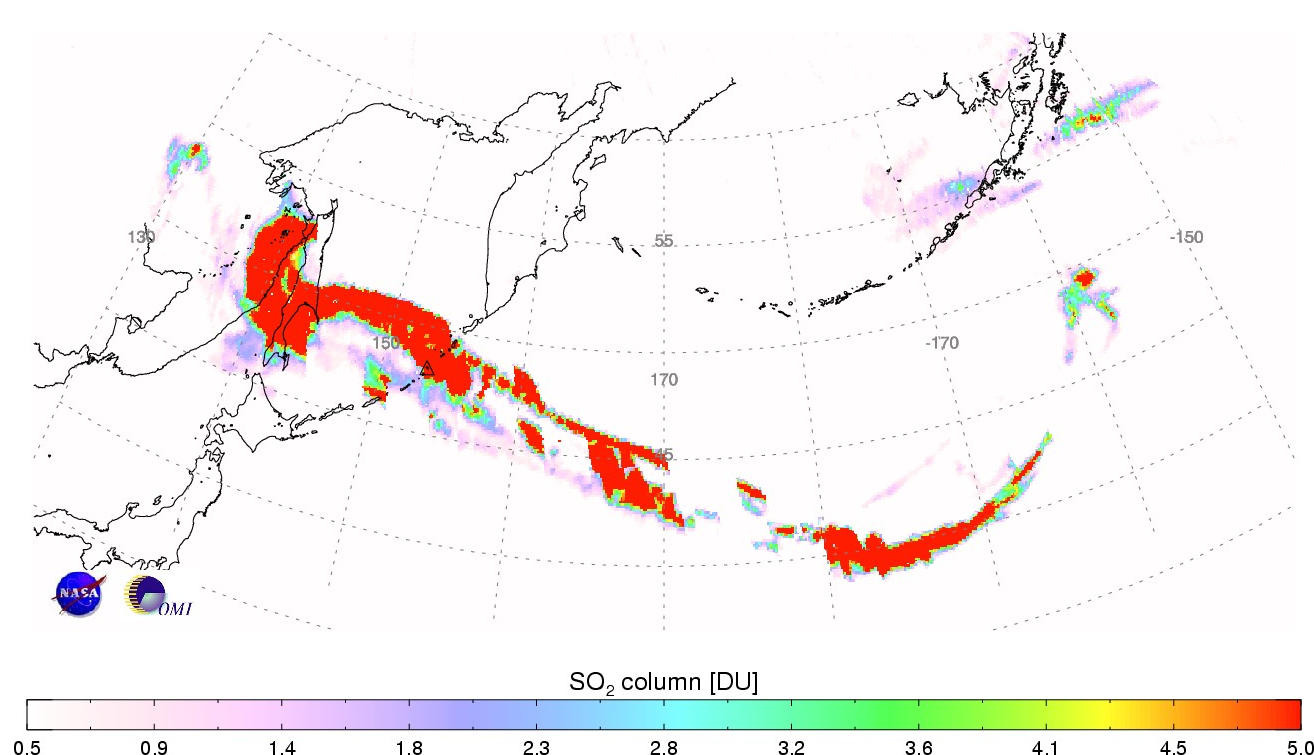
The sulphur dioxide cloud generated by the eruption on 12 June 2009 (in Dobson units).

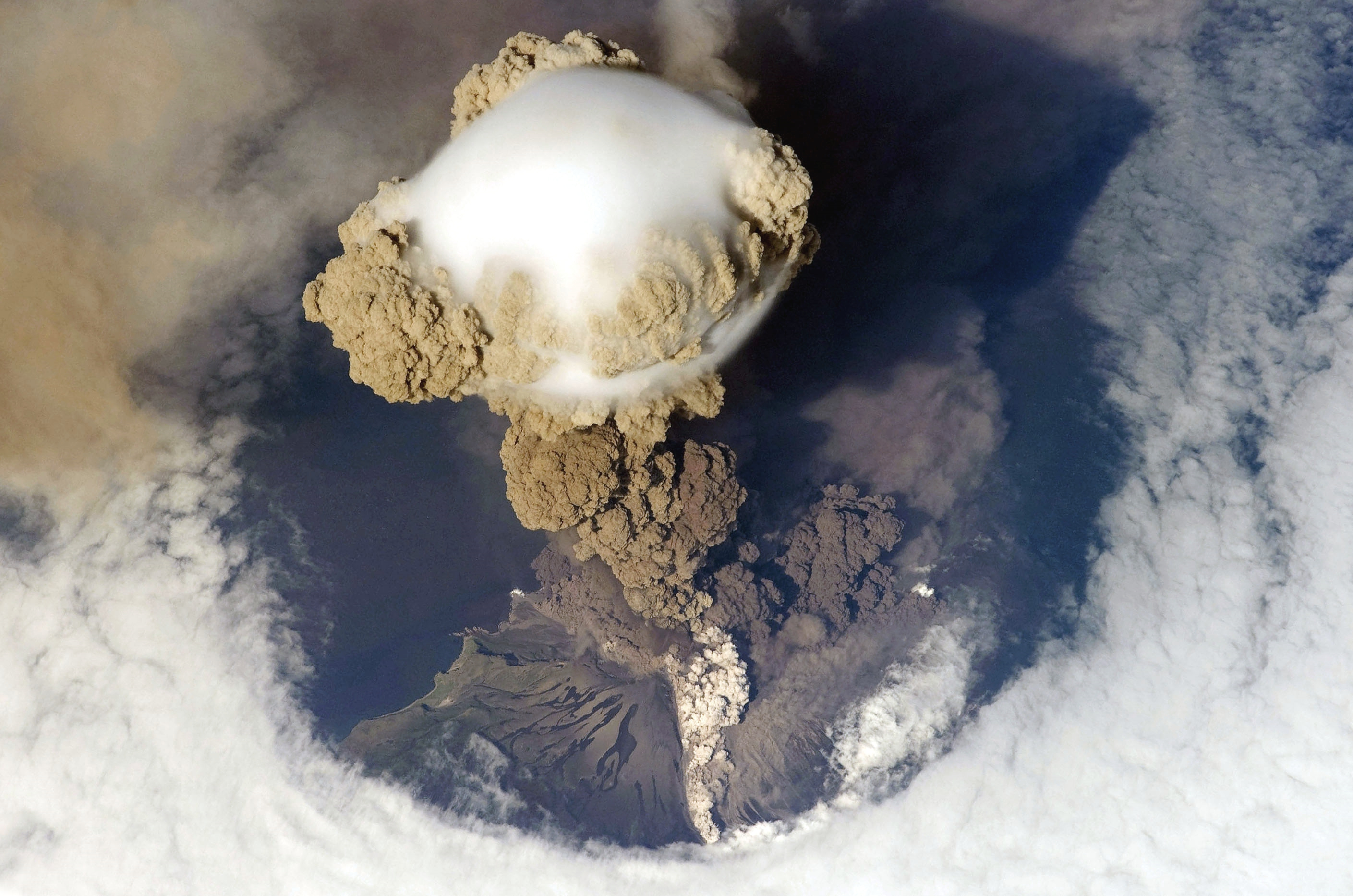
A still image of the 2009 eruption on June 12.

== See also ==
- List of volcanoes in Russia
