= Harriman Glacier =

Glacier in the United States

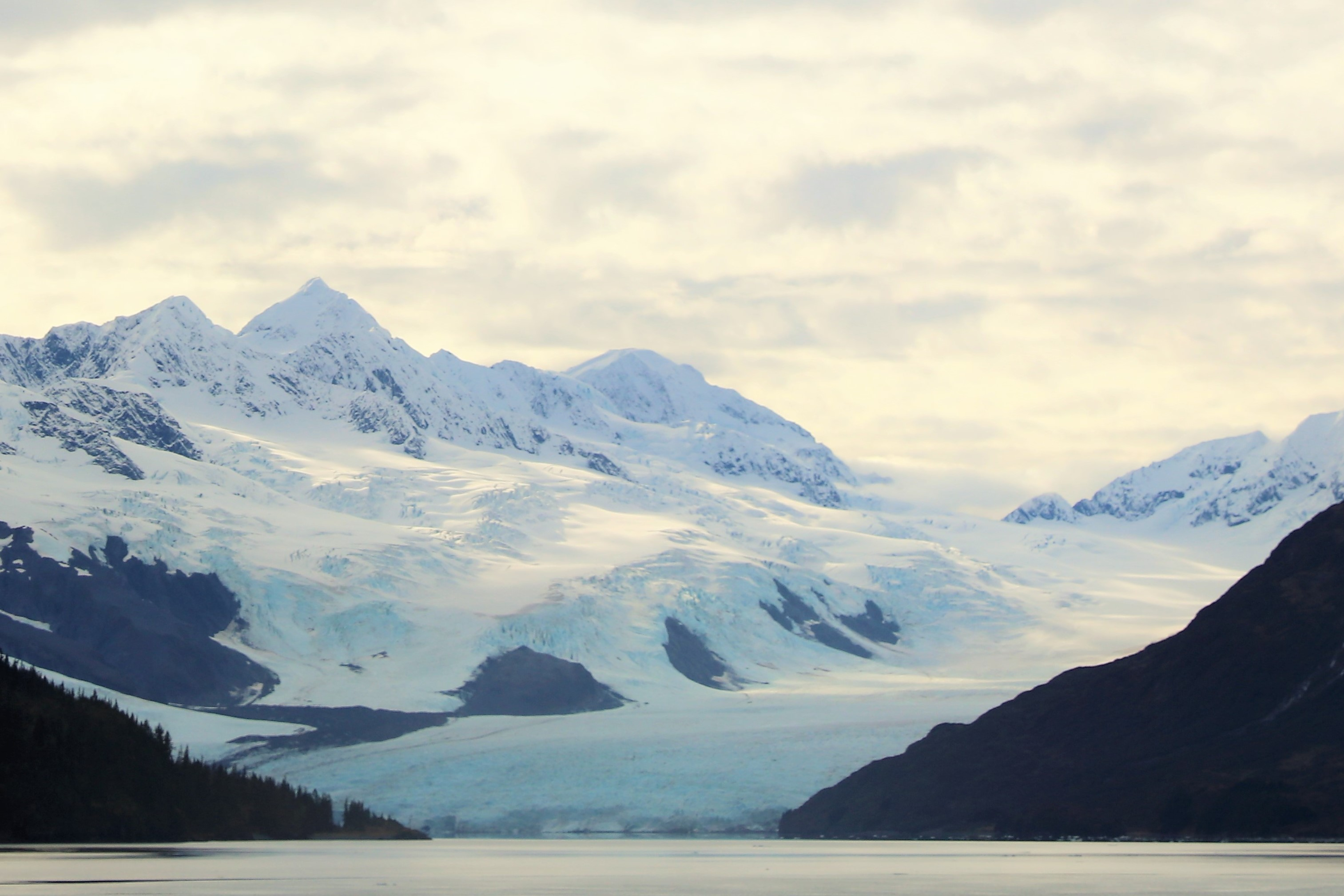
- Harriman Glacier and Passage Peak

- Location within Alaska
- Interactive map of Harriman Glacier
- Type: tidewater glacier
- Location: Harriman Fjord, Anchorage and Valdez-Cordova Census Area, Alaska, U.S.
- Coordinates: 60°58′30″N 148°26′30″W
- Length: 8 mi (13 km)
- Terminus: Sealevel

Harriman Glacier is an 8-mile (13 km) long glacier in the U.S. state of Alaska. It trends northeast from Passage Peak to its terminus at the head of Harriman Fjord, 16 mi (26 km) northeast of Whittier, Chugach Mountains. It was named by members of the 1899 Harriman Alaska Expedition after Edward H. Harriman, who funded the expedition.

== See also ==
- List of glaciers
