= Passage Peak =

Mountain summit in Alaska, United States

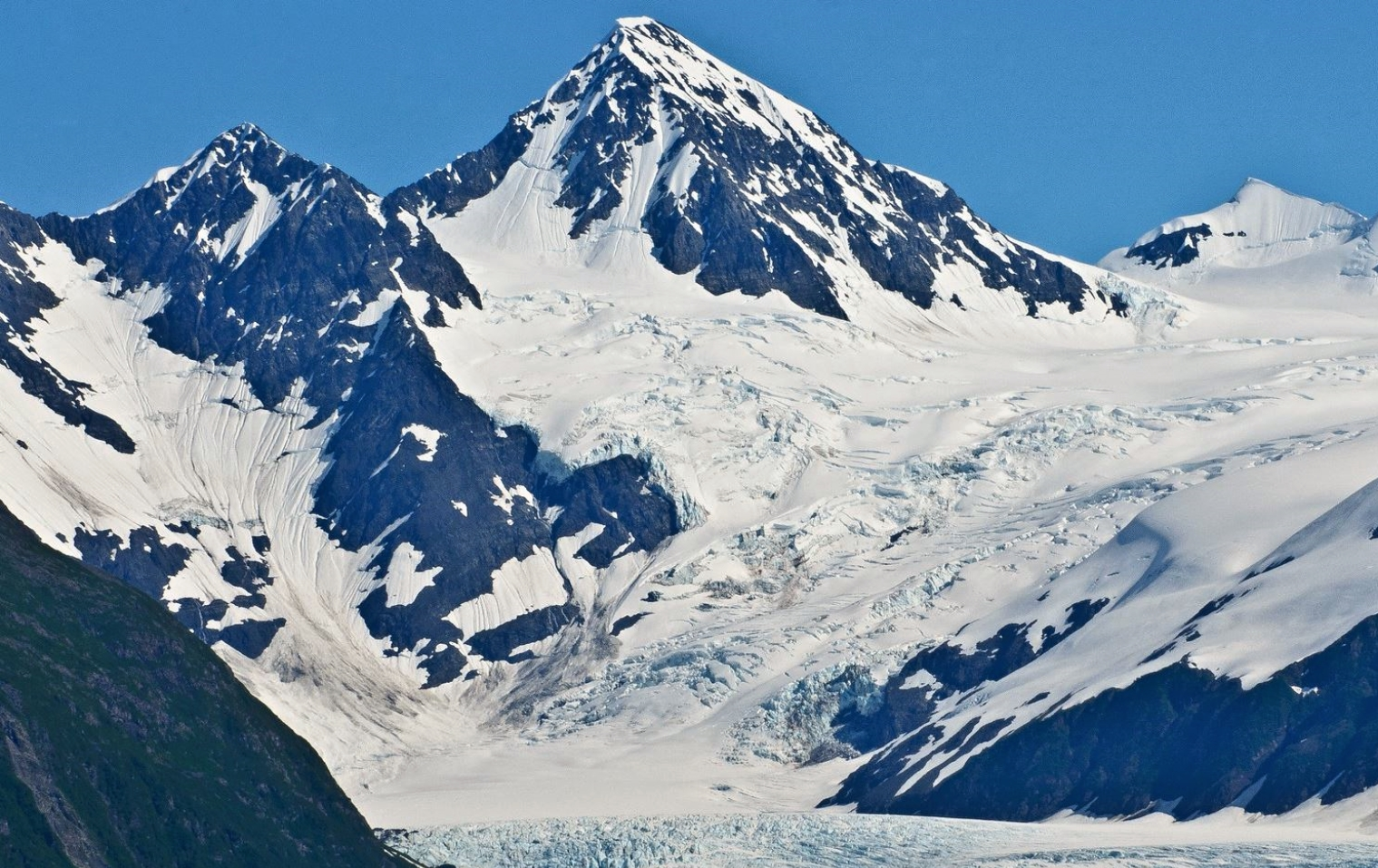
- Passage Peak and Billings Glacier

Highest point
- Elevation: 5,990 ft (1,830 m)
- Prominence: 2,690 ft (820 m)
- Isolation: 5.2 mi (8.4 km)
- Coordinates: 60°54′07″N 148°33′59″W

Geography
- Location within Alaska
- Interactive map of Passage Peak
- Location: Anchorage Borough; Alaska, United States
- Parent range: Chugach Mountains
- Topo map: USGS Seward D-5

Passage Peak is a prominent 5,990-foot (1,826 m) mountain summit located in the Chugach Mountains, in the U.S. state of Alaska. The unofficially named peak is situated in Chugach National Forest, 9 mi (14 km) northeast of Whittier, Alaska, near the isthmus of the Kenai Peninsula, where the Chugach Mountains meet the Kenai Mountains. Nearby peaks include Maynard Mountain and Boggs Peak, each approximately 10 mi (16 km) to the southwest. Although modest in elevation, relief is significant since the southern aspect of the mountain rises up from the tidewater of Prince William Sound's Passage Canal in approximately five miles. The peak takes its name from Passage Canal, which in turn was named in 1794 by Captain George Vancouver, presumably because it leads to a portage connecting Prince William Sound with Cook Inlet.

== Climate ==
Based on the Köppen climate classification, Passage Peak is located in a subarctic climate zone with long, cold, snowy winters, and mild summers. Weather systems coming off the Gulf of Alaska are forced upwards by the Chugach Mountains (orographic lift), causing heavy precipitation in the form of rainfall and snowfall. Temperatures can drop below −20 °C with wind chill factors below −30 °C. This climate supports the Billings Glacier on the south aspect, and immense Harriman Glacier on the north slope.

== Gallery ==
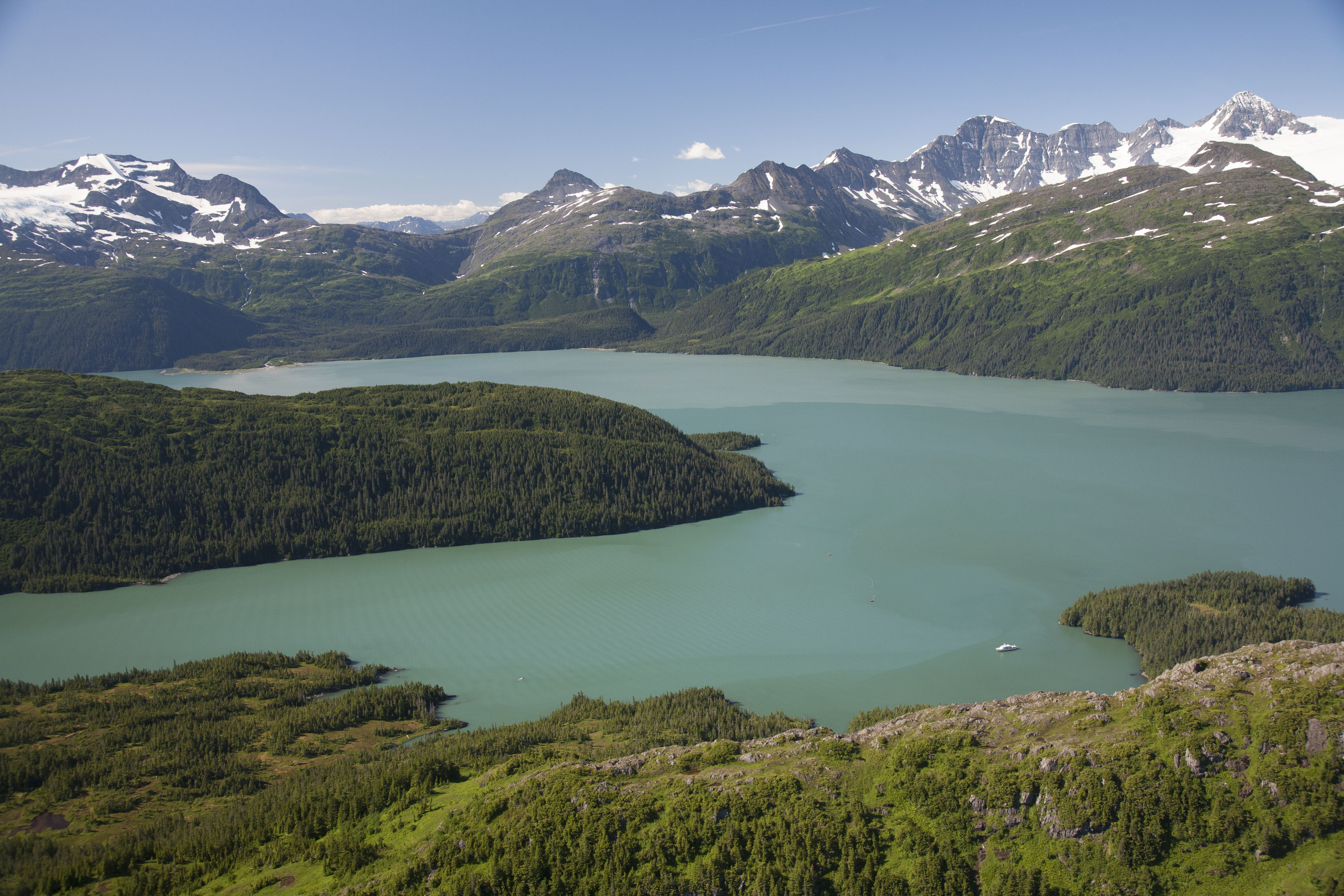
Passage Peak upper right, and Passage Canal
(Lowell Peak in upper left corner)

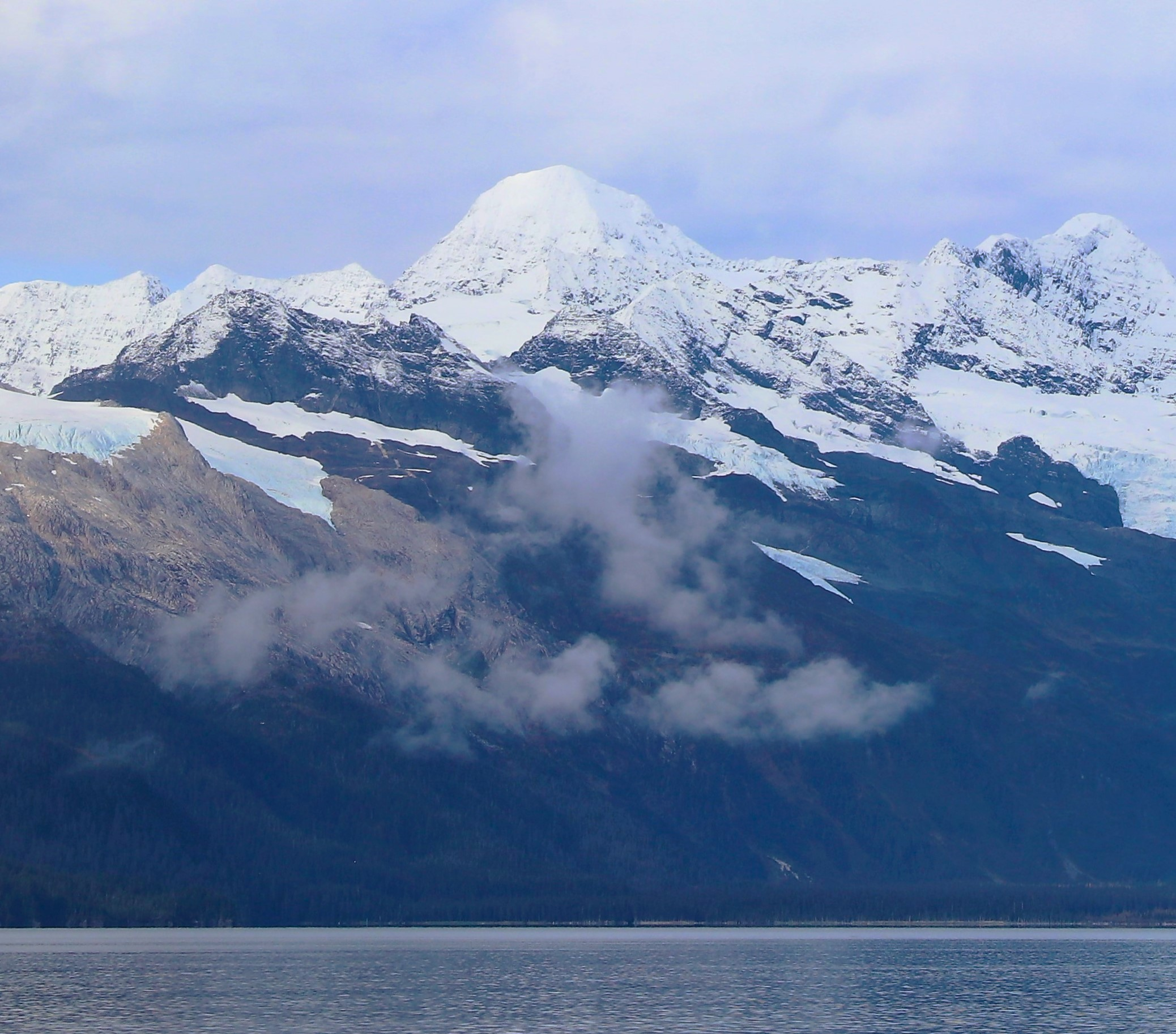
Passage Peak from the southeast

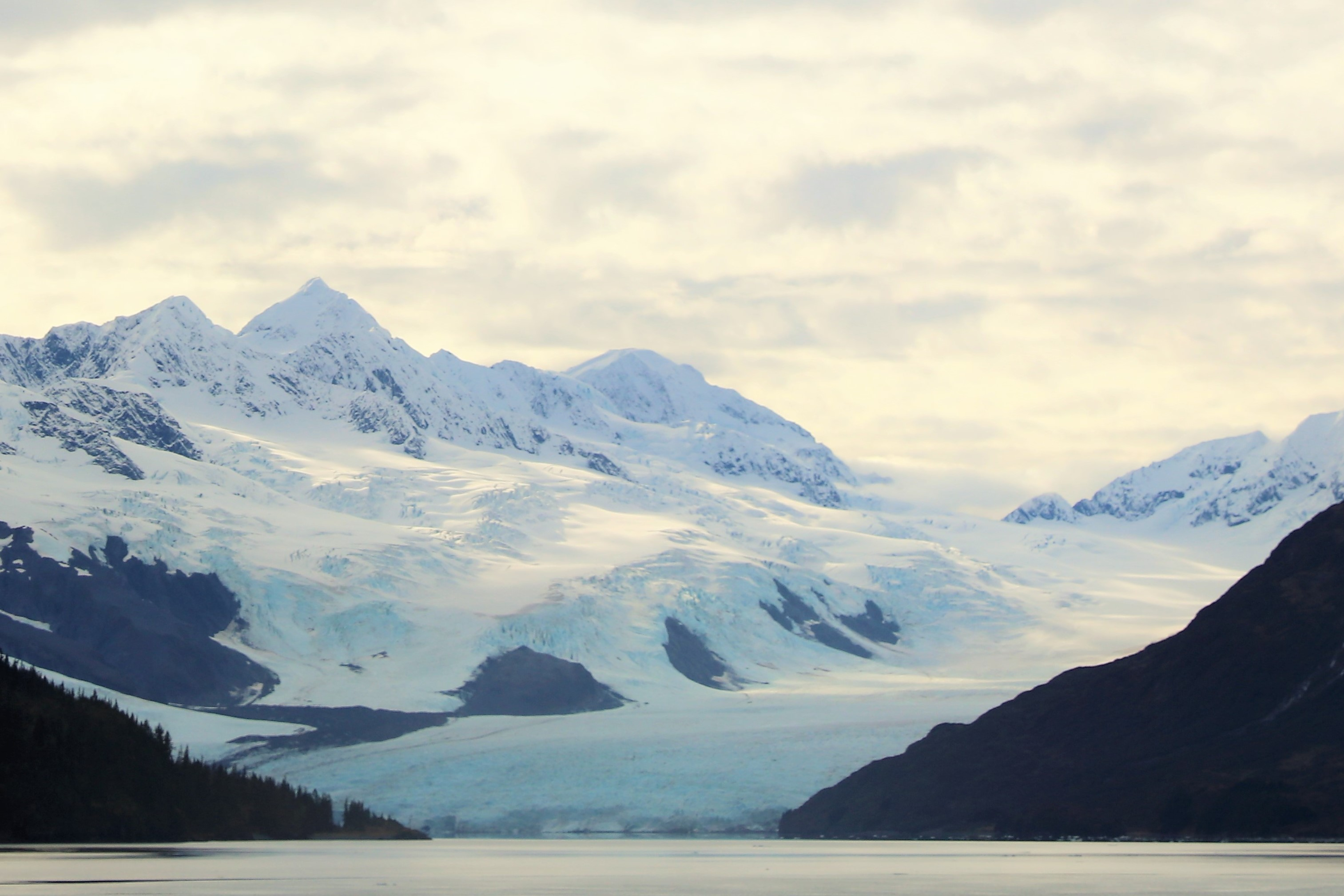
Passage Peak (left) from the northeast viewed with Harriman Glacier

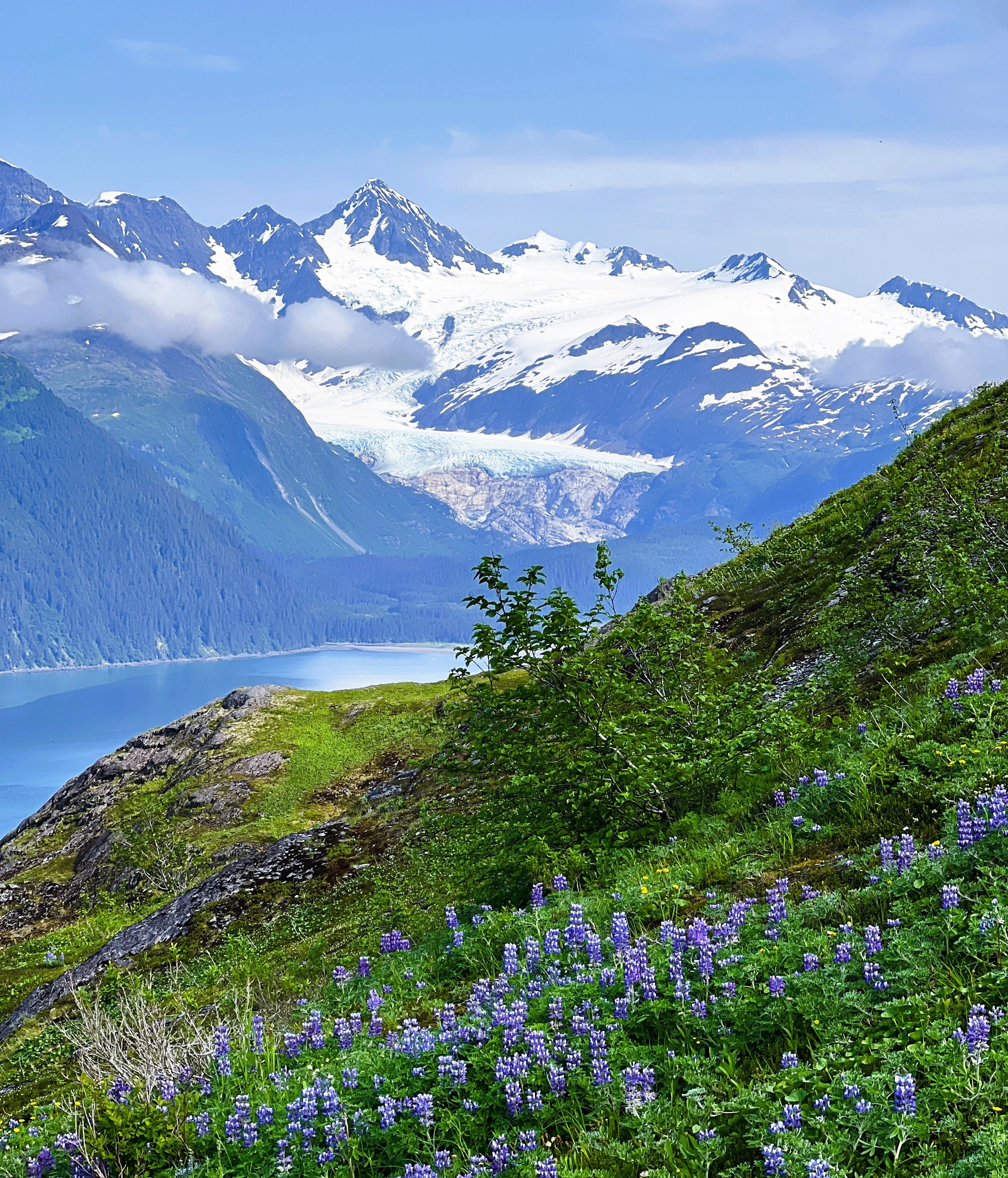
Passage Peak, Passage Canal and Billings Glacier

== See also ==
- List of mountain peaks of Alaska
- Geography of Alaska
