= Nikolski Air Station =

- IATA: IKO; ICAO: PAKO; FAA LID: IKO

Summary
- Airport type: Private
- Owner: Aleut Corporation
- Serves: Nikolski, Alaska
- Location: Umnak Island
- Elevation AMSL: 77 ft / 23 m
- Coordinates: 52°56′30″N 168°50′56″W

Map
- Location of airport in Alaska

Runways
| Direction | Length | | Surface |
| Direction | ft | m | Surface |
|---|---|---|---|
| 8/26 | 3,512 | 1,070 | Gravel |
- Source: Federal Aviation Administration

Nikolski Air Station (IATA: IKO, ICAO: PAKO, FAA LID: IKO) is an unattended airport located in Nikolski on Umnak Island in the Aleutians West Census Area of the U.S. state of Alaska. This former military airport is now owned by The Aleut Corporation.

Scheduled commercial airline passenger service is subsidized by the Essential Air Service program. Current service to Nikolski is provided by Grant Aviation from Unalaska.

As per Federal Aviation Administration records, the airport had 165 passenger boardings (enplanements) in calendar year 2008, 219 enplanements in 2009, and 160 in 2010.

== History ==
The airport was built in 1958 to support Nikolski Air Force Station, a Cold War United States Air Force Distant Early Warning Line radar station on Umnak Island. The station was operated by Detachment 1, 714th Aircraft Control and Warning Squadron based at Cold Bay Air Force Station, near Cold Bay, Alaska. The radar station was inactivated in September 1969, ending military use of the airport. The Air Force remediated the site around 2000, removing all abandoned military structures and returning the site to a natural condition.

== Facilities ==
Nikolski Air Station resides at elevation of 77 feet (23 m) above mean sea level. It has one runway designated 8/26 with a gravel surface measuring 3,512 by 135 feet (1,070 x 41 m).

== Airlines and destinations ==
| Airlines | Destinations |
|---|---|
| Grant Aviation | Unalaska/Dutch Harbor |

== Incidents and accident ==
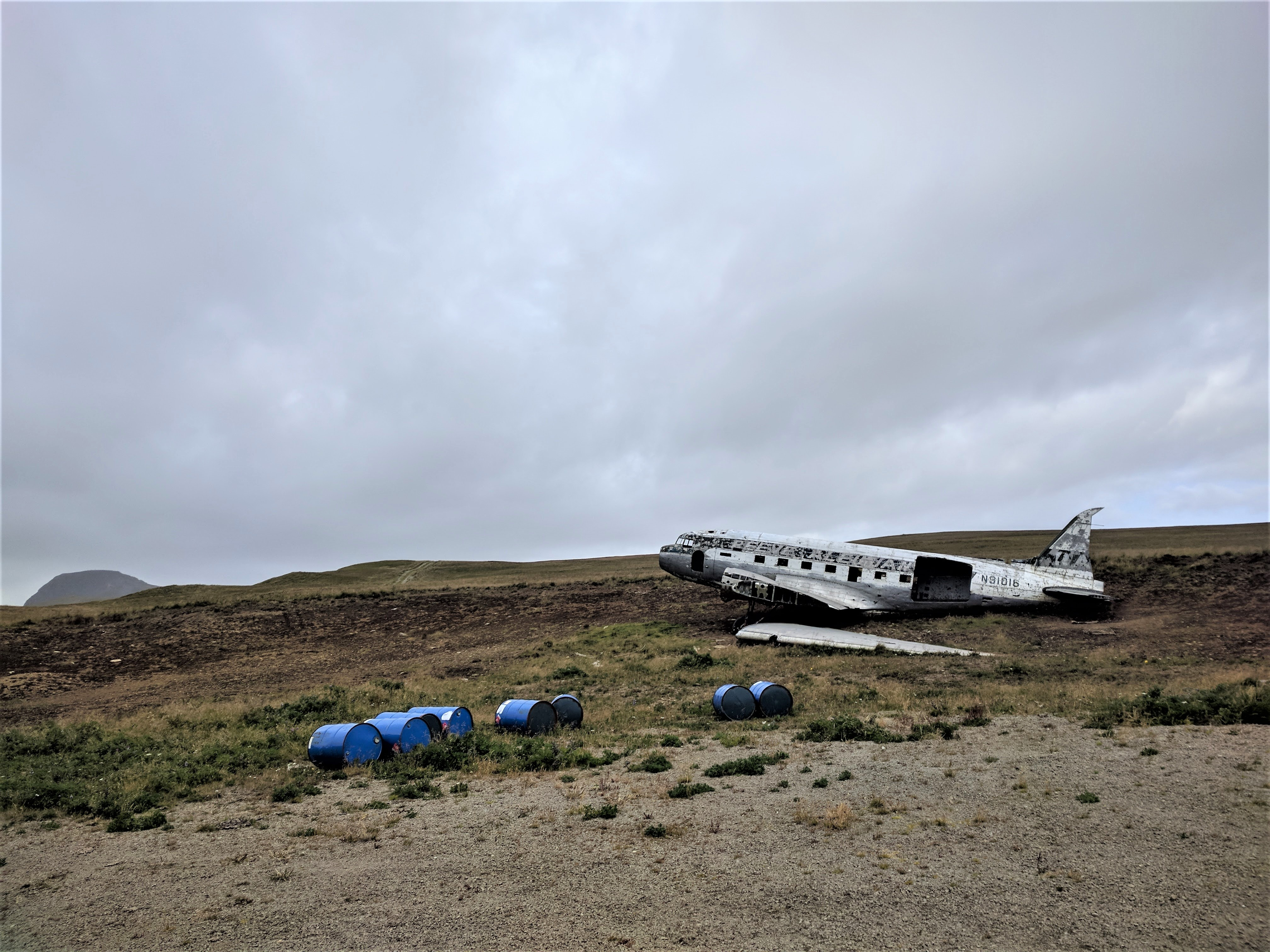
The Reeve Aleutian Airways Douglas C-47A involved in the crash

- On 29 May 1965, a Reeve Aleutian Airways Douglas C-47A (N91016), during the take-off phase, stalled and crashed because a sudden wind gust caused a premature lift-off. The three crew members and the two passengers on board were not injured. The aircraft was damaged beyond repair and left by the side at the end of the airstrip ever since.

== See also ==
- List of airports in Alaska

== Other sources ==
- Essential Air Service documents (Docket DOT-OST-1995-363) from the U.S. Department of Transportation:
  - Order 2004-6-20: re-selecting Peninsula Airways to provide essential air service at Atka and Nikolski, Alaska, at annual subsidy rates of $336,303 and $173,603 per year, respectively, for the period ending June 30, 2006.
  - Order 2006-5-21: re-selecting Alaska Airlines to provide essential air service at Adak, Alaska, at an annual subsidy rate of $1,393,384, and Peninsula Airways for $449,605 at Atka and $314,694 at Nikolski. The three rates extend through June 30, 2008.
  - Order 2008-3-36: re-selecting Alaska Airlines to provide essential air service at Adak, Alaska, at an annual subsidy rate of $1,483,122, and Peninsula Airways for $513,803 at Atka and $469,786 at Nikolski. The three rates extend through June 30, 2010.
  - Order 2010-7-9: re-selecting Alaska Airlines to provide essential air service (EAS) at Adak, Alaska, at an annual subsidy rate of $1,675,703, and Peninsula Airways, Inc., for $290,780 at Atka and $639,008 at Nikolski. The three rates extend through June 30, 2012.
  - Order 2012-5-20 (May 23, 2012): selecting Grant Aviation, Inc., to provide essential air service (EAS) at Atka, Alaska, for $842,574 the first year and $822,445 the second year, and at Nikolski, Alaska, for $331,431 the first year and $324,998 the second year.
