= Joseph Billings =

British-Russian explorer (c. 1758–1806)

Joseph Billings (c. 1758 – 1806) was an English navigator, hydrographer and explorer who spent most of his career in Russian service. From 1790 to 1794 he commanded a marine expedition that searched for a Northeast Passage and explored the coasts of Alaska and Siberia. Between 1797 and 1798 he conducted a hydrographic survey of the Black Sea.

== Life ==
=== Early life ===
Sources provide conflicting details regarding the early life of Joseph Billings. British records show he was born in 1758 at Turnham Green, Middlesex. Parish church registers confirm his birth on 6 September 1758, the son of Thomas and Mary Billing. However, according to Russian sources, Billings told associates he was born in Yarmouth, the son of a fisherman of the same name. He worked on coal ships from an early age and later was apprenticed to a watchmaker. His Russian service record, signed by him, indicates he was born in 1761.

=== Royal Navy Service ===
In 1776, Billings enlisted in the Royal Navy as an able seaman and joined the third and final voyage of James Cook. Billings became an astronomer's assistant, initially aboard HMS Discovery, and then transferring to HMS Resolution in September 1779. The expedition explored the North Pacific, visiting Nootka Sound, Alaska, the Bering Sea, and the Kamchatka Peninsula on the east coast of Russia. When they returned to England in October 1780, Billings was promoted to warrant officer.

Following his return, Billings served aboard the Conquestador and the Crocodile. In July 1782 he became master's mate on the Resistance, serving Captain James King, who had also served on Cook's last voyage. Billings frequently accompanied King on visits to Joseph Banks, president of the Royal Society. He was imprisoned in 1782 for a debt and the Resistance sailed to the West Indies without him. With Banks’ help, he was released from prison on 14 January 1783.

In 1783 he applied through the Russian ambassador Ivan Matveevich Simolin to enter the Russian navy.

=== The Billings Expedition ===
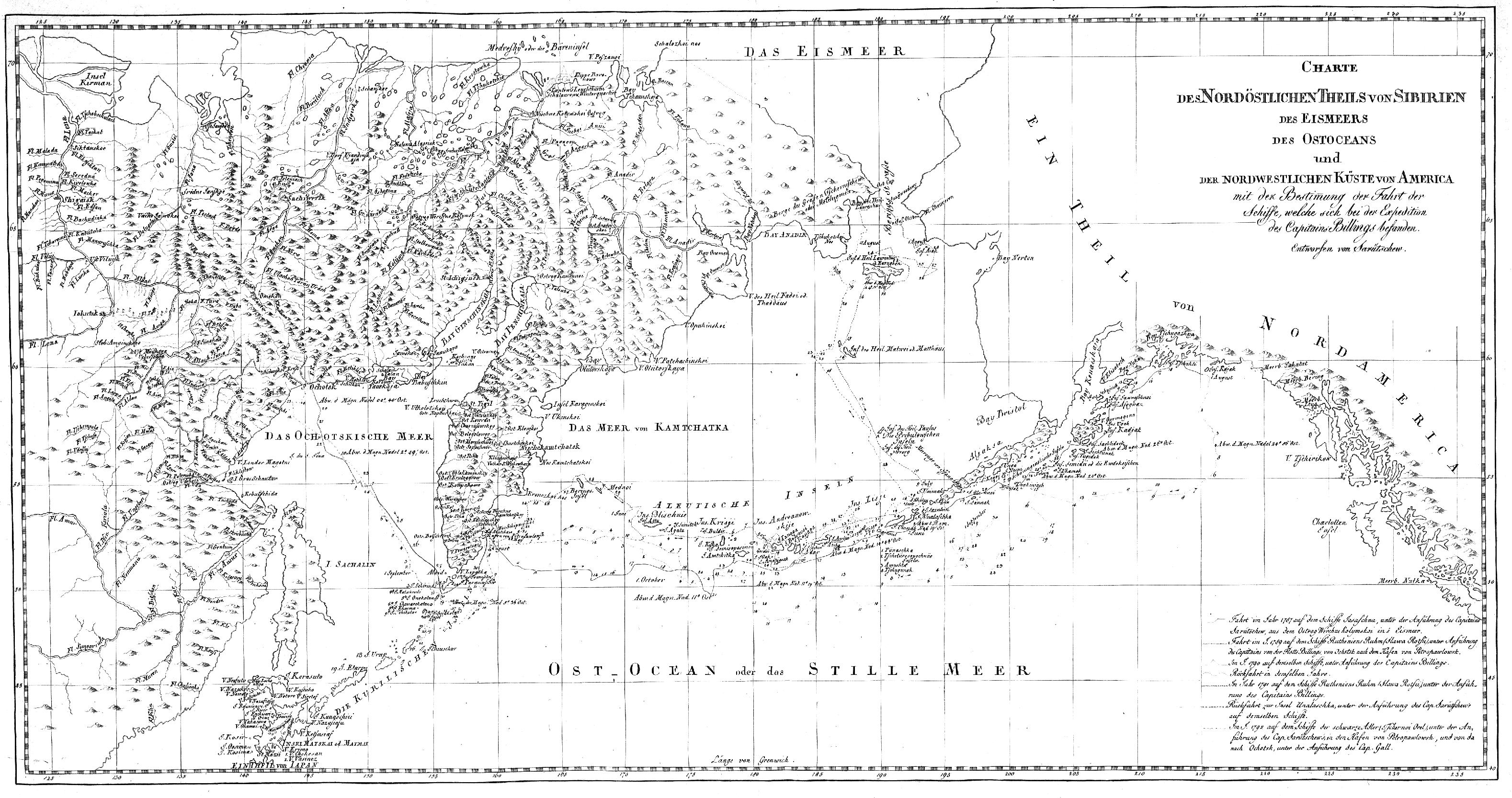
Map of the northeastern part of Siberia, of the Arctic Sea, of the Pacific Ocean, and of the northwestern coast of America with the route of the ships under Captain Billings' command. (1806)

In 1785, the Russian government of Catherine the Great commissioned a new expedition in search for the Northeast Passage, led by Joseph Billings, the Russian officer Gavril Sarychev as his deputy and Carl Heinrich Merck as the expedition's naturalist. Martin Sauer served as secretary and translator. Captains Robert Hall, Gavril Sarychev, and Christian Bering had leading roles. The expedition operated until 1794.

Though considered a failure by some scholars because the expenditures outweighed the results, it nevertheless had a substantial record of achievement. Accurate maps were made of the Chukchi Peninsula in Eastern Siberia, the west coast of Alaska, and the Aleutian Islands. Members of the expedition landed on Kodiak Island and made an examination of the islands and mainlands of Prince William Sound. Additionally, the expedition compiled a census of the native population of the Aleutian Islands and reported to the crown stories of abuse by the Russian fur traders (promyshlenniki).

=== Later years ===
After the expedition, Joseph Billings remained with the Imperial Russian Navy. He was transferred to the Black Sea Fleet at his request. From 1797 to 1798, he conducted a hydrographical survey of the Black Sea. He subsequently published an atlas of this work. In November 1799, he retired and settled in Moscow.

Billings died in Moscow on 18 June 1806, possibly at the age of 48 years.

== Legacy ==
Cape Billings in the Chukotka Autonomous Okrug was named after him.

Billings Glacier on Passage Peak in Alaska was named after him in 1908.

== See also ==
- European and American voyages of scientific exploration

== Sources ==
- "Биллингс или Биллинг, Иосиф" . Brockhaus and Efron Encyclopedic Dictionary (in Russian). 1906.
- Appleby, John H. (2008). "Billings, Joseph (1758–1806)". Oxford Dictionary of National Biography. Oxford University Press.
- Moir, John S. (1983). "Billings, Joseph". In Halpenny, Francess G. (ed.). Dictionary of Canadian Biography. Vol. V (1801–1820) (online ed.). University of Toronto Press.
