= Driftwood Bay Air Force Station Airfield =

Driftwood Bay Air Force Station
- IATA: none; ICAO: PAAM; FAA LID: AK23

Summary
- Airport type: Private / military
- Owner: U.S. Air Force
- Location: Unalaska Island, Alaska
- Elevation AMSL: 24 ft (7.3 m)
- Coordinates: 53°58′19″N 166°51′26.6″W

Map
- Location of airport in Alaska

Runways
Direction	Length		Surface
Direction	ft	m	Surface
14/32	3,500	1,067	Gravel
- Source: Federal Aviation Administration

Driftwood Bay Air Force Station (ICAO: PAAM, FAA LID: AK23) is a private use military airstrip located 13 nautical miles (15 mi, 24 km) northwest of Unalaska Island, in the Aleutians East Borough of the U.S. state of Alaska. It is privately owned by the United States Air Force. The facility is not open for public use.

== Overview ==
Driftwood Bay Air Force Station Airfield is an unattended United States Air Force gravel airstrip. Its present condition is undetermined.

The airport was built in 1958 to support Driftwood Bay Air Force Station, a Cold War United States Air Force Distant Early Warning Line radar station. The station was operated by Detachment 2, 714th Aircraft Control and Warning Squadron based at Cold Bay Air Force Station, near Cold Bay, Alaska. The radar station was inactivated in September 1969, ending military use of the airport. The Air Force remediated the site around 2000, removing all abandoned military structures and returning the site to a natural condition.

It is not staffed by any support personnel, and is not open to the public. During the winter months, it may be inaccessible due to the extreme weather conditions at the location.

== Facilities ==
Driftwood Bay Air Force Station Airport covers an area of 459 acres (186 ha) at an elevation of 24 feet (7 m) above mean sea level. It has one runway designated 14/32 with a gravel surface measuring 3,500 by 100 feet (1,067 x 30 m).

== See also ==
- List of airports in Alaska
