= Martin Sauer (explorer) =

Martin Sauer (fl. 1785–1806) was an English civil servant, stockbroker and explorer.

== Life ==
There is very little information available about Sauer's life. He resided in Saint Petersburg from at least 1792. He knew many languages (English, Russian, French and German).

Sauer got to know Joseph Billings in the 1780s in Saint Petersburg. He was also acquainted with Peter Simon Pallas. After the request of both, he agreed to take part in Billings's expedition as his secretary and translator (i.e., interpreter) on condition that he would be allowed to publish an account of it upon his return. The expedition lasted nine years, and it carried the objects for which it had been organised with success.

The expedition returned to St Petersburg on 10 March 1794. Sauer was at that time in a very critical state of health, suffering from rheumatism. In his apartment he had hidden a diary, some notes and also possibly other secret materials from the expedition. Billings cautioned members of the Admiralty that Sauer might publish them to the world before the Empress Catherine the Great would like. As a result, Billings received permission to search Sauer's room, but the only things he found were a few draft notes. Sauer claimed he had burned the material.

The doctors' recommendation being that he should visit a milder climate for some time, Sauer was released from Russian service and left for England where he published the first printed description of the expedition. There is some controversy regarding his activities after his return to St Petersburg in 1794. Suggestion has been made that he set off hurriedly for England in order to publish his account before the Russian authorities and scholars of the Russian Academy of Sciences could review its details. The Russians suspected that his illness had been simulated and had only been a ruse in order to be released from Russian service and prevent his apartment from being too thoroughly inspected. Sauer later was stockbroker in the St Petersburg exchange either resuming a former occupation or forging a new career for himself.

== Work ==
Sauer published his account in London in 1802 under the title of An account of a geographical and astronomical expedition to the northern parts of Russia: for ascertaining the degrees of latitude and longitude of the mouth of the river Kovima, of the whole coast of the Tshutski, to East Cape, and of the islands in the eastern ocean, stretching to the American coast, performed ... by Commodore Joseph Billings, in the years 1785, &c to 1794.

Sauer says that his report was "taken from the journal written for Captain Billings, which I copied from the ship's journal kept by the Master Batakoff and his mates" (p.xiii). However, his narrative is also based on his own notes and recollections. He explicitly says, "During my travels, I was frequently necessitated to take notes on small pieces of paper; those I have faithfully transcribed; but in some instances I have been obliged to refer to memory" (p. xii). William Beloe also contributed to the work by helping with the style.

In Europe not much information was available concerning the Billings expedition since 1790. It was even considered secretive. For this reason Sauer's work was received with much anticipation.

Sauer's narrative is not the only contemporary account of the expedition. Two other contemporary accounts were written; one by Gavril Sarychev and the other one by Carl Heinrich Merck. However, Sauer's account is considered to be the fullest one.

== List of works ==
- An account of a geographical and astronomical expedition to the northern parts of Russia: for ascertaining the degrees of latitude and longitude of the mouth of the river Kovima, of the whole coast of the Tshutski, to East Cape, and of the islands in the eastern ocean, stretching to the American coast, performed ... by Commodore Joseph Billings, in the years 1785, &c to 1794 (1802)

== Translations ==
=== Into French ===
- Voyage fait par ordre de l'impératrice de Russie, Catherine II: dans le nord de la Russie asiatique, dans la mer Glaciale, dans la mer d'Anadyr, et sur les côtes de l'Amérique, depuis 1785 jusqu'en 1794, par le commodore Billings (1802) translated by Jean-Henri Castéra (2 volumes): Volume 1 Volume 2

=== Into German ===
- Reise Nach Den Nordlichen Gegenden Vom Russischen Asien und America Unter Dem Commodor Joseph Billings in Den Jahren 1785 Bis 1794 (1803) translated by Matthias Christian Sprengel

=== Into Italian ===
- Viaggio fatto per ordine dell' imperatrice di Russia Caterina n, nel nord della Russia asiatica, nel Mare Glaciale, nel Mare d'Anadyr, e sulla costa nord-ouest dell' America, dal 1785 fino al 1794 dal commodoro Billings, scritto dal sig. Sauer translated by Luigi Bossi (2 volumes): Volume 1 Volume 2
