= Raikoke =

Uninhabited island in the Kuril Island chain

Native name: Райкоке (Russian); 雷公計島 (Japanese)
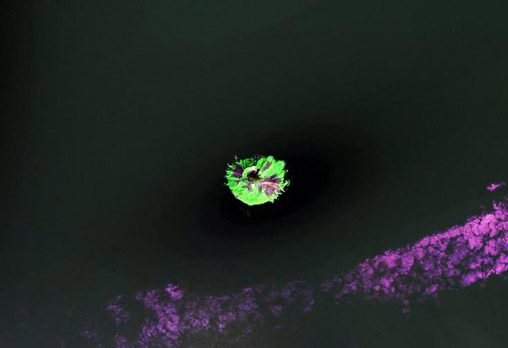
- NASA Landsat view of Raikoke Island

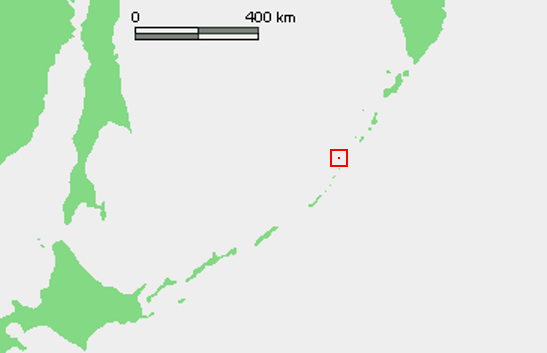

Geography
- Location: Sea of Okhotsk
- Coordinates: 48°17′31″N 153°15′04″E
- Archipelago: Kuril Islands
- Area: 4.6 km^{2} (1.8 sq mi)
- Highest elevation: 551 m (1808 ft)
- Highest point: Pik Raikoke

Administration
- Russia

Demographics
- Population: 0

Raikoke or Raykoke (Russian: Райкоке; Japanese: 雷公計島, romanized: Raikoke-tō) is an uninhabited volcanic island near the centre of the Kuril Islands chain in the Sea of Okhotsk in the northwest Pacific Ocean, 16 kilometres (9.9 mi) distant from the island of Matua. Its name is derived from the Ainu language, from the Hokkaido Ainu word "hellmouth".

== Geology ==
Raikoke is roughly circular, with a length of 2.5 km (1.6 mi) with a width of 2.0 kilometres (1.2 mi), and an area of 4.6 km^{2} (1.8 sq mi). The island is a stratovolcano, its lava composed primarily of basalt. The cone rises above a submarine terrace with a depth of 130 m (430 ft) to a maximum height of 551 m (1,808 ft) above sea level. The steep-walled crater is 700 m (2,300 ft) wide and 200 m (660 ft) deep with lava flows extending along the eastern half of the island. The volcano has most recently erupted in 1765, 1778, 1924 and 2019. The 1778 and 1924 Raikoke eruptions were classified on the Volcanic Explosivity Index scale (that ranges from zero to eight) as VEI-4 or greater. For comparison the volcano Anak Krakatoa eruption in 2018 was also rated as a VEI-4 event. The 1778 eruption of Raikoke was the largest of the recent volcanic events destroying the upper third of the island. The only known fatalities from the eruptions was during the 1778 eruption when fifteen were killed from falling lava bombs.

=== 2019 eruption ===
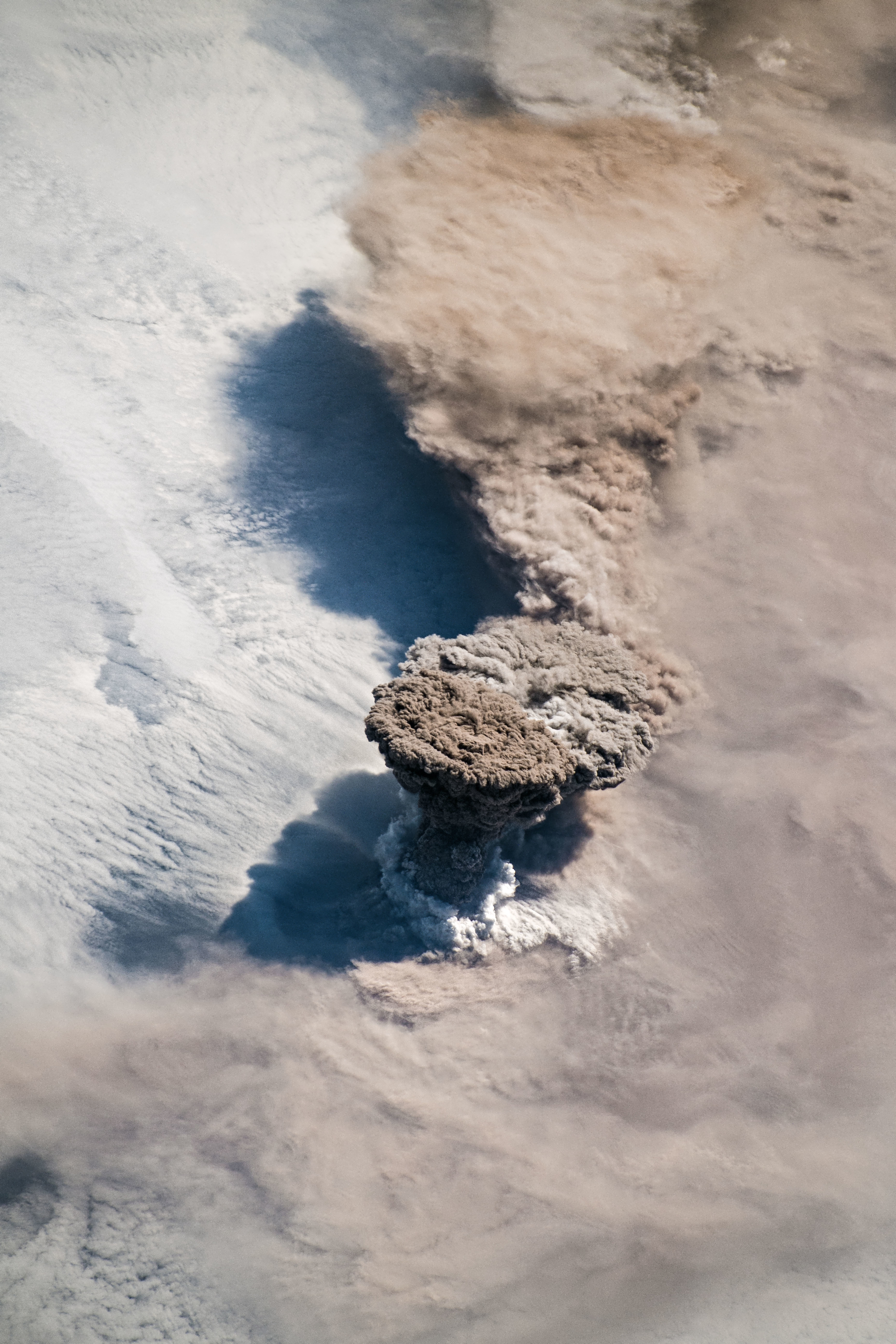
Raikoke emits a plume of ash and volcanic gases in the 2019 eruption.

At approximately 4:03 am, 22 June 2019 it erupted, with a plume of ash and gas reaching between 13,000 m (43,000 ft) and 17,000 m (56,000 ft), passing the tropopause and allowing stratospheric injection of ash and sulfur dioxide.

A study with the ESA satellite Sentinel-5P revealed volcano's sulphur dioxide plume had clustered into distinct structures in the 72 hours following the eruption. One of these plumes was a swirling stratospheric mass of sulphur dioxide that circled the globe three times and ascended to an altitude of some 27 km (17 mi) through the radiative heating of ash. Sentinel-5P and NASA's CALIPSO mission showed signs of anticyclonic motion for this plume. The ESA satellite Aeolus confirmed that the structure was anticyclonic. Such self-containing and long-lived anticyclonic structures have long been associated with large wildfires, but stable volcanic plumes are seldom reported and only form in certain conditions.

== Fauna ==
Raikoke is one of five major Steller sea lion rookeries on the Kuril Islands and in the spring and summer it is home to one of the largest northern fulmar aggregations on the Kurils; crested and parakeet auklet, pigeon guillemot, and black-legged kittiwake also nest on the island. Captain Henry James Snow reported that in 1883 some 15,000 northern fur seals inhabited the island. However, by the 1890s only "a few scores" were recorded captured there, almost certainly due to overexploitation by fur hunters. Currently no fur seals reproduce on Raikoke.

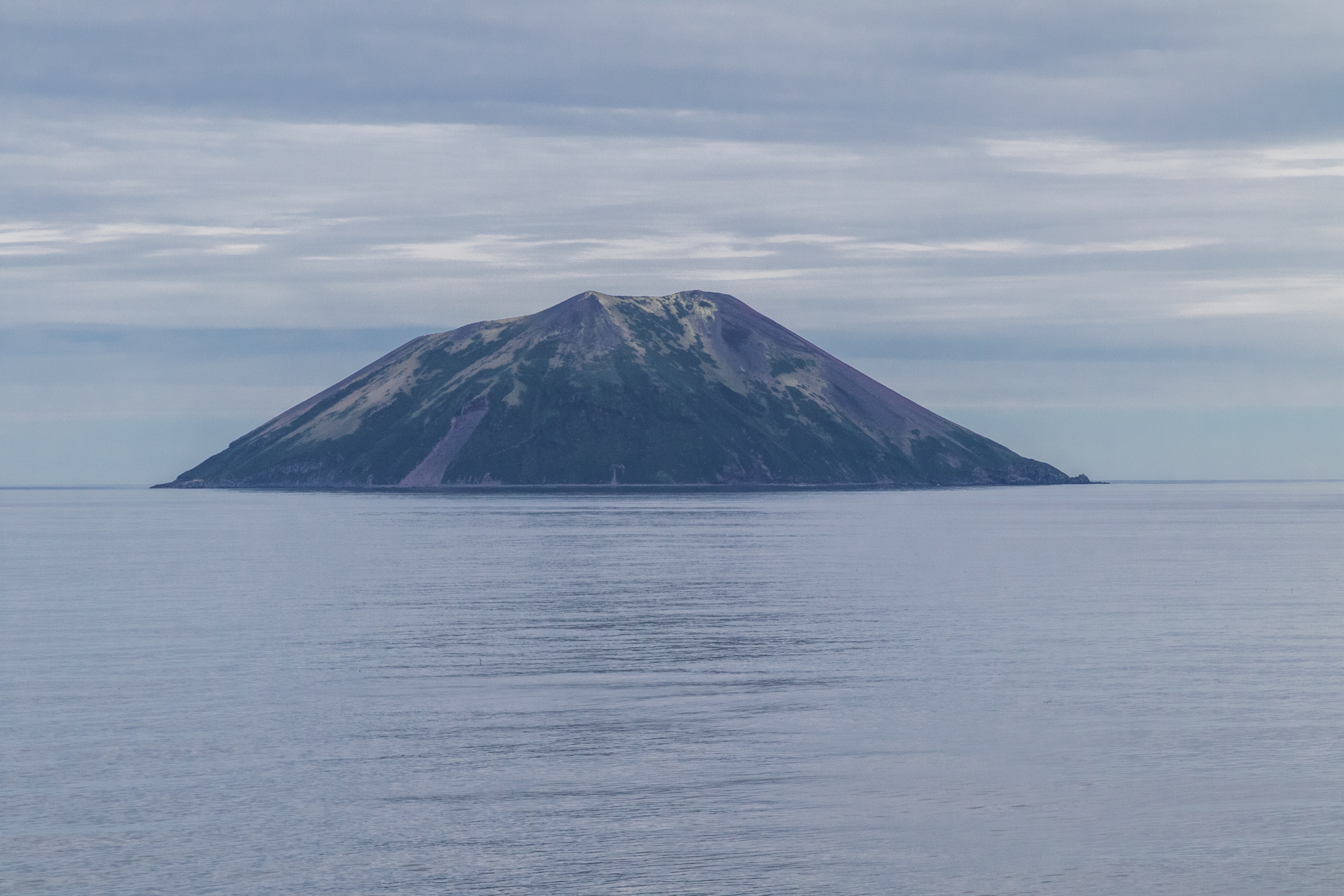
Raikoke Island as seen from the Golovnin Strait

== History ==
Raikoke was visited by hunting and fishing parties of the Ainu, but there was no permanent habitation at the time of European contact. The island appears on an official map showing the territories of Matsumae Domain, a feudal domain of Edo Japan dated 1644, and these holdings were officially confirmed by the Tokugawa shogunate in 1715. It was subsequently claimed by the Russian Empire; sovereignty initially passed to Russia under the terms of the Treaty of Shimoda, but was returned to the Empire of Japan per the Treaty of Saint Petersburg along with the rest of the Kuril islands.

The island was formerly administered as part of Shimushu District of Nemuro Subprefecture of Hokkaidō. After World War II, it came under the control of the Soviet Union, and is now administered as part of the Sakhalin Oblast of Russia.

== See also ==
- List of volcanoes in Russia
