= Cape Sarichef Airport =

Airport in Unimak Island, Alaska, US

- IATA: WSF; ICAO: PACS; FAA LID: 26AK

Summary
- Airport type: Private
- Owner: U.S. Fish & Wildlife Service
- Location: Unimak Island
- Elevation AMSL: 291 ft (89 m)
- Coordinates: 54°35′04″N 164°54′21″W

Map
- Location of airport in Alaska

Runways
Direction	Length		Surface
Direction	ft	m	Surface
6/24	1,900	579	Gravel
16/34	3,500	1,067	Gravel
- Source: Federal Aviation Administration

Cape Sarichef Airport (IATA: WSF, ICAO: PACS, FAA LID: 26AK) was a small landing strip located on the western end of Unimak Island in the Aleutian Islands of the U.S. state of Alaska. It was used to supply and support a United States Coast Guard LORAN station and U.S. Air Force DEW Line site during the Cold War.

It is now a private-use facility owned by the U.S. Fish & Wildlife Service and managed by the Izembek National Wildlife Refuge.

Cape Sarichef was named in 1816 by Russian explorer Otto von Kotzebue after Admiral Gavril Sarychev of the Imperial Russian Navy.

== Facilities ==
Cape Sarichef Airport has two runways:

- Runway 16/34: 3,500 x 120 ft. (1,067 x 37 m), surface: gravel
- Runway 6/24: 1,900 x 90 ft. (579 x 27 m), surface: gravel

== History ==
The airport was built in 1958 to support Cape Sarichef Air Force Station, a Cold War United States Air Force Distant Early Warning Line radar station. The station was operated by Detachment 3, 714th Aircraft Control and Warning Squadron based at Cold Bay Air Force Station, near Cold Bay, Alaska. The radar station was inactivated in September 1969, ending military use of the airport. The Air Force remediated the site around 2000, removing all abandoned military structures and returning the site to a natural condition.
