= Gavril Sarychev =

Russian admiral (1763–1831)

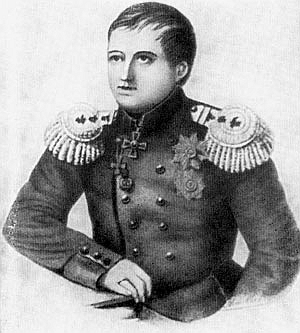
Gavriil Sarychev

Gavril (also Gavriil) Andreyevich Sarychev (Russian: Гаврии́л Андре́евич Са́рычев) (1763 — 11 August (O.S. 30 July) 1831), spelt "Sarichef" in the United States, was a Russian navigator, hydrographer, admiral (1829) and Honorable Member of the Russian Academy of Sciences (1809) in Saint Petersburg.

== Biography ==
Sarychev started his career at the age of eight as a naval cadet and joined the Imperial Russian Navy in 1781. From 1785 to 1794, he took part in the expedition sponsored by Empress Catherine II and led by Royal Navy officer Joseph Billings. Sarychev, on ship Slava Rossii (Glory of Russia), described and mapped the coastline of the Sea of Okhotsk from Okhotsk to Aldoma, many of the Aleutian Islands (especially Unalaska). He also described the islands of Pribylov, St. Matthew Island, St. Lawrence Island, Gvozdev, and King Island.

In 1802–1806, Sarychev led the Baltic hydrographic expedition. He was also in charge of hydrographic research in Russia since 1808 and led the compilation of the Atlas of the Northern Part of the Pacific Ocean in 1826. It includes engraving based on the sketches of the artist Luka Voronin. He became a Vice Admiral in 1808 and a member of the Russian Academy of Sciences the next year. He became an Admiral in 1830 and served briefly as a minister of the navy. He died from cholera during a major outbreak in 1831.

== Legacy ==
Cape Sarichef, Sarychev Peak, Sarychev Range, Sarichef Strait and Sarichef Island in Alaska were named by explorer Lt. Otto von Kotzebue after Gavril Sarychev, who was the Hydrographer General of the Russian Imperial Hydrographic Service between 1827 and 1831.

The Soviet ship Gavril Sarychev was named after the explorer. The Gavril Sarychev took part in the search for Korean Air Lines Flight 007 which was downed by a Soviet Su-15 interceptor just west of Sakhalin Island on 1 September 1983.

== Works ==
- Puteshestvie Flota Kapitana Sarycheva po severovostochnoi chasti Sibiri, Ledovitnomu moriu i Vostochnomu okeanu (1802) - with 51 plates
- Atlas Svernoy chastii Vostochnogo Okeana... (Atlas of the Northern Part of the Pacific Ocean). Compiled in Sheets by the Imperial Navy Department from Latest Reports and Maps, 1826, under the Direction of Vice-Admiral and Hydrographer Sarychev). St. Petersburg, 1826.
- ‘Account of a voyage of discovery to the north-east of Siberia, the frozen ocean, and the north-east sea.’

== See also ==
- Russian Hydrographic Service

== Sources ==
- Puteshestvie flota kapitana Sarycheva po severo-vostochnoy chasti Sibiri, Ledovitomu moriu i Vostochnomu okeanu v prodolzhenie vos'mi let pri Geograficheskoi i Astronomicheskoi morskoi ekspeditsii, byvshei pd nachal'stvom flota kapitana Bellingsa s 1785 po 1793 god. (Travels of Fleet Captain Sarychev in the northeastern part of Siberia, the Arctic Sea and the Eastern Ocean in the course of eight years on the geographic and astronomical naval expedition under Fleet Captain Billings from 1785 to 1793) St. Petersburg, 1802.
- Reeddition: Puteshestvie po severo-vostochnoy chasti Sibiri, Ledovitomu moriu i Vostochnomu okeanu. (A voyage along the northeastern part of Siberia, the Arctic Sea and the Eastern Ocean), edited by N. N. Zubov. Gosudartsvennoye izdatelstvo geograficheskoy literatury. Moscow, 1952.
- (In English) Account of a Voyage of discovery to the Northeast of Siberia, the Frozen Ocean, and the North-east sea, 2 vols, in one. London, 1806–07. Reprint: Amsterdam and New York, 1969.
- The book which recorded the northern Pacific expedition: Geographic Atlas. North-east part of Siberia 1803.
- The Naming of Alaska
- Russian - American Bibliography; by Peter Littke
