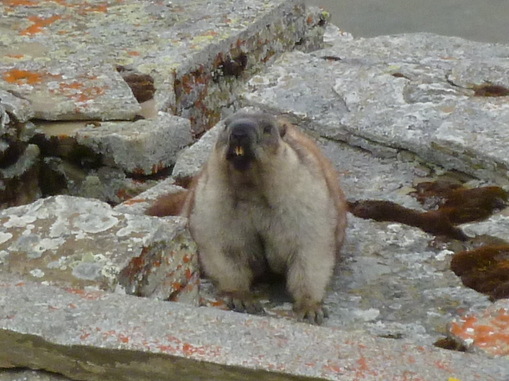

Conservation status
- Least Concern (IUCN 3.1)

- Apparently Secure (NatureServe)

Scientific classification
- Kingdom: Animalia
- Phylum: Chordata
- Class: Mammalia
- Order: Rodentia
- Family: Sciuridae
- Genus: Marmota
- Species: M. broweri

Binomial name
- Marmota broweri Hall & Gilmore, 1934
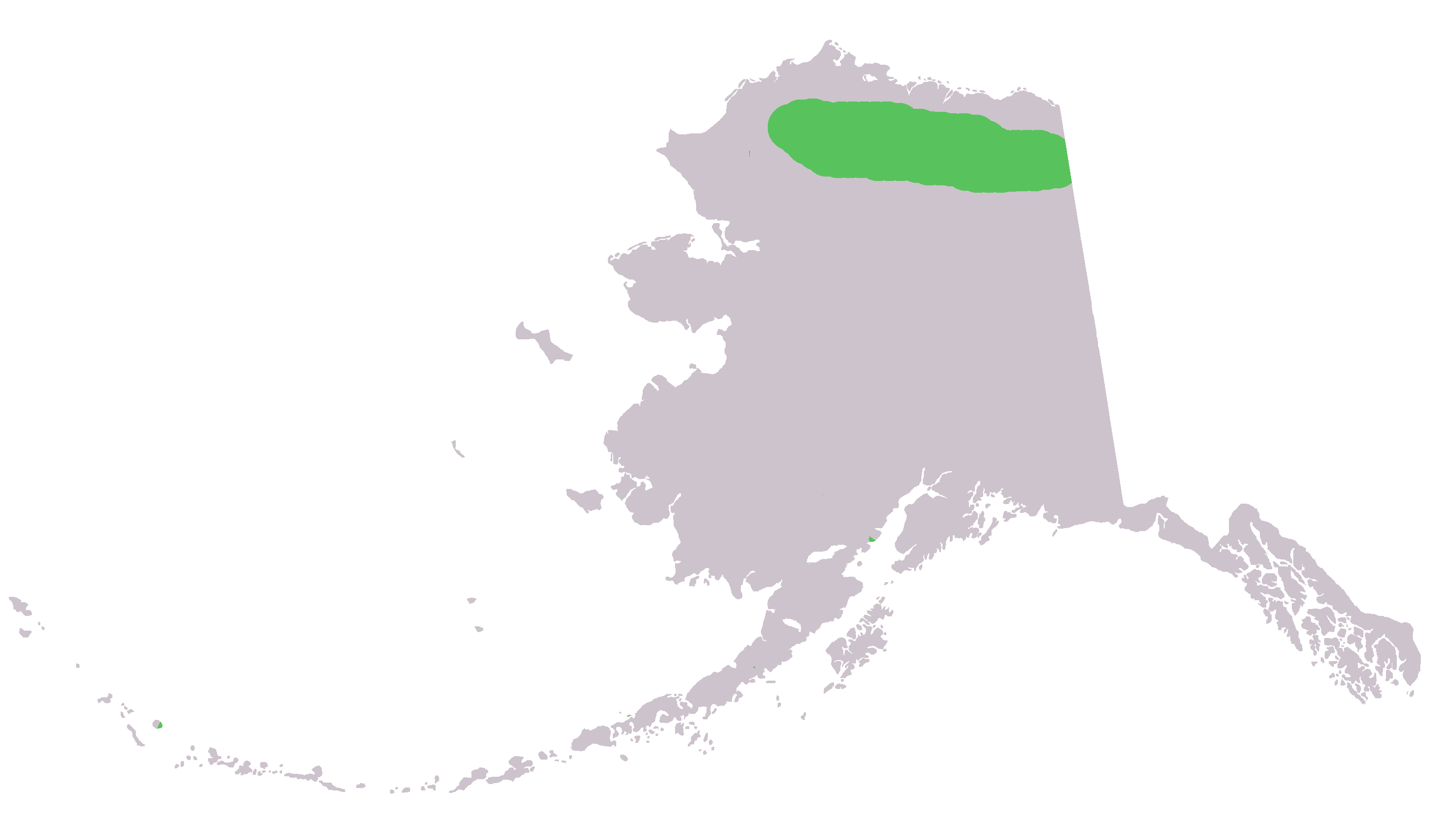
- Range of Marmota broweri in Alaska. Its range also extends slightly into Canada.

= Alaska marmot =

Species of rodent

The Alaska marmot (Marmota broweri), also known as the Brooks Range marmot or the Brower's marmot, is a species of rodent in the family Sciuridae. Once considered to be the same species as the hoary marmot, it is now known to be unique. Alaska marmots are found in the scree slopes of the Brooks Range, Alaska. Specifically, they prefer to dwell on rocky, mountainous terrain, generally near lakes. They eat vegetation found on mountainsides, such as grasses, seeds, and lichen. Their relatively thick bodies are covered in dense, grey fur. They live in large colonies that consist of multiple families. During the winter, they hibernate for long periods of time in burrows. While not well researched, they are not believed to be particularly threatened, by human activity or otherwise. The Alaskan government has designated February 2 as "Marmot Day", a holiday intended to recognize the prevalence of marmots in the state, similar to the more widely celebrated American holiday of Groundhog Day.

== Taxonomy ==
Marmota broweri was described as a subspecies of the hoary marmot, M. caligata, but was later raised to species-level based on karyotypic differences. Studies are still needed to evaluate the effects of genetic isolation on their fragmented distribution.

=== Evolution ===
The Alaska marmot's ancestry traces to the Pleistocene epoch. There are no known fossils of Marmota broweri. However, a fossil reportedly belonging to M. flavescens that is dated to the Late Pleistocene, recovered from the Trail Creek Caves on the Seward Peninsula has been hypothesized as being an incorrect identification of an M. broweri fossil.

The evolutionary lineages of the 14 marmot species distributed across the Holarctic are relatively ambiguous. Cytochrome b sequences indicated that M. broweri is most likely related to M. caudata, M. menzbieri, M. marmota, and M. monax. In support to the cytochrome b results, experimentation involving mitochondrial DNA has suggested that M. broweri is most likely related to M. caudata and M. menzbieri. However, morphological data have linked M. broweri to M. camtschatica. In addition, somatic chromosome analysis, ecological data, and behavioral data have shown that there is a link between M. broweri and M. caligata.

== Distribution and habitat ==
=== Distribution ===
In terms of global distribution, the Alaska marmot is Nearctic. Alaska marmots inhabit the mountains that lie north of the Yukon and Porcupine rivers in central and northern Alaska—including the Brooks Range, Ray Mountains, and Kokrines Hills. However, there have been reports of Alaska marmots in the Richardson Mountains in the northern Yukon Territory but these sightings have not yet been confirmed. Their overall distribution is still poorly understood. The International Union for Conservation of Nature (IUCN) does not consider their population "severely fragmented", but the Alaska Department of Fish and Game has described it as "patchy".

Alaska marmots are found scattered throughout Alaska as small colonies, each consisting of several families. Their locations have been documented in the Brooks Range from Lake Peters to Cape Lisburne and Cape Sabine. There have been sightings of the species near rivers in the Northern Baird mountains, in the Mulik Hills, near Copter Peak in the De Long Mountains, and south of the Brooks Range in the Spooky Valley and in the Kokrines Hills.

=== Habitat ===
The Alaska marmots are found in grassland, inland cliffs, and mountain peaks. They are located at elevations of about 1,000 metres (3,300 ft) to 1,200 metres (3,900 ft). They are often found in boulder fields, rock slides and outcrops, terminal moraines, and Talus slopes in Alpine tundra with herbaceous forage. The species inhabits slopes surrounding lakes, and are found less commonly away from lakes. Alaska marmots inhabit permanent winter dens that are used for as long as twenty years. The entrances are plugged with vegetation, dirt, and feces. These dens are usually located near a ledge which functions as an observation post. A colony consists of several individual family burrows built in close proximity to one another. Their fur coloration helps them blend in amongst rocks.

== Description ==
Alaskan marmots possess a short neck, broad and short head, small ears, short powerful legs and feet, bushy and densely furred tail, and a thick body covered in coarse hair. Adult Alaska marmots' fur on their nose and the dorsal part of their head are usually of a dark color. Their feet may be light or dark in color. M. broweri have tough claws adapted for digging, however the thumbs of their front limbs do not have these claws but flat nails instead. Their body size is highly variable due to hibernation cycles. For males, the average total length is 61 centimetres (24 in) and the average weight is 3.6 kilograms (7.9 lb). Adult females are slightly smaller, having an average length of 58 centimetres (23 in) and 3.2 kilograms (7.1 lb).

=== Anatomical distinctions ===
The retina of the eye of Alaska marmots is entirely lacking of rods, making their night vision quite poor. Their eyes also lack a fovea, making their visual acuity much worse than other rodents. The location of their eyes makes their field of vision very wide, sideways and upward. Like other rodents, Alaska marmots have incisors that do not stop growing. There is a single pair of incisors in each jaw.

Compared to the very similar hoary marmot, also found in Alaska, M. broweri are much softer. They also lack the characteristic white facial patch of hoary marmots. The groundhog, another Alaskan marmot, can be told apart by its more reddish coloring, as compared to the grayer Alaskan and hoary marmots.

== Ecology ==
=== Diet ===
The Alaska marmot's main nutrition source is vegetation that grows on mountain sides, which includes grasses, flowers, fruits, grains, legumes, lichen, and occasionally insects. M. bromeri must eat large amounts due to the low nutritional value and the need to prepare for hibernation. Alaska marmots are typically known as omnivores but they have also been described as insectivorous, folivorous, frugivorous, and granivorous.

=== Predation ===
The Alaska marmot is preyed on by wolverines, gray wolves, grizzly bears, coyotes, and foxes. Eagles, particularly the golden eagle, are a major predator of younger marmots.

A sentry marmot will alert the colony via a two-toned, high-pitched warning call if there is a predator in the area. The older marmots will defend and keep a lookout for predators while the young play. Dens dug solely in dirt provide limited protection, but a den built under rocks and boulders can prevent the risk from large animals, such as grizzly bears, who dig marmots out of their dirt-dug dens.

=== Ecosystem impact ===
Marmots enrich soil with uneaten food, nesting material, and their feces, and help to aerate the soil with their digging. They also serve as a food source for a variety of predators.

== Behavior ==
=== Social behavior ===
Alaska marmots are very social, living in colonies of up to 50 while all sharing a common burrow system. Marmots typically have their own personal den, while the young live with their mother and the father lives in a nearby den. Especially in large colonies, the Alaska marmots utilize sentry duty roles that are periodically rotated.

M. broweri will mark their territory by secreting a substance from face-glands and rubbing the sides of their face on rocks around their den and various trails. Alaska marmots also enjoy sunbathing and spending a large amount of time in personal grooming.

=== Hibernation ===
M. broweri is one of the longer hibernating marmots, being documented to do so up to eight months annually. Alaska marmots accumulate a thick fat layer by late summer to sustain them throughout the winter hibernation. Alaska marmots are active until snow begins to fall, when they will go to their hibernacula from around September until June. Alaska marmots have special winter dens with a single entrance that is plugged with a mixture of dirt, vegetation, and feces during the winter hibernation period. These winter dens are built on exposed ridges that thaw earlier than other areas, and the entire colony stays within the den from September until the plug melts in early May. They then settle in their dens in family units to communally hibernate for the winter.

Communal hibernation may be an adapted strategy to reduce metabolic cost while trying to keep their body temperatures above freezing. During hibernation many of their body functions decrease such as body temperature (averages between 4.5 °C (40.1 °F) and 7.5 °C (45.5 °F)), heart rates, and respiratory rates. Alaska marmot hibernation is not continuous because they will awaken every three or four weeks in order to urinate and defecate. Inside the hibernaculum den, the Alaska marmot has shown long-term hibernation adaptions by their ability to tolerate high CO_{2} levels and low O_{2} levels. As an adaption to the Arctic environment and permanently frozen ground, Alaska marmots breed prior to emerging from the winter den. The Alaska marmots will generally emerge from the den during the first two weeks of May.

=== Reproduction ===
Male Alaska marmots are polygynous, mating with the monogamous females living on their territory. They are seasonal iteroparous and viviparous breeders that mate once in the early spring and give birth about six weeks later with litter sizes ranging from three to eight and an average litter size of four to five. The male and female Alaska marmots are involved in both raising and protecting the pups in their natal burrow. In both sexes sexual reproductive behaviors are stimulated by odors released from anal scent glands. Before birthing, the female will first close her den off and then she will give birth alone. The gestation period is about five or six weeks. Newly born Alaskan marmots are altricial; hairless, toothless, blind and are quite vulnerable to predators. After about six weeks young marmots have thick, soft fur and they begin to temporarily leave the den. They will go through three coats in their first year until their final one, which resembles adult Alaska marmots. They will hibernate and live with their parents at least one year, they will be fully-grown after two years and reach sexual maturity from two to three years. Marmots life span are not known but it is believed to be about thirteen to fifteen years.

== Conservation status ==
The status of Alaska marmots is not well known due to the difficulties in finding them in their natural habitat. IUCN has ranked the Alaska marmot as least concern, signifying relatively low concern in terms of the dangers they face. Although Alaska marmots may be hunted, their population is stable and not at risk for endangerment. The Alaska marmot has been declared the least threatened species of marmot.

=== Dangers ===
Although dangers of direct human disturbance are minimal, climate dangers pose a significant threat. The Alaska marmot is arguably the most sensitive of the 14 marmot species to anthropogenic disturbances, including climate change.

=== Captive rearing ===
M. broweri has been reported to have been successfully reared in captivity and reintroduced into the wild, but there have been cases where captive rearing led to high rates of mortality.

== Relationship with humans ==
Marmota broweri are sometimes hunted by Alaskan Natives for food and their warm fur. The fur is fairly valuable, worth about US$6 to US$8 in 1956 (equivalent to about $71.05 to $94.74 in 2025).

Marmot Day is a relatively new Alaskan holiday with parallels to Groundhog Day. Sarah Palin signed a bill in 2009 to officially make every February 2 Marmot Day. The bill, introduced by Senator Linda Menard, said, "It made sense for the marmot to become Alaska's version of Punxsutawney Phil, the Pennsylvania groundhog famed for his winter weather forecasts." She did not expect marmots to have any weather-forecasting duties but rather hoped that the state would create educational activities regarding the marmot.
