= Utukok River =

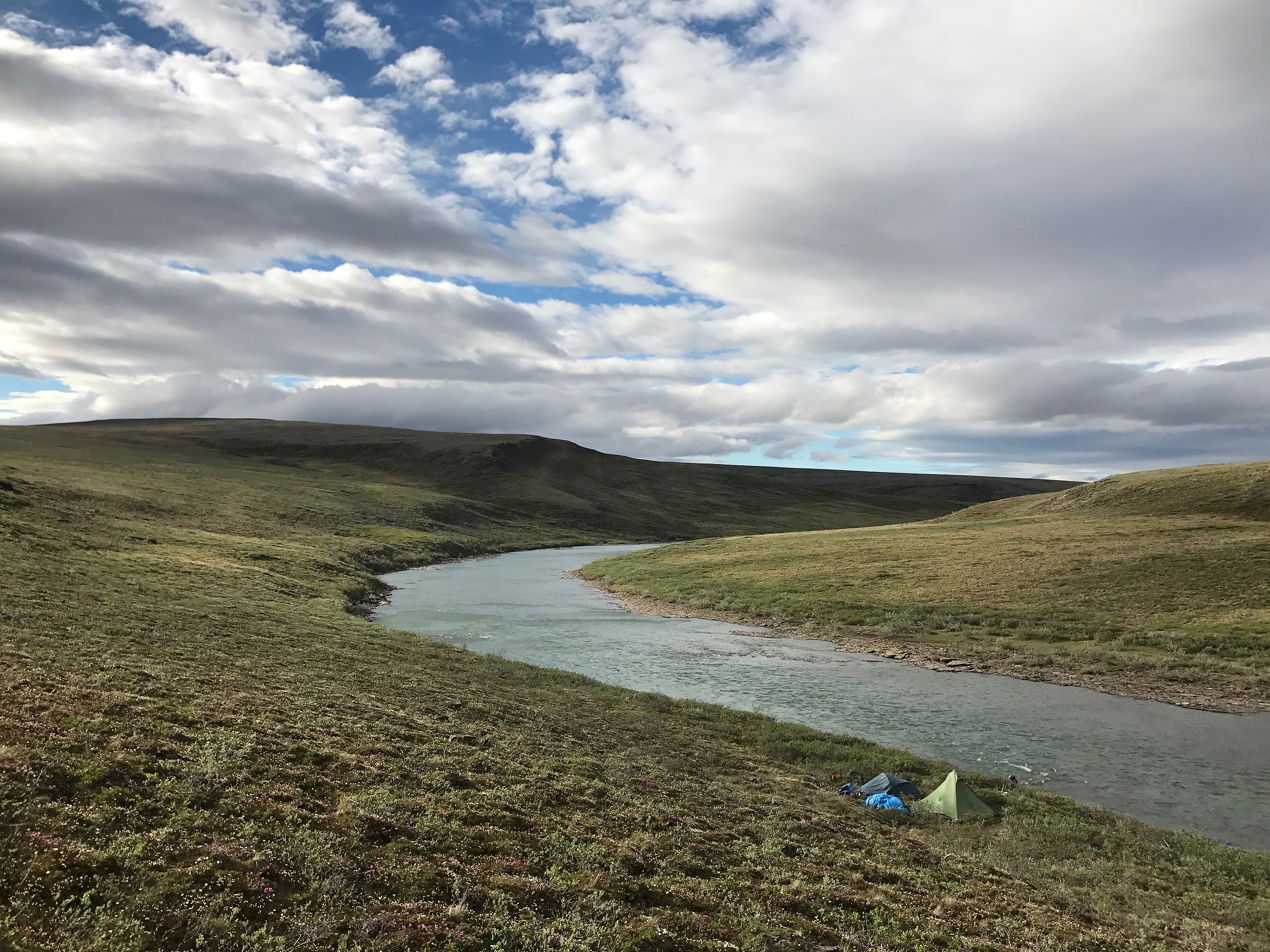

- Location of the mouth of the Utukok River in Alaska
- Native name: Utuqqaq (Inupiaq)

Location
- Country: United States
- State: Alaska
- Borough: North Slope

Physical characteristics
- Source: Confluence of Kogruk and Tupik creeks
  - location: De Long Mountains, Brooks Range, National Petroleum Reserve–Alaska
  - coordinates: 68°33′26″N 161°06′20″W
  - elevation: 2,075 ft (632 m)
- Mouth: Kasegaluk Lagoon, Chukchi Sea, Arctic Ocean
  - location: 20 miles (32 km) southwest of Icy Cape
  - coordinates: 70°02′49″N 162°27′26″W
  - elevation: 0 ft (0 m)
- Length: 225 mi (362 km)

The Utukok River (Iñupiaq: Utuqqaq) is a 225-mile (362 km) long stream in the North Slope Borough of the U.S. state of Alaska. It rises in the De Long Mountains at the confluence of Kogruk and Tupik creeks and flows north, northeast, and then northwest. It empties into Kasegaluk Lagoon on the Chukchi Sea of the Arctic Ocean, 20 miles (32 km) southwest of Icy Cape. It is the breeding ground for Arctic caribou and various birds.

Utuqqaq, meaning old or ancient, is the Inuit name for Icy Cape. Variant names used for the river in the 19th century included "Utukak" and "Ootokok".

== See also ==
- List of rivers of Alaska
- Seismo Creek
