= Kukpowruk River =

- Location of the mouth of the Kukpowruk River in Alaska

Location
- Country: United States
- State: Alaska
- Borough: North Slope

Physical characteristics
- Source: De Long Mountains
  - coordinates: 68°26′20″N 162°29′49″W
  - elevation: 2,872 ft (875 m)
- Mouth: Kasegaluk Lagoon, Chukchi Sea, Arctic Ocean
  - location: 9 miles (14 km) south of Point Lay
  - coordinates: 69°36′57″N 163°01′06″W
  - elevation: 0 ft (0 m)
- Length: 160 mi (260 km)

The Kukpowruk River is a stream, 160 miles (260 km) long, in the western North Slope Borough of the U.S. state of Alaska. It arises in the De Long Mountains of the western Brooks Range and flows north into Kasegaluk Lagoon of the Chukchi Sea, Arctic Ocean. The river mouth is about 9 miles (14 km) south of Point Lay. Arctic Slope Regional Corporation is the major landowner along the river.

The Inuit name for the river probably means "fairly large stream" or "a stream." A late 19th-century variant was "Kook Pow ruk."

== See also ==
- List of rivers of Alaska
