= Point Lay LRRS Airport =

- IATA: PIZ; ICAO: PPIZ; FAA LID: PIZ

Summary
- Airport type: Public / military
- Owner: U.S. Government 11 TCW/LGO Elmendorf
- Location: Point Lay, Alaska
- Elevation AMSL: 25 ft (7.6 m)
- Coordinates: 69°43′56″N 163°00′40″W

Map
- Location of Point Lay LRRS Airport

Runways
Direction	Length		Surface
Direction	ft	m	Surface
5/23	3,519	1,073	Gravel

Statistics (2005)
- Aircraft operations: 120
- Source: Federal Aviation Administration

Point Lay LRRS Airport (IATA: PIZ, ICAO: PPIZ, FAA LID: PIZ) is a public and military use airport owned by the United States Government and located in Point Lay, in the North Slope Borough of the U.S. state of Alaska. It is also known as Point Lay Airport. The acronym LRRS stands for Long Range Radar Site or Long Range Radar Station.

== Facilities and aircraft ==
Point Lay LRRS Airport has one runway designated 5/23 with a gravel surface measuring 3,519 by 80 feet (1,073 x 24 m).

For the 12-month period ending December 31, 2005, the airport had 120 aircraft operations, an average of 10 per month: 42% air taxi, 42% military and 16% general aviation.

== Airlines and destinations ==
Airlines	Destinations
Wright Air Service	Utqiagvik

Note that Utqiagvik, Alaska used to be called Barrow, Alaska

=== Top destinations ===
Busiest domestic routes out of PIZ (June 2010 - May 2011)
Rank	City	Passengers	Carriers
1	(Alaska) Utqiagvik, AK	1,000	Hageland

== History ==
The airport was built in 1957 to support the Distant Early Warning Line Radar station at Point Lay (LIZ-2). The station was logistically supported by the 711th Aircraft Control and Warning Squadron based at Cape Lisburne Air Force Station, although Point Lay was operated by civilian contract workers.

The radar station was upgraded in the late 1980s with new radars and in 1989 was re-designated part of the North Warning System (NWS) as a Long Range Radar Site, A-15, controlled by the Pacific Air Forces 611th Air Support Group, based at Elmendorf AFB.

The LRR site was inactivated in 1989 due to soil erosion and budget concerns. After its closure, the radar was removed in August 1998 and other military buildings were removed around 2000, returning the site to a natural condition. The airport remains open to support the small settlement at Point Lay.

== See also ==
- Alaskan Air Command
- Distant Early Warning Line
- Eleventh Air Force
- List of airports in Alaska
- North Warning System
