= Deadfall =

Deadfall may refer to:

- Deadfall trap, a kind of trap for large animals, consisting of a heavy board or log that falls onto the prey
- Deadfall (1968 film), starring Michael Caine, Eric Portman, and Giovanna Ralli
- Deadfall, a BBC radio play (1987) by R.D. Wingfield
- Deadfall (1993 film), featuring Nicolas Cage, Charlie Sheen, James Coburn, and Peter Fonda
- Deadfall (2012 film), a 2012 film starring Eric Bana, Olivia Wilde, and Charlie Hunnam
- Deadfall (novel), a 1997 novel in the Virgin New Adventures series of Doctor Who
- Deadfall (band), a British thrash metal band from Nottingham
- Deadfall Creek, a river in Alaska
- Deadfall Adventures, a video game by The Farm 51
- Dead to Fall, a metal-core band
- A fallen tree, such as a nurse log

== See also ==
- A Dying Fall (2012), Elly Griffiths' fifth Ruth Galloway novel
- The Prison Break episode, Dead Fall
- Döda Fallet, a dry waterfall near Ragunda in Sweden
