= Elusive Creek =

Stream in North Slope Borough, Alaska, U.S.

Coordinates: 69°26′30″N 160°04′30″W

Elusive Creek is a stream in North Slope Borough, Alaska, in the United States. It is a tributary of the Utukok River.

Elusive Creek was so named in the 1920s for the "deceptive appearance of the valley and the difficulty of determining its junction with the Utukok River".

== See also ==
- List of rivers of Alaska
