= Iligluruk Creek =

Stream in North Slope Borough, Alaska, U.S.

Coordinates: 68°44′54″N 162°00′45″W

Iligluruk Creek is a stream in North Slope Borough, Alaska, in the United States. It is a tributary of Kokolik River.

Iligluruk is derived from an Eskimo word meaning "burnt looking".

== See also ==
- List of rivers of Alaska
