= Meaty =

Meaty may refer to:

- Meaty taste (also known as umami or savoriness), one of the five basic tastes
- Meaty (book), an essay collection by Samantha Irby
- Mr. Meaty, a 2006 animated Nickelodeon TV series
- "Meaty" (Battle for Dream Island), a 2023 web series episode

== See also ==
- Meat
- Meat (disambiguation)
