= Seismo Creek =

Stream in North Slope Borough, Alaska, U.S.

Coordinates: 68°59′55″N 161°00′12″W

Seismo Creek is a stream in North Slope Borough, Alaska, in the United States. It heads near Meat Mountain and flows to the Utukok River.

Seismo Creek was named in 1950 for nearby seismic operations.

== See also ==
- List of rivers of Alaska
