= Tingmerkpuk River =

Stream in North Slope Borough, Alaska, U.S.

Coordinates: 68°47′15″N 162°04′57″W

Tingmerkpuk River is a stream in North Slope Borough, Alaska, in the United States. It is a tributary of the Kokolik River.

Tingmerkpuk is derived from an Eskimo word meaning "eagle".

== See also ==
- List of rivers of Alaska
