= Avingak Creek =

Stream in North Slope Borough, Alaska, U.S

- Location of the mouth of Avingak Creek in Alaska

Location
- Country: United States
- State: Alaska
- Borough: North Slope

Physical characteristics
- Source
  - location: North Slope Borough, Alaska
  - coordinates: 69.44°N 160.46°W
  - elevation: 1,022 ft (312 m)
- Mouth
  - location: Kokolik River
  - coordinates: 69.4164°N 161.3589°W
  - elevation: 279 ft (85 m)
- Length: 28 mi (45 km)

Avingak Creek is a stream in North Slope Borough, Alaska, in the United States of America. It is a right-bank tributary of the Kokolik River. Avingak is derived from the Eskimo word meaning "lemming", and the abundance of lemmings at the creek caused its name to be selected.

== See also ==
- List of rivers of Alaska
