= Icy Cape Air Force Station =

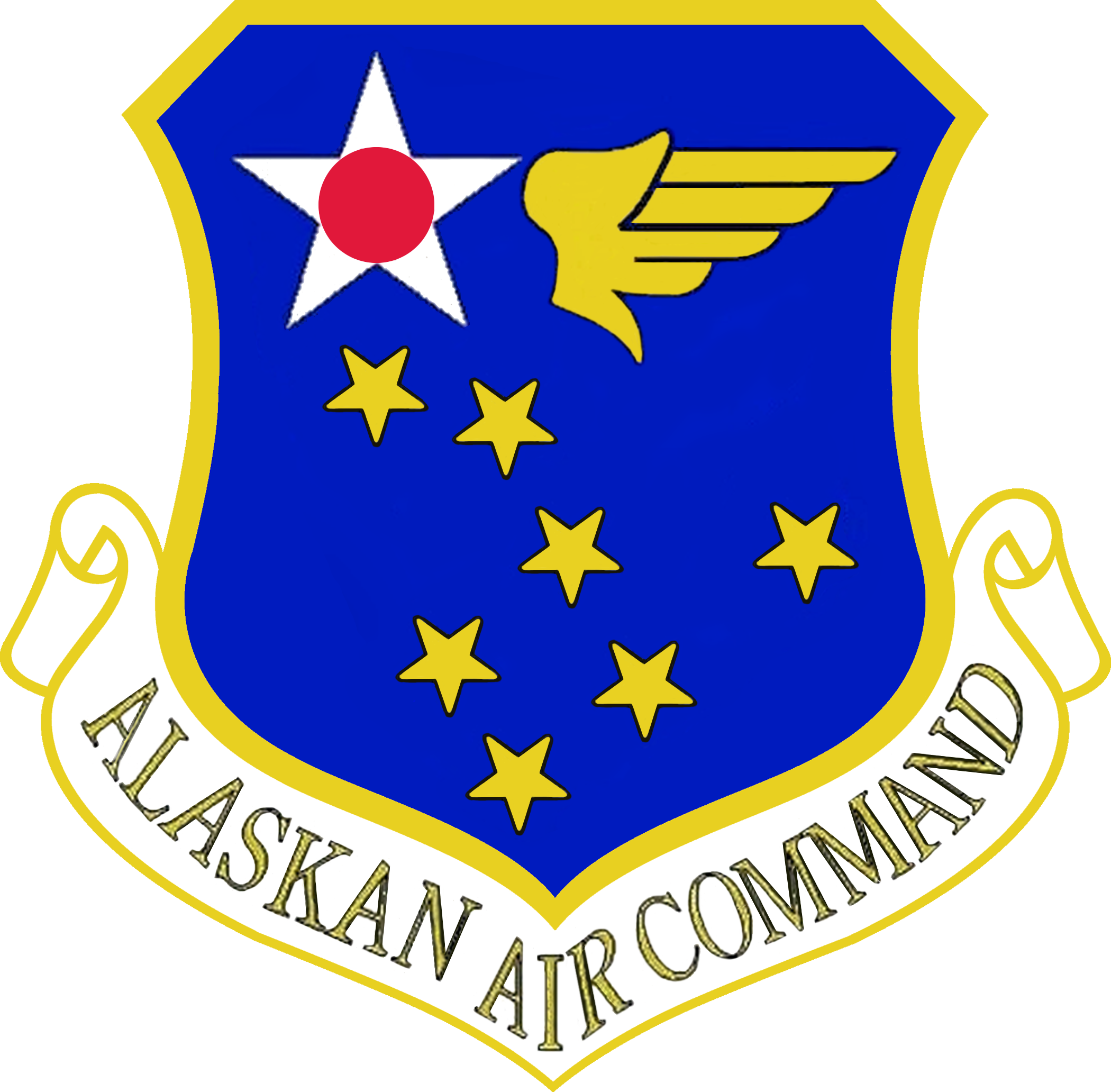
Icy Cape Air Force Station
- Part of Alaskan Air Command (AAC)

Site information
- Type: Air Force Station
- Controlled by: United States Air Force

Location
- Location of Icy Cape Air Force Station, Alaska
- Coordinates: 70°17′23″N 161°54′40″W

Site history
- Built: 1957
- In use: 1957-1963

Icy Cape Air Force Station is an abandoned United States Air Force Distant Early Warning Line Radar station at Icy Cape on the Chukchi Sea coast of northwestern Alaska, United States. It was closed in 1963.

== History ==
The Station was built in 1957 to support the Distant Early Warning Line as Icy Cape (LIZ-B). The station was logistically supported by the 711th Aircraft Control and Warning Squadron based at Cape Lisburne Air Force Station, although Icy Cape was operated by civilian contract workers.

It was closed in 1963 and has been abandoned ever since. The radars and other military buildings were removed around 2000, returning the site to a natural condition. The gravel streets and the runway of the former airstrip of the station remain.
