= Meat (disambiguation) =

Meat is animal flesh that is eaten as food.

Meat may also refer to:

== Places ==
- Meat Mountain, a mountain in Alaska

== People ==
- Meat Katie, a London-based tech-funk producer and DJ
- Meat Loaf (1947–2022), an American musician and actor
- Shawn Stasiak (born 1970), a former professional wrestler known by the ring name "Meat"

== Art, entertainment, and media ==
=== Fictional characters ===
- Meat (Mortal Kombat), a playable character in the Mortal Kombat video game series
- Meat (We Will Rock You), a fictional character from the musical We Will Rock You
- Meat Alexandria, a fictional character from the manga/anime Kinnikuman
- Big Meat, a character in the crime film Waist Deep (2006)

=== Film and television ===
- Meat (1976 film), a 1976 documentary film directed by Frederick Wiseman
- Meat (film), a 2010 Dutch drama-thriller film
- "Meat" (Mandy), a 2020 television episode
- "Meat" (Torchwood), a 2008 television episode
- Carne (English: Meat), a 1968 Argentine film

=== Music ===
- Meat (album), a 2010 album by Hawksley Workman
- Meat (EP), a 2015 EP by Idles
- "M.E.A.T.", a 2014 song by Tomahawk

== Sports ==
- Meat, baseball jargon for a rookie or an easy out; see glossary of baseball

== Business ==
- "MEAT", referring to the most economically advantageous tender used in appointing a supplier in business

== Food ==
- The edible flesh of a fruit or nut, by analogy
