= Kasegaluk Lagoon =

Lagoon in the state of Alaska, United States

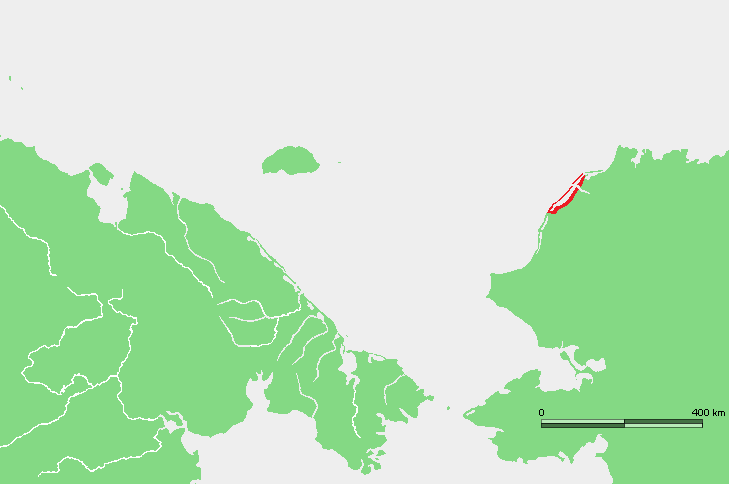
Location of the Kasegaluk Lagoon.

The Kasegaluk Lagoon (Iñupiaq: Qasigialik) is a coastal lagoon located in the western part of the North Slope of Alaska. It is separated from the Chukchi Sea by a series of long, thin barrier islands that stretch south and north-east from the town of Point Lay and westwards down to Icy Cape. There are seven passes through these islands. The lagoon receives the waters from the Kukpowruk, Kokolik, and Utukok Rivers.

Kasegaluk Lagoon extends for about 200 km (120 mi), from approximately 69°16′N 163°15′W to 70°22′N 160°47′W.

The lagoon's Inuit name was formerly reported as "Kasegarlik" but it was changed in 1929 to its present spelling. In 1965, at Wainwright, the lagoon's name was recorded as "Kasegelik," meaning "spotted seal place" or "having spotted seal."

== See also ==
- Epizetka River
- List of islands of Alaska
