= Deadfall Creek =

Stream in Alaska, United States

Coordinates: 69°14′15″N 162°41′00″W

Deadfall Creek is a stream in North Slope Borough, Alaska, in the United States. It is a tributary of the Kukpowruk River

Deadfall Creek was named for a stone deadfall trap set by Eskimos near its mouth.

== See also ==
- List of rivers of Alaska
