= Cape Lisburne Air Force Station =

US Air Force General Surveillance Radar station in Alaska

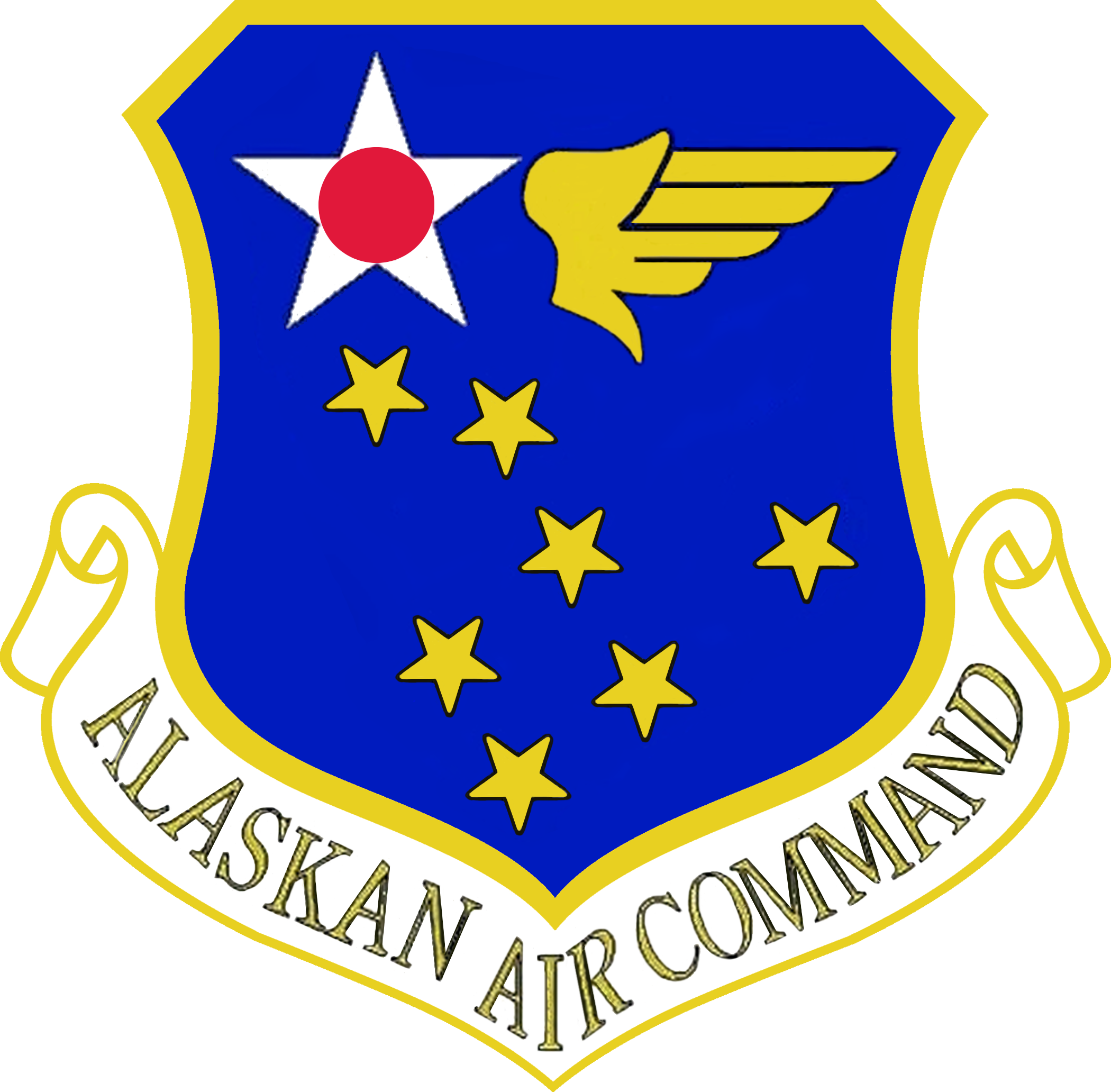
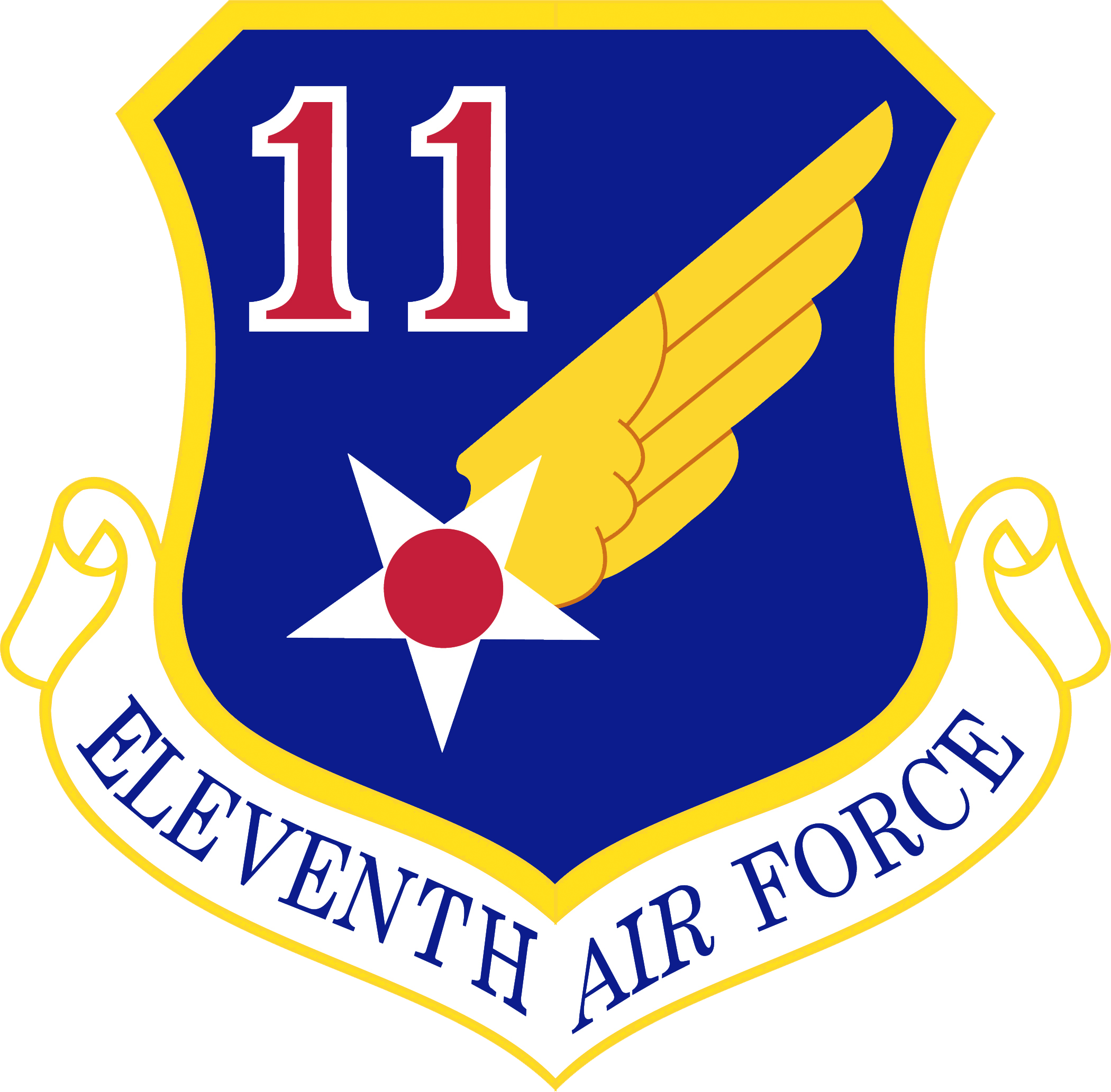
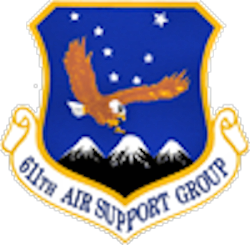
Cape Lisburne Air Force Station Cape Lisburne Long Range Radar Site
- Part of Eleventh Air Force (PACAF)

Site information
- Type: Air Force Station
- Controlled by: United States Air Force

Location
- Location of Cape Lisburne AFS, Alaska
- Coordinates: 68°52′12″N 166°09′00″W

Site history
- Built: 1953
- In use: 1953-Present

Garrison information
- Garrison: 711th Aircraft Control and Warning Squadron (1953–1983)

Cape Lisburne Air Force Station (AAC ID: F-07, LRR ID: A-19, DEW ID: LIZ-1) is a closed United States Air Force General Surveillance Radar station. It is located 276.5 miles (445.0 km) west-southwest of Point Barrow, Alaska.

The radar surveillance station was closed on 1 November 1983, and was re-designated as a Long Range Radar (LRR) site as part of the Alaska Radar System. Today, it remains active as part of the Alaska NORAD Region, under the jurisdiction of the 611th Air and Space Operations Center, Elmendorf AFB, Alaska.

== History ==
Cape Lisburne AFS was a continental defence radar station constructed to provide the United States Air Force early warning of an attack by the Soviet Union on Alaska. It was one of the ten original radar surveillance sites constructed during the early 1950s, to establish a permanent air defense system in Alaska.

An assignment to the station was one of the most remote tours which an Airman could serve during its operational lifetime.

The station was located at Cape Lisburne, a bleak, treeless location in the most northwestern point in Alaska between the Arctic Ocean and the Chuckchi Sea, some 570 miles northwest of Fairbanks. There are no permanent residents at the site, and Point Hope is the nearest community, 25 miles to the southwest. The site is accessible only by sea and air.

The first western explorer to arrive at Cape Lisburne was Captain James Cook in his search for a Northwest Passage from the Pacific to the Atlantic Ocean. He gave the location its name (Cape Lisbourne), the reason for the name being lost in the passage of time. A small Eskimo settlement, Wevok, existed for a short period of time in an area on the western side of what would become the Air Force Station. Wevok was a stopover point for Eskimos from Point Hope who followed the winter trail to Point Barrow in search of polar bears. A missionary lived with the Eskimos at Wevok in the late 19th, early 20th century. He, along with several natives, are buried in a small cemetery on the western side of the Air Force station. Wevok was abandoned early in the 20th century, and other than the cemetery there is nothing which remains of it.

In the late 1940s with the outbreak of the Cold War, the United States Air Force decided to expand the aircraft control and warning system in the Alaska Territory. This expansion involved the establishment of several new radar surveillance stations, one of which was Cape Lisburne.

The first Airmen to arrive at the station was Detachment F-7, 142d Aircraft Control and Warning Squadron (AC&W Sq) on 21 June 1951, during the site construction period. The unit consisted of two officers and 29 enlisted men. Their mission was to provide site security and establish a temporary work camp, consisting of tents. 550 tons of cargo arrived by ship along with the airmen. High winds, rain, and heavy seas made the operation hazardous to all involved. During the first year, supplies and food were airdropped to the workers and airmen, many times it drifted into the ocean and was lost. During the first winter, the detachment was reduced to one officer and 14 Airmen. The Army Transportation Corps undertook the construction project, code name Mona Lisa, of getting the initial supplies and equipment to the construction site. The only means of getting construction materials and supplies to the site was by barge or Navy LSTs; however, this was restricted to when the sea was not frozen. The ground support station was located on the northern coast of the peninsula, 68°52′19″N 166°05′11″W. A 4,800' airstrip was constructed in 1951 adjacent to the ground support station, with a gravel runway capable of medium transport (C-118, C-130) 68°52′30″N 166°06′36″W landings and takeoffs.

The station (bottom camp) consisted of a power/heating plant, water and fuel storage tanks, gymnasium and other support office buildings. Two other buildings contained living quarters, work areas, and recreational facilities plus opportunities for such sports as skiing, skating, horseshoes, and basketball. The buildings were connected by enclosed portals so no one needed to go outside in winter unless absolutely necessary. Tours at the station were limited to one year because of the psychological strain and physical hardships. Mail was usually delivered twice a week. The inaccessibility made the personnel at the site responsible for maintenance if anything went wrong. Water mains occasionally froze and ruptured.

Given the close proximity of the new base to Siberia, an air attack was a serious concern during the early years of the Cold War. An M51 trailer-mounted M-55 .50 Multiple quad machine gun was installed at the station for defense. Capable of firing at a rate of 450 to 575 rounds per minute per gun, this weapon was particularly lethal when applied to ground targets in the field.

Initially, there were no roads, which had to be built as part of the construction effort to reach the top camp. The radar site (top camp) was sited on the summit of a 1,600 foot mountain located 2 miles south-southeast of bottom camp. It was reached via an access road built along the side of a mountain, about 4 miles in length. Radars were installed at the top camp in October 1952. Radars at top camp included an AN/FPS-3, AN/FPS-20A and an AN/FPS-93A.

On 8 December 1952, the 711th AC&W Squadron was activated to replace the National Guardsmen and the station went operational. As a surveillance station, Cape Lisburne provided information 24/7 to the Air Defense Direction Center at Murphy Dome AFS near Fairbanks, where it was analyzed to determine range, direction altitude speed and whether or not aircraft were friendly or hostile.

Communications were initially provided by a high frequency radio system which proved unreliable because of atmospheric disturbances. The Alaskan Air Command, after investigating various options, decided to build the White Alice Communications System, a system of Air Force-owned tropospheric scatter and microwave radio relay sites operated by the Air Force Communications Service (AFCS). The Cape Lisburne site 68°52′11″N 166°08′56″W was activated in 1957. It was inactivated in 1979, and replaced by an Alascom owned and operated satellite earth terminal as part of an Air Force plan to divest itself of the obsolete White Alice Communications System and transfer the responsibility to a commercial firm.

In 1955 Cape Lisburne became part of the Distant Early Warning Line (DEW Line), the most westernmost station on the line which stretched east across the northern part of Alaska, Canada and into Greenland. The station received an AN/FPS-19 pulse radar and was designated as station LIZ-1. It remained a staffed station on the line until DEW Operationc ceased in 1983 when the station became an AN/FPS-117 Minimally Attended Radar station and is now part of the NORAD North Warning System (NWS).

Over the years, the equipment at the station was upgraded or modified to improve the efficiency and accuracy of the information gathered by the radars. In 1983, Cape Lisburne AFS received a new AN/FPS-117 minimally attended radar under Alaskan Air Command's SEEK IGLOO program . It was designed to transmit aircraft tracking data via satellite to the Alaskan NORAD Regional Operations Control Center (ROCC) at Elmendorf AFB.

No longer needed, the 711th AC&W Sq was inactivated on 1 November 1983 and the station redesignated as a Long Range Radar (LRR) Site. In 1990, jurisdiction of the Indian Mountain LRR Site was transferred to Pacific Air Forces (PACAF)'s Eleventh Air Force with the redesignation of AAC.

In 1998 PACAF initiated "Operation Clean Sweep", in which abandoned Cold War stations in Alaska were remediated and the land restored to its previous state. After years of neglect the facilities at the station had lost any value they had when the site was closed. The site remediation of the radar, support and White Alice communication station was carried out by the 611th Civil Engineering Squadron at Elmendorf AFB, and remediation work was completed by 2005. Today very little of the former Cape Lisburne Air Force Station remains.

== Demographics ==
Historical population
Census	Pop.	Note	%±
1970	83		—
1980	36		−56.6%
U.S. Decennial Census

Cape Lisburne (Station) was listed on the 1970 and 1980 U.S. Censuses. It was made a census-designated place (CDP) in 1980. With the closure of the station in 1983, it ceased to appear on the census.

== Distant Early Warning Line support ==
Beginning in July 1957, Cape Lisburne AFS controlled a sector of the Distant Early Warning Line. The LIZ sector was the most westernmost point of the network, composed of a series of surveillance radar stations along the northwest Alaska Coast to Icy Cape (LIZ-B), about 140 miles to the northeast.

Cape Lisburne controlled five staffed stations, two of them being classified as "Auxiliary" sites and three "Intermediate" stations. The Auxiliary stations were similar to the main site at Cape Lisburne; the Intermediate sites having less personnel at them. The stations were made up of an AN/FPS-19 search radar, a high power L-Band radar consisting of two identical radar sets feeding a dual (back to back) antenna with a range of about 160 nautical miles. The sites had one 25-man module building for personnel who supported the radar, and an airstrip, although the length and capacity varied greatly, making frequent risky landings necessary at some sites.

Each of the sites were staffed by civilian contract workers who had signed 18-month contracts, although they were visited by Air Force military personnel from Cape Lisburne frequently.

DEW ID	LRRS ID	Site Name	Location	Activated	Inactivated	Notes
LIZ-2	A-15	Point Lay LRRS	69°43′56″N 163°00′34″W	1957	1994	DEW Auxiliary site, operations ended 1989; Became part of the North Warning System (NWS) in 1990 with AN/FPS-124 SRR, now inactivated.
LIZ-3	A-16	Wainwright SRRS	70°36′37″N 159°52′12″W	1953	2007	DEW Auxiliary site, operations ended 1995; Became part of the North Warning System (NWS) in 1995 with AN/FPS-124 SRR, now inactivated
LIZ-A		Cape Sabine	69°01′27″N 163°51′25″W	1957	1963	DEW Intermediate Site
LIZ-B		Icy Cape	70°17′23″N 161°54′40″W	1957	1963	DEW Intermediate Site
LIZ-C		Peard Bay	70°48′29″N 158°15′32″W	1957	1963	DEW Intermediate Site

With the signing of North American Air Defence Modernization agreement at the "Shamrock Summit" between Prime Minister Mulroney and President Reagan in Quebec City on 18 March 1985, the DEW Line began its eventual upgrading and transition becoming the North Warning System (NWS) of today. The intermediate sites were closed in 1963 due to the advancements in radar technology. Point Lay was closed in 1994 and Wainright in 2007 due to soil erosion & budget concerns. The closed sites were remediated by the Air Force around 1998, removing all abandoned military structures and returning the site to a natural condition.

== Current status ==
Today the site is controlled by the PACAF's 611th Air and Space Operations Center, based at Elmendorf AFB. The site is generally unattended; a few civilian contractors access the site by former support airstrip, now the Cape Lisburne LRRS Airport (ICAO: PALU, TC LID: LUR) and provide maintenance and support when needed to maintain the radar system.

- Site is currently staffed by contractors to maintain the runway, operate the power station and perform basic maintenance to the radar, buildings and supporting infrastructure.

== Air Force units and assignments ==
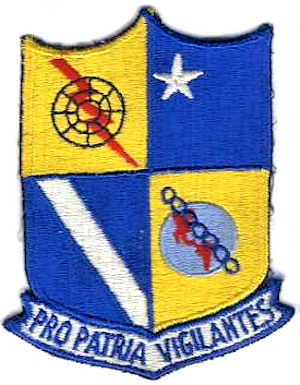
Emblem of the 711th Aircraft Control and Warning Squadron

=== Units ===
- 711th Aircraft Control and Warning Squadron

Activated on 8 December 1953
Inactivated on 1 November 1983

=== Assignments ===
- 160th Aircraft Control and Warning Group, 8 December 1952
- 548th Aircraft Control and Warning Group, 5 February 1953
- 11th Air Division, 18 April 1953
- 5001st Air Defense Group 20 September 1954
- 10th Air Division, 1 October 1955
- 5060th Aircraft Control and Warning Group, 1 November 1957
- 11th Air Division, ca. 1 July 1959
- 5070th Air Defense Wing, 1 August 1960
- Alaskan Air Command, 1 November 1961
- 531st Aircraft Control and Warning Group (later 11th Tactical Control Group, 11th Tactical Control Wing, 11th Air Control Wing, 611th Air Operations Group, 611th Air and Space Operations Center) 15 July 1977
