= Copter Peak =

Mountain in Alaska, United States

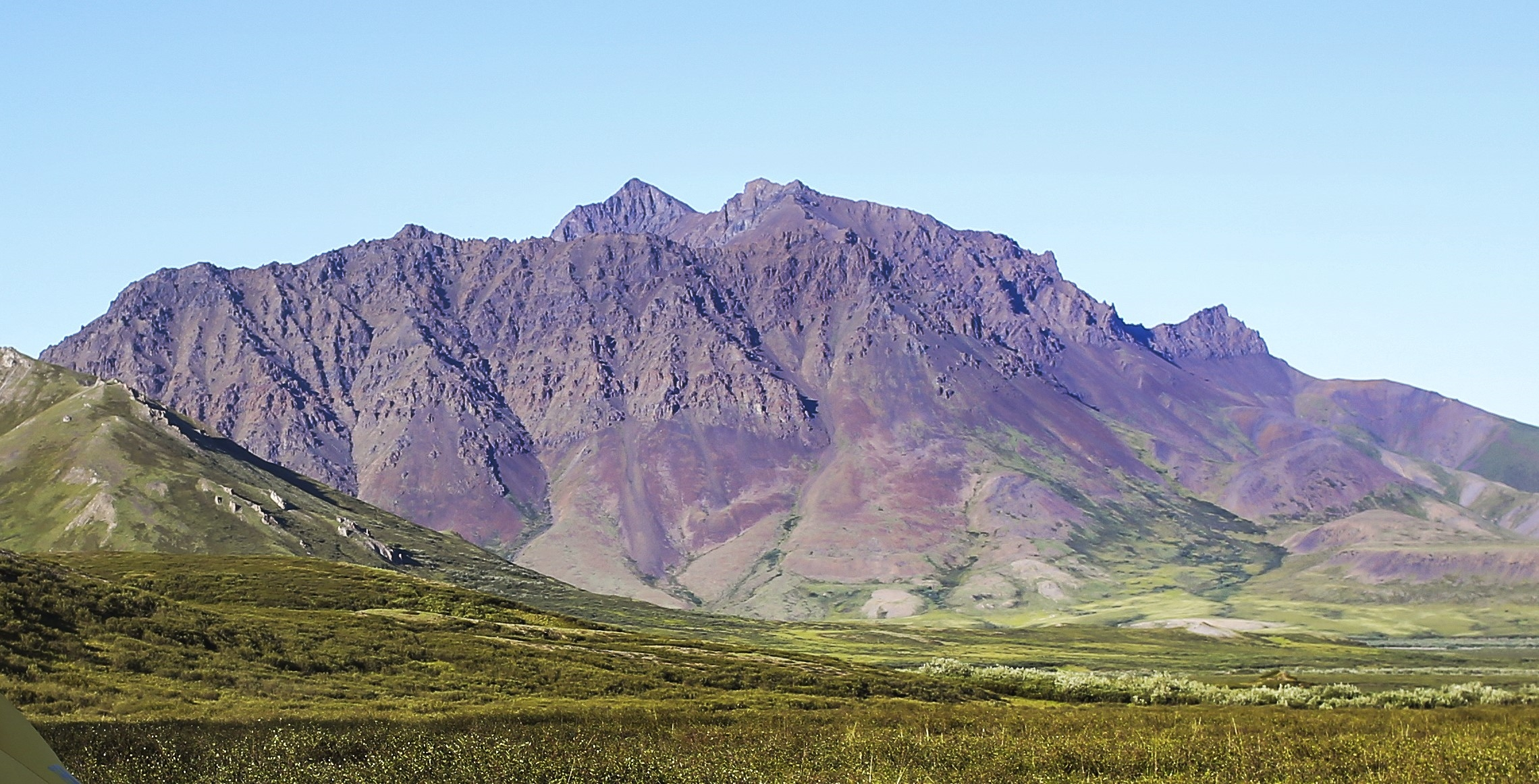
- Southwest aspect

Highest point
- Elevation: 4,250 ft (1,295 m)
- Prominence: 1,462 ft (446 m)
- Parent peak: Peak 4297
- Isolation: 2.48 mi (3.99 km)
- Coordinates: 68°29′44″N 161°18′41″W

Naming
- Etymology: Copter

Geography
- Location within Alaska
- Interactive map of Copter Peak
- Country: United States
- State: Alaska
- Borough: North Slope
- Protected area: Noatak National Preserve
- Parent range: De Long Mountains; Brooks Range
- Topo map: USGS Misheguk Mountain B-4

Geology
- Rock type: Igneous rock

Copter Peak is a 4,250-foot-elevation (1,295-meter) mountain summit in Alaska, United States.

== Description ==
Copter Peak is part of the De Long Mountains which are a subrange of the Brooks Range. It is set 115 miles (185 km) north of Kotzebue and 450 miles (720 km) northwest of Fairbanks in the Noatak National Preserve. Although remote, Copter Peak is a popular area to visit in Noatak National Preserve because of a nearby backcountry landing strip west of the peak. The mountain provides habitat for Dall sheep and the Alaska marmot. Precipitation runoff from the mountain drains into tributaries of the Kugururok River which in turn is a tributary of the Noatak River. Topographic relief is significant as the southeast slope rises approximately 2,450 feet (747 meters) in 0.9 miles (1.4 km). The mountain was so named by Donald J. Orth of the U.S. Geological Survey because of a difficult helicopter landing there in 1956. The mountain's toponym has been officially adopted by the United States Board on Geographic Names.

== Gallery ==
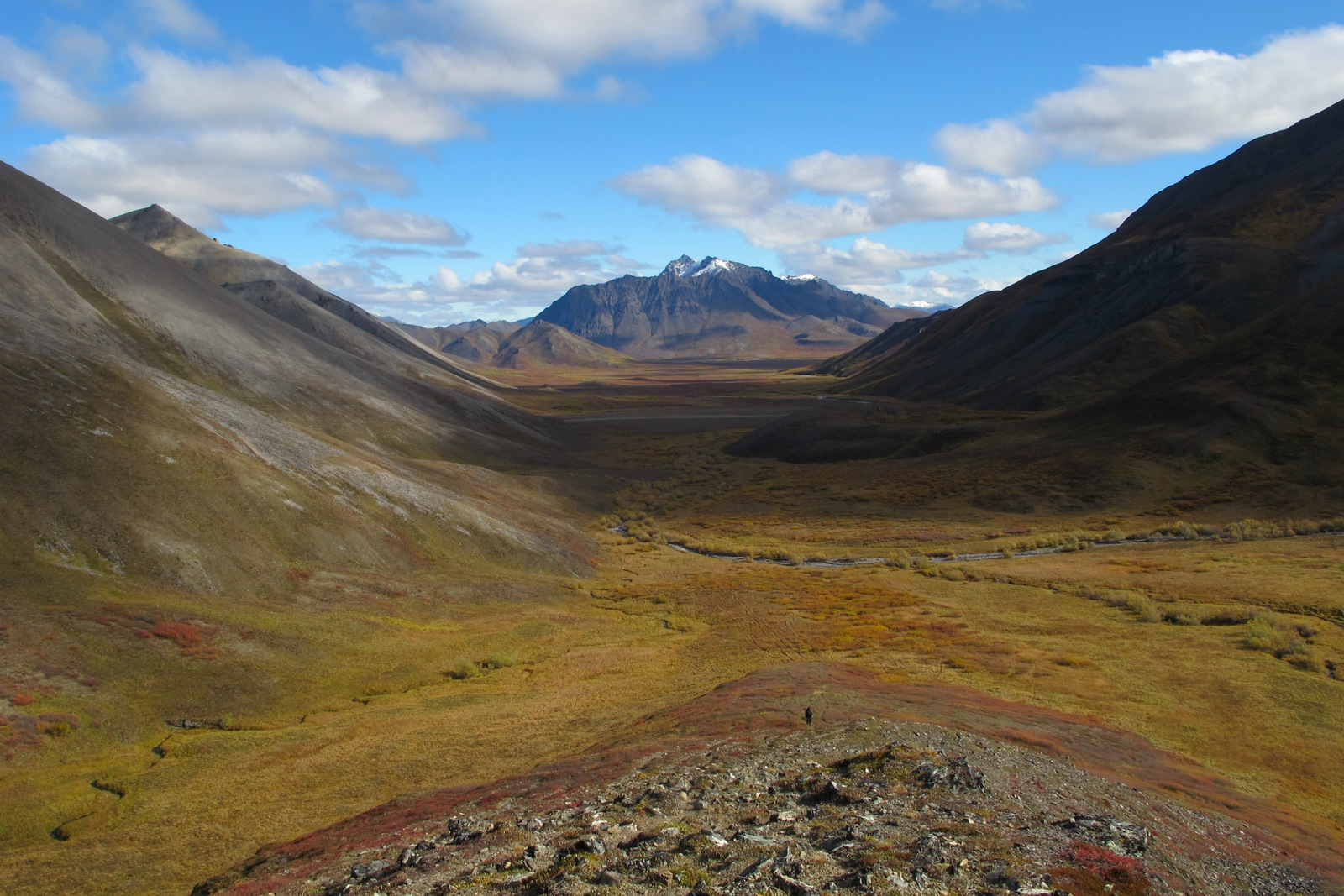
Copter Peak centered

== Climate ==
According to the Köppen climate classification system, Copter Peak is located in a subarctic climate zone with cold, snowy winters, and cool summers. Winter temperatures can drop below −20 °F with wind chill factors below −30 °F.

== See also ==
- List of mountain peaks of Alaska
