= Epizetka River =

Stream in North Slope Borough, Alaska, U.S.

Coordinates: 69°14′N 162°05′W

Epizetka River is a stream in North Slope Borough, Alaska, in the United States. It flows to Kasegaluk Lagoon.

The name is of Eskimo origin. It is also spelled Kipisatkak, Kipisatkuk and Epizotka, Epizetko, and Qipigsatqaq, from the Iñupiaq "it twists".

== See also ==
- List of rivers of Alaska
