= Cape Sabine (Alaska) =

Cape in Alaska, United States

Coordinates: 68°55′00″N 164°36′15″W

Cape Sabine is a cape at Chukchi Sea in North Slope Borough, Alaska, United States.

Cape Sabine was named in 1826, likely for Edward Sabine, an Irish explorer.

The Cape Sabine DEW Line Station was an airport located at the cape.
