= Cape Sabine DEW Line Station =

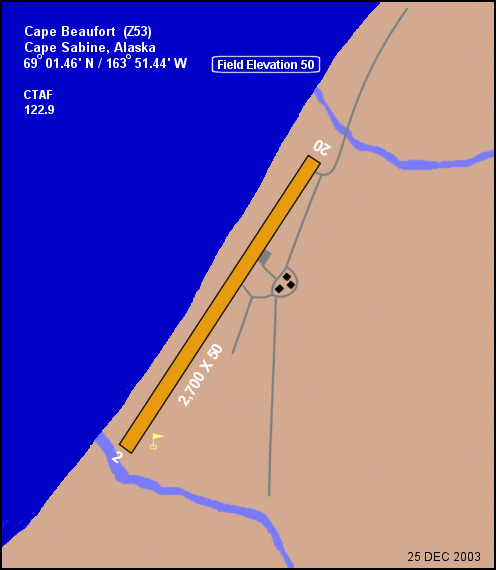
- IATA: none; ICAO: none; FAA LID: Z53

Summary
- Airport type: Public
- Owner: Cully Corporation
- Location: Cape Beaufort, Alaska
- Elevation AMSL: 50 ft (15 m)
- Coordinates: 69°01′28″N 163°51′26″W

Map
- Location of Cape Sabine DEW Line Station

Runways
Direction	Length		Surface
Direction	ft	m	Surface
2/20	2,700	823	Gravel
- Source: Federal Aviation Administration

Cape Sabine DEW Line Station (FAA LID: Z53) is a closed United States Air Force facility. It was formerly a Distant Early Warning Line Intermediate type radar station. It was closed in 1963 and has been abandoned ever since. Title to the property has been transferred from the Air Force to the Cully Corporation.

== Facilities ==
Cape Sabine Airport had one runway designated 2/20 with a 2,700 by 50 ft (823 x 15 m) gravel surface.

== History ==
The airport was built in 1957 to support the Distant Early Warning Line Radar station at Cape Sabine (LIZ-A). The station was logistically supported by the 711th Aircraft Control and Warning Squadron based at Cape Lisburne Air Force Station, although Cape Sabine was operated by civilian contract workers. It was closed in 1963 and has been abandoned ever since.

The radars and other military buildings were removed around 2000, returning the site to a natural condition.
