= Kokolik River =

- Location of the mouth of the Kokolik River in Alaska
- Native name: Qaqalik (Inupiaq)

Location
- Country: United States
- State: Alaska
- Borough: North Slope

Physical characteristics
- Source: De Long Mountains
  - coordinates: 68°30′21″N 162°09′45″W
  - elevation: 2,631 ft (802 m)
- Mouth: Kasegaluk Lagoon, Chukchi Sea, Arctic Ocean
  - location: 1 mile (1.6 km) east of Point Lay
  - coordinates: 69°46′15″N 162°59′48″W
  - elevation: 0 ft (0 m)
- Length: 200 mi (320 km)

Basin features
- Tributaries
  - right: Avingak Creek

The Kokolik River (Iñupiaq: Qaqalik) is a stream, 200 miles (320 km) long, in the western North Slope of the U.S. state of Alaska.

== Geography ==
The Kokolik River (Iñupiaq: Qaqalik) is a stream, 200 miles (320 km) long, in the western North Slope of the U.S. state of Alaska. It rises in the De Long Mountains of the western Brooks Range and flows generally north and northwest into the Kasegaluk Lagoon. The river mouth is 1 mile (1.6 km) east of Point Lay, on the Chukchi Sea of the Arctic Ocean.

Its Inuit name, Qaqalik, refers to the alpine bistort, an edible plant found in the region. A variant name, Kepizetka (qipigsatqaq), recorded on an Inuit map in the late 19th century, means "it twists" or "crooked".

== Geology ==
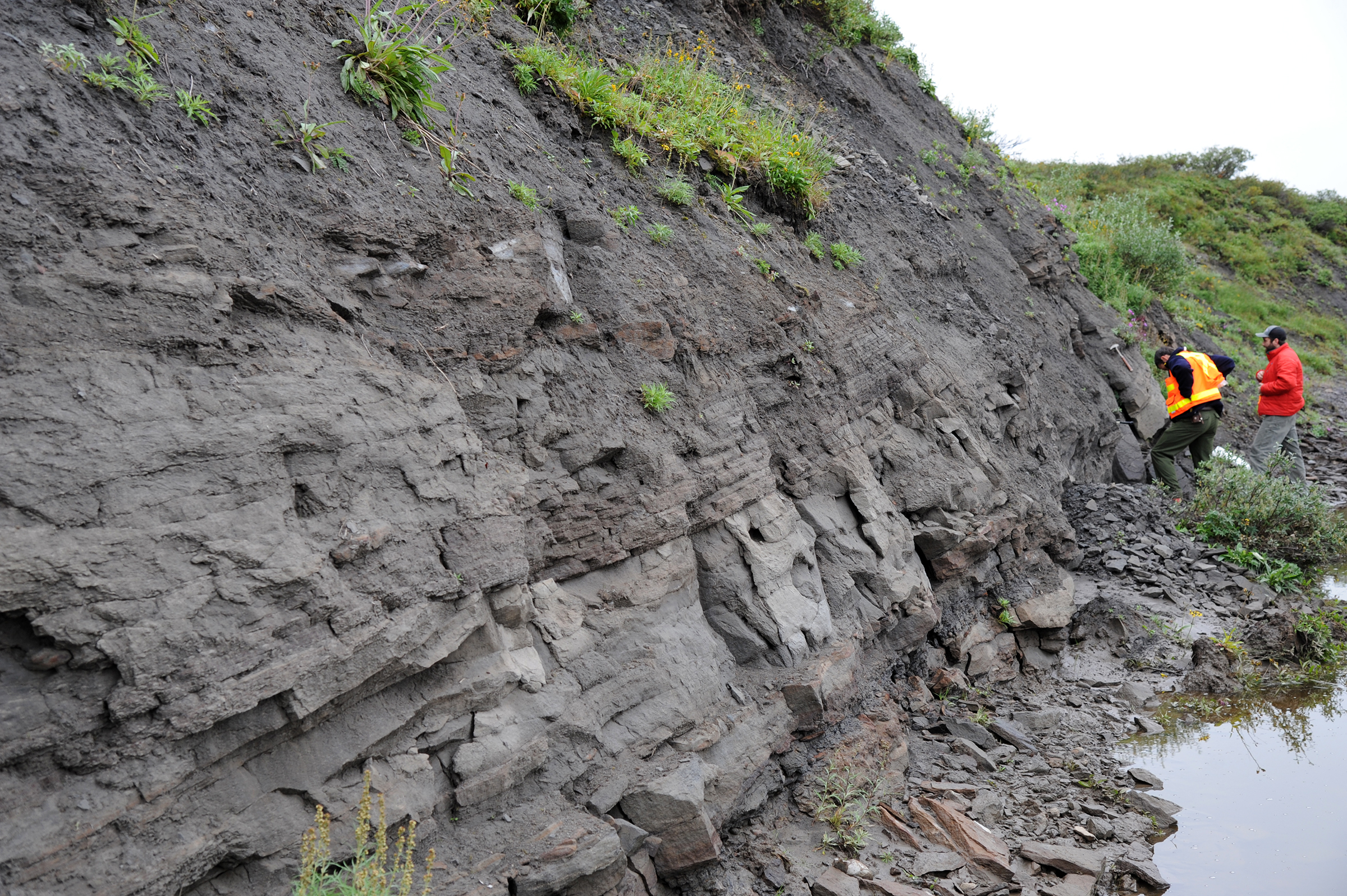
Kokolik River Oil Sand, 2013

The river passes through the Nanushuk Formation in the westernmost National Petroleum Reserve in Alaska (NPR-A). The sandstone contains oil, which is thought to have been generated beneath Western North Slope and migrated northeastward into NPR-A.

== History ==
In the summer of 1977, a tundra fire, apparently caused by lightning, affected 17 square miles (44 km^{2}) near the Kokolik River due east of Point Lay. Vegetation along the border of the National Petroleum Reserve burned during an exceptionally dry spell in the region. The site was the furthest north the Bureau of Land Management had ever fought a tundra fire.

== See also ==
- List of rivers of Alaska
