= Icy Cape =

Cape in Alaska, United States of America

- Cape
- Location within Alaska
- Coordinates: 70°19′47″N 161°52′27″W
- Location: North Slope Borough, Alaska, United States
- Water bodies: Chukchi Sea

Area
  - Total: Arctic

The Icy Cape is a headland on the Chukchi Sea side of the North Slope Borough, Alaska, United States. It was discovered and named by James Cook on August 17, 1778, on account of the ice along the coast.

Icy Cape is in an area of landspits, bounded by Kasegaluk Lagoon to the east and Sikolik Lake further inland.

Pink salmon and Arctic char are abundant in the waters near Icy Cape. Whales can also easily be sighted offshore in the Icy Cape area.

Icy Cape was formerly the site of the Icy Cape DEW Line Station, a United States Air Force Distant Early Warning Line Radar station.

== Demographics ==
Historical population
Census	Pop.	Note	%±
1880	50		—
1890	57		14.0%

Icy Cape appeared on the 1880 U.S. Census as the Inuit village of Otok-kok. It returned as Icy Cape in 1890.

== In popular culture ==
Icy Cape is the setting for "Ice", the eighth episode of the first season of the American television series The X-Files.
