= Meat Mountain =

Mountain in Alaska

Coordinates: 68°55′19″N 160°48′30″W

Meat Mountain (elevation 2,513 feet (766 m)) is a summit in North Slope Borough, Alaska, in the United States.

Meat Mountain is an English translation of the Eskimo name Nikipak.
