= De Long Mountains =

Mountain range in Alaska, United States

- A lone hiker in the Delong Mountains near the Nakolik landing strip.

Highest point
- Peak: Black Mountain
- Elevation: 5,020 ft (1,530 m)
- Coordinates: 68°33′35″N 160°19′41″W

Geography
- Location within Alaska
- Country: United States
- State: Alaska
- Range coordinates: 68°25′N 161°40′W

The De Long Mountains are a mountain range in the North Slope Borough of the U.S. state of Alaska. The range is located at the west end of the Brooks Range and extends west from Uivaksak Creek and the head of the Kuna River. They were named in 1886 after the Arctic explorer George Washington De Long (1844–1881).

The highest point is Black Mountain at 5,020 feet (1,530 m).

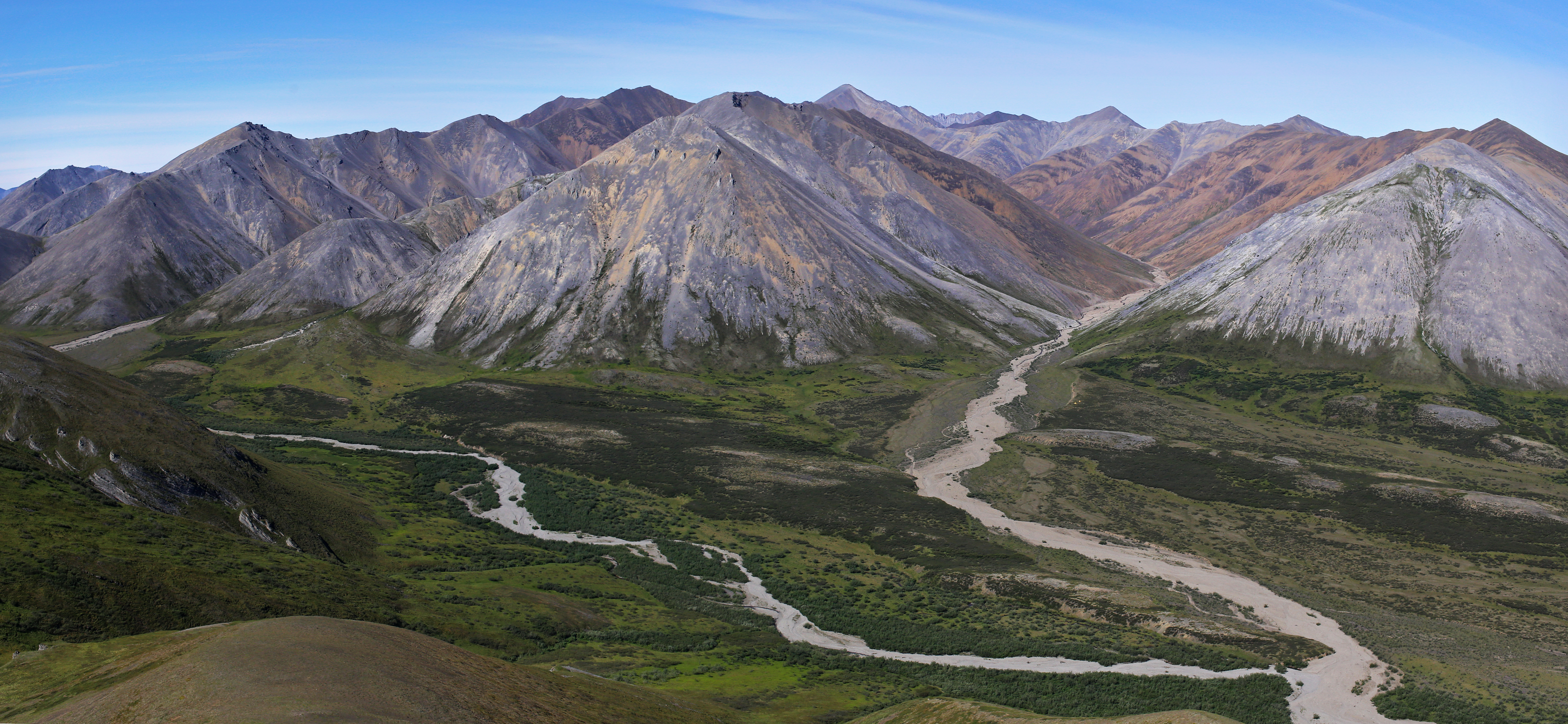
De Long Mountains west of Copter Peak
